= List of Foucault pendulums =

This is a list of Foucault pendulums in the world.

== Europe ==
Country	Facility	Location	String	Bob	Image	Notes/Citations
Austria	Pöllau Abbey	Pöllau 47°18′11″N 15°50′02″E 11.02 deg/hour 264.58 deg/day				Citations:
Austria	Sankt Ruprecht an der Raab	Sankt Ruprecht an der Raab 47°09′04″N 15°39′50″E 11 deg/hour 263.93 deg/day	6.5 m Period : 5.11 sec	Mass : 32.0 kg		Google Streetview; Citations:
Austria	Vienna Museum of Science and Technology	Vienna 48°11′28″N 16°19′05″E 11.18 deg/hour 268.33 deg/day	17.0 m Period : 8.27 sec	Mass : 50.0 kg		Foucault Pendulum, Technical Museum, Vienna, Austria on YouTube; Citations:
Belarus	Buinyts'ke field	Bujnicki, Mogilev region 53°51′41″N 30°15′21″E 12.11 deg/hour 290.73 deg/day				Маятник Фуко on YouTube; Citations:
Belarus	Maksim Tank Belarusian State Pedagogical University	Minsk 53°53′41″N 27°32′43″E 12.12 deg/hour 290.86 deg/day	7.5 m Period : 5.49 sec			Citations:
Belgium	Technopolis (Belgium)	Mechelen, Antwerp Province 51°00′07″N 4°28′12″E 11.66 deg/hour 279.78 deg/day				Citations:
Belgium	Foucault pendulum and fountain in Auderghem's	Auderghem 50°48′49″N 4°25′01″E 11.63 deg/hour 279.03 deg/day				Google Streetview; Citations:
Belgium	Temporary; Palace of Justice, Brussels	Brussels 50°50′12″N 4°21′06″E 11.63 deg/hour 279.13 deg/day				On 8 May 1951, the experiment was held to commemorate the 100th anniversary of Foucault's first pendulum experiment. Citations:
Belgium	Armand Pien Public Observatory	Ghent, East Flanders 51°02′44″N 3°43′28″E 11.66 deg/hour 279.95 deg/day				Citations:
Belgium	Mira Observatory	Flemish Brabant 50°56′05″N 4°22′09″E 11.65 deg/hour 279.51 deg/day				De Foucaultslinger op Mira on YouTube; Citations:
Belgium	Festraetsstudio	Sint-Truiden 50°49′18″N 5°11′35″E 11.63 deg/hour 279.07 deg/day				Citations:
Bulgaria	Clock Tower, Tryavna	Tryavna, Gabrovo Province 42°51′58″N 25°29′22″E 10.2 deg/hour 244.9 deg/day				Citations:
Bulgaria	Astronomical Observatory and Planetarium "Nicolaus Copernicus"	Varna, Varna Province 43°12′10″N 27°55′22″E 10.27 deg/hour 246.45 deg/day	17.6 m Period : 8.42 sec			Citations:
Czech Republic	Hradec Králové Observatory	Hradec Králové, Hradec Králové Region 50°10′38″N 15°50′20″E 11.52 deg/hour 276.49 deg/day	10.0 m Period : 6.34 sec			Citations:
Czech Republic	Flower Garden, Kroměříž	Kroměříž 49°17′49″N 17°22′51″E 11.37 deg/hour 272.92 deg/day	22.35 m Period : 9.48 sec			Google Streetview; Citations:
Czech Republic	Palacký University Olomouc	Olomouc 49°35′33″N 17°15′48″E 11.42 deg/hour 274.12 deg/day	25.5 m Period : 10.13 sec	Mass : 37.0 kg		Foucaultovo kyvadlo v Olomouci on YouTube; Citations:
Czech Republic	Letná Water Tower	Prague 50°06′01″N 14°25′12″E 11.51 deg/hour 276.18 deg/day				Citations:
Czech Republic	Czech Technical University in Prague	Prague 50°04′34″N 14°25′08″E 11.5 deg/hour 276.08 deg/day	21.0 m Period : 9.19 sec	Mass : 34.0 kg		Citations:
Czech Republic	Faculty of Mathematics and Physics, Charles University	Prague 50°04′11″N 14°25′41″E 11.5 deg/hour 276.06 deg/day	21.0 m Period : 9.19 sec	Mass : 18.0 kg		Citations:
Denmark	Steno Museum	Aarhus 56°09′56″N 10°12′10″E 12.46 deg/hour 299.03 deg/day	11.0 m Period : 6.65 sec	Mass : 32.5 kg		Citations:
Denmark	University of Copenhagen	Copenhagen 55°41′17″N 12°34′54″E 12.39 deg/hour 297.35 deg/day	25.0 m Period : 10.03 sec	Mass : 130.0 kg		Pendulum of Foucault in Geocenter on YouTube; Citations:
Denmark	Trafiktårn Øst	Copenhagen 55°39′44″N 12°33′23″E 12.39 deg/hour 297.26 deg/day				Trafiktårn Øst, København on YouTube; Citations:
Estonia	University of Tartu Museum	Tartu 58°22′49″N 26°42′55″E 12.77 deg/hour 306.56 deg/day	16.78 m Period : 8.22 sec	Mass : 75.0 kg		El péndulo de Foucault qué hace visible la rotación de la Tierra on YouTube; Citations:
Finland	Water Tower, Eurajoki	Eurajoki, Satakunta 61°11′50″N 21°43′27″E 13.14 deg/hour 315.46 deg/day	40.0 m Period : 12.69 sec	Mass : 110.0 kg		Google Streetview; Citations:
Finland	University of Turku	Turku, Southwest Finland 60°27′18″N 22°17′04″E 13.05 deg/hour 313.19 deg/day				Citations:
Finland	Heureka	Vantaa, Uusimaa 60°17′15″N 25°02′26″E 13.03 deg/hour 312.67 deg/day				Google Streetview; Heureka Science Museum : Museum Series on YouTube; Citations:
France	Musée du Temps	Besançon, Doubs 47°14′09″N 6°01′36″E 11.01 deg/hour 264.3 deg/day	13.11 m Period : 7.26 sec	Mass : 17.5 kg		Slinger van Foucault on YouTube; Citations:
France	Près-la-Rose Science Park	Montbéliard, Doubs 47°30′18″N 6°47′45″E 11.06 deg/hour 265.44 deg/day				Google Streetview; Citations:
France	Toulouse Observatory	Toulouse, Haute-Garonne 43°36′44″N 1°27′45″E 10.35 deg/hour 248.32 deg/day				Citations:
France	Centre de sciences Cosmocité	Le Pont-de-Claix, Isère 45°08′26″N 5°42′08″E 10.63 deg/hour 255.18 deg/day	15.0 m Period : 7.77 sec			Citations:
France	Église Saint-Jean de Lapte	Lapte, Haute-Loire 45°11′11″N 4°13′01″E 10.64 deg/hour 255.39 deg/day				Citations:
France	Saint Clement Abbey of Metz	Metz, Moselle (department) 49°07′29″N 6°10′33″E 11.34 deg/hour 272.21 deg/day				Citations:
France	Musée des Arts et Métiers	Paris 48°51′58″N 2°21′18″E 11.3 deg/hour 271.14 deg/day	12.5 m Period : 7.09 sec	Mass : 28.3 kg		Google Streetview; Le Pendule de Foucault – Musée des Arts et Métiers on YouTube; Citations:
France	Panthéon	Paris 48°50′46″N 2°20′46″E 11.29 deg/hour 271.06 deg/day	67.0 m Period : 16.42 sec	Mass : 28.0 kg		This is the place where Léon Foucault conducted his public experiment in 1851. The pendulum experiment has been recreated here since 1995.: Google Streetview; Le pendule de Foucault au Panthéon on YouTube; Citations:
France	Château de Pignerolle	Saint-Barthélemy-d'Anjou, Maine-et-Loire 47°28′08″N 0°28′27″W 11.05 deg/hour 265.29 deg/day				Citations:
France	Le Havre Normandy University	Le Havre, Seine-Maritime 49°29′44″N 0°07′41″E 11.41 deg/hour 273.73 deg/day	20.0 m Period : 8.97 sec			Le pendule de Foucault de la bibliothèque Universitaire du Havr on YouTube; Citations:
Germany	SAP, Headquoters	Baden-Württemberg 49°17′40″N 8°38′35″E 11.37 deg/hour 272.91 deg/day				Google Streetview; Citations:
Germany	Heidelberg University	Heidelberg, Baden-Württemberg 49°24′59″N 8°40′19″E 11.39 deg/hour 273.4 deg/day	10.96 m Period : 6.64 sec	Mass : 68.7 kg		Foucault Pendulum Timelapse on YouTube; Live Camera; Citations:
Germany	Helmholtz-Gymnasium Heidelberg	Heidelberg, Baden-Württemberg 49°23′44″N 8°41′18″E 11.39 deg/hour 273.32 deg/day				Citations:
Germany	University of Konstanz	Konstanz, Baden-Württemberg 47°41′26″N 9°11′13″E 11.09 deg/hour 266.23 deg/day				Citations:
Germany	LMU Munich	Munich, Bavaria 48°16′08″N 11°40′26″E 11.19 deg/hour 268.66 deg/day	20.0 m Period : 8.97 sec	Mass : 12.0 kg		Live Camera; Citations:
Germany	Deutsches Museum	Munich, Bavaria 48°07′47″N 11°34′55″E 11.17 deg/hour 268.08 deg/day	60.0 m Period : 15.54 sec	Mass : 30.0 kg		Das Foucault'sche Pendel on YouTube; Citations:
Germany	German Museum of Technology	Berlin 52°29′56″N 13°22′41″E 11.9 deg/hour 285.6 deg/day	18.0 m Period : 8.51 sec			Foucaultsches Pendel im Spektrum Berlin on YouTube; Foucaultsches Pendel - Realaufnahme on YouTube; Citations:
Germany	WISTA	Berlin 52°25′46″N 13°32′15″E 11.89 deg/hour 285.34 deg/day	16.0 m Period : 8.02 sec	Mass : 25.0 kg		Citations:
Germany	Hamburg University of Applied Sciences	Hamburg 53°33′22″N 10°01′21″E 12.07 deg/hour 289.6 deg/day				Citations:
Germany	Zuerich House	Hamburg 53°32′53″N 9°59′42″E 12.07 deg/hour 289.57 deg/day				Citations:
Germany	Experiminta	Frankfurt, Hesse 50°06′56″N 8°38′52″E 11.51 deg/hour 276.24 deg/day				Citations:
Germany	Orangerie (Kassel)	Kassel, Hesse 51°18′37″N 9°30′03″E 11.71 deg/hour 281 deg/day				Citations:
Germany	University of Göttingen	Göttingen, Lower Saxony 51°33′30″N 9°56′47″E 11.75 deg/hour 281.97 deg/day		Shape : Cylinder		Citations:
Germany	Osnabrück University	Osnabrück, Lower Saxony 52°17′05″N 8°01′30″E 11.87 deg/hour 284.78 deg/day	19.5 m Period : 8.86 sec	Mass : 70.0 kg		Live Camera; Citations:
Germany	University of Greifswald	Greifswald, Mecklenburg-Vorpommern 54°05′29″N 13°24′14″E 12.15 deg/hour 291.58 deg/day				Citations:
Germany	University of Rostock	Rostock, Mecklenburg-Vorpommern 54°04′41″N 12°06′29″E 12.15 deg/hour 291.53 deg/day	16.0 m Period : 8.02 sec			Citations:
Germany	Phänomenta Lüdenscheid	Lüdenscheid, North Rhine-Westphalia 51°13′19″N 7°37′43″E 11.69 deg/hour 280.65 deg/day				Google Streetview; 180 Exponate : Foucault'sches Pendel on YouTube; Foucault'sches Pendel, Phänomenta, Lüdenscheid, 24.02.20 on YouTube; Citations:
Germany	Dominican Church	Münster, North Rhine-Westphalia 51°57′43″N 7°37′51″E 11.81 deg/hour 283.54 deg/day	28.75 m Period : 10.76 sec	Mass : 48.0 kg		An installation by Gerhard Richter: "Two Gray Double Mirrors for a Pendulum".: Foucaultsches Pendel : Gerhard Richter Dominikanerkirche Münster on YouTube; Citations:
Germany	Gymnasium Verl	Verl, North Rhine-Westphalia 51°53′01″N 8°30′16″E 11.8 deg/hour 283.23 deg/day				Citations:
Germany	University of Wuppertal, Campus II	Wuppertal, North Rhine-Westphalia 51°14′44″N 7°08′59″E 11.7 deg/hour 280.74 deg/day	2.1 m Period : 2.91 sec	Mass : 1.75 kg		Citations:
Germany	University of Koblenz	Koblenz, Rhineland-Palatinate 50°21′49″N 7°33′32″E 11.55 deg/hour 277.24 deg/day				Citations:
Germany	Dynamikum	Pirmasens, Rhineland-Palatinate 49°12′07″N 7°35′55″E 11.36 deg/hour 272.53 deg/day	12.18 m Period : 7 sec			Google Streetview; Citations:
Germany	Water Tower, Rockenhausen	Rockenhausen, Rhineland-Palatinate 49°37′44″N 7°49′03″E 11.43 deg/hour 274.27 deg/day	10.72 m Period : 6.57 sec	Mass : 30.0 kg		The Foucault pendulum was installed when the interior of the water tower used to supply water to steam locomotives at the station was renovated in 2021. Citations:
Germany	University of Trier	Trier, Rhineland-Palatinate 49°44′50″N 6°40′30″E 11.45 deg/hour 274.75 deg/day	27.0 m Period : 10.42 sec			Citations:
Germany	Geschwister-Scholl-Oberschule Auerbach/Vogtland	Auerbach (Vogtland) Saxony 50°30′34″N 12°23′40″E 11.58 deg/hour 277.82 deg/day				Das größte Foucault-Pendel im Vogtland in Aktion Teil 2 on YouTube; Citations:
Germany	Technical Collections, Dresden	Dresden, Saxony 51°02′31″N 13°47′52″E 11.66 deg/hour 279.94 deg/day				Citations:
Germany	Westsächsische Hochschule Zwickau	Zwickau, Saxony 50°42′57″N 12°29′45″E 11.61 deg/hour 278.64 deg/day	10.8 m Period : 6.59 sec	Mass : 35.0 kg		Citations:
Germany	Jahrtausendturm	Magdeburg, Saxony-Anhalt 52°08′20″N 11°39′59″E 11.84 deg/hour 284.22 deg/day	41.7 m Period : 12.95 sec			Google Streetview; Citations:
Greece	University of Patras	Rio, Greece 38°18′06″N 21°49′00″E 9.3 deg/hour 223.13 deg/day				Citations:
Hungary	University of Miskolc	Miskolc, Borsod–Abaúj–Zemplén County 48°04′53″N 20°45′52″E 11.16 deg/hour 267.87 deg/day	10.4 m Period : 6.47 sec	Mass : 45.0 kg		Google Streetview; Foucault Pendulum – Foucault inga on YouTube; Citations:
Hungary	Eötvös Loránd University	Budapest 47°28′27″N 19°03′40″E 11.05 deg/hour 265.31 deg/day				Citations:
Hungary	Water Tower, Szeged	Szeged, Csongrád-Csanád County 46°15′30″N 20°09′01″E 10.84 deg/hour 260.09 deg/day				Citations:
Hungary	Agora Science Adventure Center	Debrecen, Hajdú–Bihar County 47°33′29″N 21°37′11″E 11.07 deg/hour 265.67 deg/day	20.0 m Period : 8.97 sec	Mass : 40.0 kg		Citations:
Hungary	Mures-Bréda Castle	Lőkösháza, Békés County 46°26′57″N 21°14′28″E 10.87 deg/hour 260.91 deg/day	15.0 m Period : 7.77 sec			Foucault-inga Lőkösházán on YouTube; Citations:
Iceland	Orkuveita Reykjavíkur	Reykjavík 64°07′13″N 21°48′05″W 13.5 deg/hour 323.9 deg/day				Pendúll Foucault Orkuveita on YouTube; Citations:
Ireland	Experiment; Grand Canal Dock railway station	Dublin 53°20′22″N 6°14′21″W 12.03 deg/hour 288.79 deg/day				Citations:
Italy	University of Naples Federico II	Naples, Campania 40°50′25″N 14°11′09″E 9.81 deg/hour 235.42 deg/day	12.0 m Period : 6.95 sec	Mass : 23.0 kg		Citations:
Italy	Liceo Scientifico Galileo Galilei in Siena	Catania 37°32′06″N 15°06′21″E 9.14 deg/hour 219.33 deg/day	19.0 m Period : 8.74 sec	Mass : 30.0 kg		Pendolo di Foucault Liceo Galilei Siena on YouTube; Citations:
Italy	University of Catania, Department of Physics and Astronomy "Ettore Majorana"	Catania 37°31′30″N 15°04′20″E 9.14 deg/hour 219.28 deg/day	17.0 m Period : 8.27 sec	Mass : 40.0 kg		Citations:
Italy	Removed; Church of San Petronio, Bologna	Bologna, Emilia-Romagna 44°29′34″N 11°20′35″E 10.51 deg/hour 252.3 deg/day	19.5 m Period : 8.86 sec	Mass : 9.0 kg Material : Copper		Pendolo di Foucault in San Petronio (Bologna) on YouTube; Citations:
Italy	Removed; Museo Nazionale Scienza e Tecnologia Leonardo da Vinci in Milano	Milan, Lombardy 45°27′45″N 9°10′14″E 10.69 deg/hour 256.6 deg/day	15.0 m Period : 7.77 sec	Mass : 25.0 kg		Citations:
Italy	Temporary; Tradate Astronomical Observatory FOAM13	Tradate, Lombardy 45°42′44″N 8°55′53″E 10.74 deg/hour 257.7 deg/day	12.5 m Period : 7.09 sec	Mass : 15.0 kg		Exhibit working on and off on request. Citations:
Italy	Balì Museum	Colli al Metauro, Marche 43°45′22″N 12°53′25″E 10.37 deg/hour 248.97 deg/day	14.0 m Period : 7.51 sec	Mass : 20.0 kg		Exhibit operated manually only on request. Citations:
Italy	University of Cagliari	Monserrato, Sardinia 39°16′16″N 9°07′21″E 9.49 deg/hour 227.88 deg/day	10.4 m Period : 6.47 sec	Mass : 26.0 kg		Pendolo di Foucault: Museo di Fisica di Sardegna (Università di Cagliari) on YouTube; Live Camera; Citations:
Italy	Villa Mondragone	Monte Porzio Catone, Lazio 41°48′33″N 12°41′45″E 10 deg/hour 240 deg/day				Citations:
Italy	Palazzo della Ragione, Padua	Padua, Veneto 45°24′26″N 11°52′32″E 10.68 deg/hour 256.36 deg/day	20.0 m Period : 8.97 sec	Mass : 13.0 kg		Google Streetview; Pendolo di Foucault al palazzo della Ragione di Padova on YouTube; Citations:
Italy	San Giovanni in Foro, Verona	Verona, Veneto 45°26′35″N 10°59′42″E 10.69 deg/hour 256.52 deg/day				Citations:
Italy	Liceo Scientifico Statale "Angelo Messedaglia"	Verona, Veneto 45°26′03″N 10°59′40″E 10.69 deg/hour 256.48 deg/day				Citations:
Latvia	Planed; Riga Radio and TV Tower	Riga 56°55′26″N 24°08′13″E 12.57 deg/hour 301.66 deg/day				A 2017 renovation plan called for the inclusion of the world's largest Foucault pendulum, but this was shelved until a review in 2024. Citations:
Liechtenstein	Liechtensteinisches Gymnasium	Vaduz 47°09′20″N 9°30′13″E 11 deg/hour 263.95 deg/day				Das Foucault-Pendel am Liechtensteinischen Gymnasium on YouTube; Citations:
Lithuania	Church of St. Johns, Vilnius	Vilnius 54°40′57″N 25°17′17″E 12.24 deg/hour 293.75 deg/day	35.0 m Period : 11.87 sec	Mass : 34.0 kg		Google Streetview; Fuko švytuoklė Šv. Jonų bažnyčios varpinėje/Le pendule de Foucault/Foucault pendulum on YouTube; Fuko švytuoklė Šv. Jonų bažnyčios varpinėje on YouTube; Citations:
Moldova	Technical University of Moldova	Chișinău 47°01′50″N 28°49′26″E 10.98 deg/hour 263.42 deg/day	17.0 m Period : 8.27 sec	Mass : 105.0 kg		Pendulum Foucault - UTM on YouTube; Citations:
Netherlands	Radboud University Nijmegen	Nijmegen, Gelderland 51°49′26″N 5°52′07″E 11.79 deg/hour 283 deg/day	13.5 m Period : 7.37 sec			slinger van FouCault Uni Nijmegen on YouTube; De slinger in het Huygensgebouw on YouTube; Citations:
Netherlands	Grote Kerk, Haarlem	Haarlem, North Holland 52°22′36″N 4°37′20″E 11.88 deg/hour 285.13 deg/day				Slingerproef van Foucault - Bavo Haarlem on YouTube; Citations:
Netherlands	Water Tower, Axel	Terneuzen, Zeeland 51°15′31″N 3°54′34″E 11.7 deg/hour 280.79 deg/day				Citations:
Netherlands	Grote of Onze-Lieve-Vrouwekerk, Veere	Veere, Zeeland 51°32′50″N 3°40′04″E 11.75 deg/hour 281.92 deg/day				Slinger van Foucault grote kerk Veere on YouTube; Citations:
Norway	University of Oslo	Oslo 59°56′16″N 10°43′08″E 12.98 deg/hour 311.57 deg/day	14.1 m Period : 7.53 sec	Mass : 32.0 kg		Citations:
Norway	The Science Factory	Sandnes, Rogaland 58°51′05″N 5°43′52″E 12.84 deg/hour 308.1 deg/day	11.2 m Period : 6.71 sec	Mass : 60.0 kg		Citations:
Norway	Norwegian University of Science and Technology	Trondheim, Sør-Trøndelag 63°24′57″N 10°24′26″E 13.41 deg/hour 321.94 deg/day	25.0 m Period : 10.03 sec	Mass : 40.0 kg		Citations:
Norway	Borgarsyssel Museum	Sarpsborg, Østfold 59°16′46″N 11°07′22″E 12.9 deg/hour 309.48 deg/day				Citations:
Poland	Adam Mickiewicz University in Poznań	Poznań, Greater Poland Voivodeship 52°28′02″N 16°55′47″E 11.9 deg/hour 285.48 deg/day	10.0 m Period : 6.34 sec	Mass : 52.0 kg		Citations:
Poland	Mill of Knowledge Modernity Centre in Toruń	Toruń, Kuyavian–Pomeranian Voivodeship 53°01′35″N 18°37′39″E 11.98 deg/hour 287.61 deg/day	22.0 m Period : 9.41 sec	Mass : 35.0 kg		Google Streetview; Najdłuższe stale działające wahadło Foucaulta w Polsce on YouTube; Citations:
Poland	Nicolaus Copernicus University in Toruń	Toruń, Kuyavian–Pomeranian Voivodeship 53°01′02″N 18°36′11″E 11.98 deg/hour 287.57 deg/day	15.7 m Period : 7.95 sec	Mass : 66.6 kg		Jak działa Wahadło Foucaulta? on YouTube; Citations:
Poland	Saints Peter and Paul Church, Kraków	Kraków, Lesser Poland Voivodeship 50°03′25″N 19°56′21″E 11.5 deg/hour 276.01 deg/day	46.5 m Period : 13.68 sec	Mass : 25.0 kg		Wahadło Foucaulta w Krakowie on YouTube; Citations:
Poland	EC1 Science and Technology Center in Łódź	Łódź, Łódź Voivodeship 51°46′02″N 19°28′06″E 11.78 deg/hour 282.78 deg/day	36.0 m Period : 12.04 sec	Mass : 121.0 kg		Google Streetview; Citations:
Poland	Copernicus Science Centre	Warsaw, Masovian Voivodeship 52°14′32″N 21°01′43″E 11.86 deg/hour 284.62 deg/day	16.0 m Period : 8.02 sec	Mass : 242.0 kg		Google Streetview; Wahadło Foucaulta – Centrum Nauki Kopernik on YouTube; Citations:
Poland	Silesian University of Technology	Warsaw, Masovian Voivodeship 52°12′42″N 20°59′03″E 11.85 deg/hour 284.5 deg/day	22.0 m Period : 9.41 sec	Mass : 55.0 kg		Citations:
Poland	University of Białystok	Białystok, Podlaskie Voivodeship 53°06′31″N 23°09′16″E 12 deg/hour 287.92 deg/day	10.5 m Period : 6.5 sec			Facebook; Citations:
Poland	Gdańsk University of Technology	Gdańsk, Pomeranian Voivodeship 54°22′17″N 18°37′09″E 12.19 deg/hour 292.61 deg/day	26.0 m Period : 10.23 sec	Mass : 64.0 kg		Wahadło Foucaulta na Politechnice Gdańskiej on YouTube; Citations:
Poland	Jan Kochanowski University	Kielce, Świętokrzyskie Voivodeship 50°52′52″N 20°39′23″E 11.64 deg/hour 279.3 deg/day	27.0 m Period : 10.42 sec			Citations:
Poland	Radziejowski Tower in Frombork	Frombork, Warmian–Masurian Voivodeship 54°21′22″N 19°40′52″E 12.19 deg/hour 292.56 deg/day	28.5 m Period : 10.71 sec	Mass : 46.0 kg		Google Streetview; Pokaz eksperymentu Foucaulta on YouTube; Fuko švytuoklė 1 on YouTube; Citations:
Poland	Ducal Castle, Szczecin	Szczecin, West Pomeranian Voivodeship 53°25′36″N 14°33′36″E 12.05 deg/hour 289.11 deg/day	28.5 m Period : 10.71 sec	Mass : 76.0 kg		Citations:
Portugal	University of Coimbra	Coimbra, Coimbra District 40°12′27″N 8°25′28″W 9.68 deg/hour 232.4 deg/day				Citations:
Portugal	Pavilion of Knowledge - Science Alive Center	Lisbon, Lisbon District 38°45′45″N 9°05′44″W 9.39 deg/hour 225.39 deg/day	35.0 m Period : 11.87 sec	Mass : 250.0 kg		Módulo: Pêndulo de Foucault on YouTube; Citations:
Portugal	Estremoz Science Centre	Estremoz, Évora District 38°50′34″N 7°35′04″W 9.41 deg/hour 225.79 deg/day				Citations:
Romania	University of Oradea	Oradea, Bihor County 47°02′41″N 21°55′14″E 10.98 deg/hour 263.48 deg/day	16.0 m Period : 8.02 sec	Mass : 60.0 kg		Citations:
Romania	Charles de Gaulle Plaza	Bucharest 44°27′55″N 26°05′14″E 10.51 deg/hour 252.17 deg/day				Citations:
Romania	Gheorghe Asachi Technical University of Iași	Arecaceae, Iași County 47°09′08″N 27°35′20″E 11 deg/hour 263.94 deg/day	19.6 m Period : 8.88 sec	Mass : 28.0 kg		Citations:
Romania	Vasile Alecsandri National College (Galați)	45°26′27″N 28°03′04″E 10.69 deg/hour 256.51 deg/day				Citations:
Russian Federation	St. Petersburg Planetarium	Saint Petersburg, Leningrad Oblast 59°57′19″N 30°18′41″E 12.98 deg/hour 311.63 deg/day	8.0 m Period : 5.67 sec			Маятник Фуко on YouTube; Citations:
Russian Federation	Removed; Saint Isaac's Cathedral	Saint Petersburg, Leningrad Oblast 59°56′03″N 30°18′20″E 12.98 deg/hour 311.56 deg/day	98.0 m Period : 19.86 sec			It was in operation from 1931 to 1986.: Маятник Фуко в Исаакиевском соборе, 1979 год on YouTube; Citations:
Russian Federation	Bauman Moscow State Technical University	Moscow, Moscow Oblast 55°46′01″N 37°41′08″E 12.4 deg/hour 297.63 deg/day				Google Streetview; Citations:
Russian Federation	Moscow Planetarium	Moscow, Moscow Oblast 55°45′41″N 37°35′01″E 12.4 deg/hour 297.61 deg/day	16.0 m Period : 8.02 sec	Mass : 50.0 kg		Маятник Фуко on YouTube; Citations:
Russian Federation	Murmansk Regional Universal Scientific Library	Murmansk, Murmansk Oblast 68°58′11″N 33°05′14″E 14 deg/hour 336.02 deg/day				Маятник Фуко on YouTube; Citations:
Russian Federation	Novosibirsk Planetarium	Novosibirsk, Novosibirsk Oblast 54°58′52″N 83°02′09″E 12.28 deg/hour 294.83 deg/day				Маятник Фуко on YouTube; Citations:
Russian Federation	Penza Planetarium	Penza, Penza Oblast 53°11′13″N 45°00′07″E 12.01 deg/hour 288.21 deg/day	12.0 m Period : 6.95 sec	Mass : 20.0 kg		Citations:
Russian Federation	Smolensk Planetarium	Smolensk, Smolensk Oblast 54°47′15″N 32°02′50″E 12.26 deg/hour 294.13 deg/day	12.0 m Period : 6.95 sec			Citations:
Russian Federation	Ulyanovsk State University	Ulyanovsk, Ulyanovsk Oblast 54°18′14″N 48°22′00″E 12.18 deg/hour 292.36 deg/day				Креативные пространства УлГУ. Маятник Фуко on YouTube; Citations:
Russian Federation	Volgograd Planetarium	Volgograd, Volgograd Oblast 48°42′52″N 44°31′28″E 11.27 deg/hour 270.52 deg/day				Маятник Фуко. on YouTube; Citations:
Serbia	University of Belgrade	Belgrade 44°48′22″N 20°28′40″E 10.57 deg/hour 253.7 deg/day	9.0 m Period : 6.02 sec	Mass : 30.0 kg		Citations:
Slovakia	Comenius University in Bratislava	Bratislava 48°09′04″N 17°04′13″E 11.17 deg/hour 268.17 deg/day	13.0 m Period : 7.23 sec	Mass : 63.0 kg		Jediné Foucaultovo kyvadlo na Slovensku on YouTube; Citations:
Spain	University of Almería, Building A4	Almería, Andalusia 36°49′45″N 2°24′25″W 8.99 deg/hour 215.8 deg/day				Instagram; Citations:
Spain	University of Granada	Granada, Andalusia 37°10′53″N 3°36′30″W 9.07 deg/hour 217.56 deg/day	45.0 m Period : 13.46 sec	Mass : 500.0 kg		Citations:
Spain	Parque de las Ciencias (Granada)	Granada, Andalusia 37°09′43″N 3°36′15″W 9.06 deg/hour 217.47 deg/day				Google Streetview; Parque de las Ciencias de Granada: Péndulo de Foucault on YouTube; Citations:
Spain	University of Jaén, Building C3	Jaén, Andalusia 37°47′18″N 3°46′36″W 9.19 deg/hour 220.59 deg/day				Google Streetview; Citations:
Spain	Science and Technology Park of Cantabria	Santander, Spain 43°27′15″N 3°52′08″W 10.32 deg/hour 247.6 deg/day				Citations:
Spain	University of Burgos	Burgos, Province of Burgos, Castile and León 42°20′33″N 3°43′35″W 10.1 deg/hour 242.48 deg/day				Péndulo de Foucault on YouTube; Citations:
Spain	University of Salamanca	Salamanca, Province of Salamanca, Castile and León 40°57′39″N 5°40′10″W 9.83 deg/hour 236 deg/day	11.5 m Period : 6.8 sec	Mass : 100.0 kg Material : Brass		Citations:
Spain	Valladolid Science Museum	Valladolid, Province of Valladolid, Castile and León 41°38′15″N 4°44′43″W 9.97 deg/hour 239.19 deg/day	11.0 m Period : 6.65 sec	Mass : 80.0 kg		Citations:
Spain	Autonomous University of Barcelona	Province of Barcelona, Catalonia 41°30′00″N 2°06′29″E 9.94 deg/hour 238.54 deg/day	7.0 m Period : 5.31 sec	Mass : 20.0 kg		Citations:
Spain	CosmoCaixa Barcelona	Barcelona, Province of Barcelona, Catalonia 41°24′45″N 2°07′54″E 9.92 deg/hour 238.13 deg/day				Google Streetview; Citations:
Spain	Casa de las Ciencias	A Coruña, Province of A Coruña 43°21′44″N 8°24′45″W 10.3 deg/hour 247.18 deg/day	14.0 m Period : 7.51 sec	Mass : 125.0 kg		El péndulo de Foucault on YouTube; Citations:
Spain	Royal Observatory of Madrid	Madrid, Community of Madrid 40°24′30″N 3°41′15″W 9.72 deg/hour 233.36 deg/day				Google Streetview; Citations:
Spain	Ciudad de las Artes y las Ciencias	Valencia, Province of Valencia, Valencian Community 39°27′22″N 0°21′06″W 9.53 deg/hour 228.78 deg/day	30.0 m Period : 10.99 sec			Google Streetview; Citations:
Spain	University of Santiago de Compostela	42°52′34″N 8°33′38″W 10.21 deg/hour 244.95 deg/day	12.0 m Period : 6.95 sec			Citations:
Sweden	E.ON, corporate office	Malmö 55°35′54″N 13°01′25″E 12.38 deg/hour 297.03 deg/day		Material : Coal		Citations:
Sweden	Carlsund utbildningscentrum	Motala 58°32′52″N 15°01′01″E 12.8 deg/hour 307.11 deg/day	6.0 m Period : 4.91 sec	Mass : 13.0 kg		Citations:
Sweden	Bessemerskolan	Sandviken 60°37′28″N 16°45′49″E 13.07 deg/hour 313.71 deg/day				Citations:
Sweden	Ångström Laboratory	Uppsala 59°50′23″N 17°38′49″E 12.97 deg/hour 311.26 deg/day	28.0 m Period : 10.62 sec			Citations:
Switzerland	Centro Professionale Tecnico Biasca	Biasca 46°20′59″N 8°58′12″E 10.85 deg/hour 260.48 deg/day				Citations:
Switzerland	Lycée cantonal de Porrentruy	Porrentruy 47°24′49″N 7°04′31″E 11.04 deg/hour 265.05 deg/day				Foucaultsches Pendel in Pruntrut on YouTube; Citations:
Switzerland	Café de la Grenette, Sion	Sion, Switzerland 46°14′04″N 7°21′38″E 10.83 deg/hour 259.98 deg/day	0.19 m Period : 0.87 sec			Citations:
Switzerland	Natural History Museum Solothurn	Solothurn, Canton of Solothurn 47°12′26″N 7°32′22″E 11.01 deg/hour 264.17 deg/day				Citations:
Switzerland	Haute École d'ingénierie et de gestion du canton de Vaud	Yverdon-les-Bains 46°46′52″N 6°38′51″E 10.93 deg/hour 262.35 deg/day				Citations:
Ukraine	Kharkiv Planetarium	Kharkiv, Kharkiv Oblast 49°59′45″N 36°13′43″E 11.49 deg/hour 275.76 deg/day				Google Streetview; В Харьковском планетарии установили маятник Фуко on YouTube; Citations:
Ukraine	Kyiv Polytechnic Institute	Kyiv 50°26′59″N 30°27′23″E 11.57 deg/hour 277.58 deg/day	22.0 m Period : 9.41 sec	Mass : 43.0 kg		Google Streetview; Маятник Фуко библиотека КПИ on YouTube; Citations:
Ukraine	Museum of Space Exploration	Pereiaslav, Kyiv Oblast 50°03′35″N 31°28′33″E 11.5 deg/hour 276.02 deg/day				Citations:
Ukraine	Adrenaline City	Lutsk, Volyn Oblast 50°46′57″N 25°22′04″E 11.62 deg/hour 278.91 deg/day				Google Streetview; Citations:
Ukraine	Uzhhorod National University	Uzhhorod, Zakarpattia Oblast 48°38′07″N 22°17′26″E 11.26 deg/hour 270.19 deg/day				Google Streetview; В УжНУ функціонує маятник безперервної дії on YouTube; Citations:
Ukraine (Effective control by Russia)	Donetsk National Technical University	Donetsk 47°59′38″N 37°48′14″E 11.15 deg/hour 267.51 deg/day	6.75 m Period : 5.21 sec	Mass : 30.0 kg		The government of the Donetsk People's Republic, which pro-Russian forces claimed independence from during the War in Donbas, supported the project and held an unveiling ceremony in 2018.: Открытие маятника Фуко в ДонНТУ on YouTube; Citations:
United Kingdom	Devonshire Dome	Buxton, Derbyshire 53°15′36″N 1°55′00″W 12.02 deg/hour 288.49 deg/day				Citations:
United Kingdom	Harris Museum	Preston, Lancashire, Lancashire 53°45′33″N 2°41′54″W 12.1 deg/hour 290.35 deg/day	35.0 m (115.0 feet) Period : 11.87 sec	Mass : 13.5 kg (30.0 pound)		Google Streetview; The longest Foucault Pendulum in the UK on YouTube; Facebook; Instagram; Citations:
United Kingdom	Science Museum, London	London 51°29′50″N 0°10′29″W 11.74 deg/hour 281.73 deg/day	22.45 m Period : 9.51 sec	Mass : 9.0 kg Shape : Cylinder		The pendulum with parametric amplification designed by physicist Brian Pippard of the Cavendish Laboratory.: Google Streetview; Foucault Pendulum at London Science Museum on YouTube; Citations:
United Kingdom	Manchester Conference Centre	Manchester 53°28′26″N 2°14′07″W 12.05 deg/hour 289.29 deg/day				Google Streetview; Citations:
United Kingdom	University of Liverpool	Liverpool 53°24′16″N 2°57′43″W 12.04 deg/hour 289.03 deg/day	7.9 m Period : 5.64 sec			Foucault Pendulum on YouTube; Citations:
United Kingdom	Harlow Hill Tower	Harrogate, North Yorkshire 53°58′59″N 1°33′44″W 12.13 deg/hour 291.18 deg/day				Citations:
United Kingdom	University of Strathclyde Not currently operating	Glasgow, Scotland 55°51′45″N 4°14′50″W nominally 12.449 deg/hour	4.3258 m	Mass : 2.525 kg Shape : Cylinder; Material : 97% Copper		Citations:
United Kingdom	Not Operating; Princes Square	Glasgow, Scotland 55°51′33″N 4°15′12″W 12.41 deg/hour 297.96 deg/day				Citations:
United Kingdom	Uppingham School, Science Faculty	Ockham, Surrey 52°35′17″N 0°43′51″W 11.91 deg/hour 285.94 deg/day				There is also a Foucault pendulum at Uppingham Cairo, which is a branch of Uppingham School,. Citations:
United Kingdom	University of Warwick	Coventry, West Midlands (county) 52°22′57″N 1°33′49″W 11.88 deg/hour 285.16 deg/day				Citations:

== Africa ==
Country	Facility	Location	String	Bob	Image	Notes/Citations
Burundi	Experiment; Brasserie du Ruanda-Urundi	Bujumbura, Bujumbura Province 3°22′21″S 29°20′56″E 0.88 deg/hour 21.18 deg/day		Mass : 29.0 kg		This was done in 1956 at the Palace of Justice in Brussels, Belgium, using the pendulum used in the Foucault pendulum centenary experiment. Citations:
Egypt	Uppingham Cairo, 1584 Building	Giza Governorate 29°59′26″N 31°03′35″E 7.5 deg/hour 179.95 deg/day				A Uppingham Cairo is a branch of Uppingham School in England,.: Discover the Legacy of Uppingham Cairo's 1584 Building on YouTube; Citations:
South Africa	Albany Museum, South Africa	Makhanda, South Africa, Eastern Cape 33°18′48″S 26°31′19″E 8.24 deg/hour 197.72 deg/day				Citations:
South Africa	University of Pretoria	Pretoria, Gauteng 25°45′11″S 28°13′48″E 6.52 deg/hour 156.42 deg/day				Citations:
Tunisia	Science City, Tunis	Tunis, Tunis Governorate 36°50′58″N 10°11′18″E 9 deg/hour 215.9 deg/day				Facebook; Citations:

== North America ==
Country	Facility	Location	String	Bob	Image	Notes/Citations
Canada	University of Alberta	Edmonton, Alberta 53°31′42″N 113°31′34″W 12.06 deg/hour 289.49 deg/day	26.4 m Period : 10.31 sec			Citations:
Canada	University of British Columbia	British Columbia 49°15′59″N 123°15′07″W 11.37 deg/hour 272.79 deg/day				UBC Foucault Pendulum on YouTube; Foucault's Pendulum - 23 June 2016 on YouTube; Citations:
Canada	St. Andrew's College, Aurora	Aurora, Ontario 44°00′43″N 79°28′39″W 10.42 deg/hour 250.13 deg/day				Google Streetview; St. Andrew's Foucault Pendulum on YouTube; Citations:
Canada	Queen's University at Kingston, Stirling Hall	Kingston, Ontario 44°13′29″N 76°29′52″W 10.46 deg/hour 251.09 deg/day				FOUCAULT PENDULUM IN STIRLING HALL on YouTube; Citations:
Canada	Carleton University	Toronto, Ontario 43°39′38″N 79°23′53″W 10.36 deg/hour 248.54 deg/day				Citations:
Canada	Université de Montréal	Montreal, Quebec 45°30′10″N 73°36′52″W 10.7 deg/hour 256.78 deg/day	8.0 m Period : 5.67 sec	Mass : 10.0 kg		Citations:
Canada	École de technologie supérieure	Montreal, Quebec 45°29′41″N 73°33′47″W 10.7 deg/hour 256.75 deg/day				Google Streetview; Citations:
Canada	Cégep de Chicoutimi	Saguenay, Quebec 48°25′28″N 71°03′08″W 11.22 deg/hour 269.31 deg/day				Le pendule de Foucault du Cégep de Chicoutimi on YouTube; Citations:
Mexico	The Rolling Interactive Space	Ciudad Juárez 31°41′24″N 106°25′42″W 7.88 deg/hour 189.12 deg/day				TikTok; Citations:
Mexico	Universidad Autónoma Metropolitana	Mexico City 19°30′15″N 99°11′13″W 5.01 deg/hour 120.19 deg/day				Citations:
Mexico	Instituto Politécnico Nacional	Mexico City 19°29′46″N 99°08′01″W 5.01 deg/hour 120.15 deg/day				PÉNDULO DE FOUCAULT DE LA BIBLIOTECA NACIONAL DE CIENCIA Y TECNOLOGÍA DEL IPN EN ZACATENCO on YouTube; Citations:
Mexico	School of Military Engineering, Mexico	Mexico City 19°25′57″N 99°13′25″W 4.99 deg/hour 119.77 deg/day				Escuela Militar de Ingenieros on YouTube; Citations:
Mexico	Foucault's Pendulum Science Museum - Concyteq	Querétaro (city) 20°35′10″N 100°23′10″W 5.27 deg/hour 126.58 deg/day	28.0 m Period : 10.62 sec	Mass : 280.0 kg		Museo de Ciencia y Tecnología "El Péndulo" on YouTube; Citations:
Mexico	Tequisquiapan Pendulum	Tequisquiapan, Querétaro 20°31′18″N 99°53′38″W 5.26 deg/hour 126.2 deg/day				Google Streetview; El Centro Geográfico de México, monumento. Tequisquiapan, Querétaro on YouTube; Citations:
United States of America	Auburn University	Auburn, Alabama 32°36′03″N 85°29′07″W 8.08 deg/hour 193.96 deg/day		Mass : 106.6 kg (235.0 pound)		Foucault Pendulum @ Auburn University, 20 February 2025 on YouTube; Citations:
United States of America	University of Alaska Anchorage	Anchorage, Alaska 61°11′27″N 149°49′05″W 13.14 deg/hour 315.44 deg/day	15.8 m (52.0 feet) Period : 7.97 sec	Mass : 106.6 kg (235.0 pound)		Consortium Library Pendulum UAA Anchorage Alaska on YouTube; Citations:
United States of America	Arizona State University	Tempe, Arizona 33°25′15″N 111°55′53″W 8.26 deg/hour 198.28 deg/day	21.5 m (70.5 feet) Period : 9.3 sec	Mass : 106.6 kg (235.0 pound)		Citations:
United States of America	Hendrix College	Conway, Arkansas 35°06′02″N 92°26′34″W 8.63 deg/hour 207 deg/day				The only Foucault pendulum in Arkansas on YouTube; Citations:
United States of America	California State University, Bakersfield	Bakersfield, California 35°20′59″N 119°06′14″W 8.68 deg/hour 208.28 deg/day				Citations:
United States of America	Orange Coast College, Planetarium	Costa Mesa, California 33°40′11″N 117°54′46″W 8.32 deg/hour 199.59 deg/day		Mass : 106.6 kg (235.0 pound)		Foucault's Pendulum Time Lapse on YouTube; The Foucault Pendulum of the OCC Planetarium on YouTube; Citations:
United States of America	Fresno Pacific University	Fresno, California 36°43′39″N 119°44′10″W 8.97 deg/hour 215.28 deg/day	12.5 m (41.0 feet) Period : 7.09 sec	Mass : 106.6 kg (235.0 pound)		Citations:
United States of America	Forest Lawn Memorial Park (Long Beach)	Long Beach, California 33°50′38″N 118°10′15″W 8.35 deg/hour 200.5 deg/day		Mass : 106.6 kg (235.0 pound)		Citations:
United States of America	Occidental College, Hameetman Science Center	Los Angeles, California 34°07′32″N 118°12′41″W 8.42 deg/hour 201.96 deg/day				Foucault Pendulum, Occidental College on YouTube; Citations:
United States of America	Griffith Observatory	Los Angeles, California 34°07′06″N 118°18′01″W 8.41 deg/hour 201.93 deg/day	12.0 m Period : 6.95 sec	Mass : 100.0 kg		It has been installed since the museum opened in 1935. It appears in the movie La La Land.: Google Streetview; Griffith Observatory's Foucault Pendulum in Los Angeles on YouTube; Citations:
United States of America	Modesto Junior College, Science Community Center	Modesto, California 37°39′48″N 121°02′19″W 9.17 deg/hour 219.97 deg/day				Citations:
United States of America	Naval Postgraduate School	Monterey, California 36°35′49″N 121°52′26″W 8.94 deg/hour 214.63 deg/day				Citations:
United States of America	UCR College of Natural and Agricultural Sciences	Riverside, California 33°58′27″N 117°19′34″W 8.38 deg/hour 201.18 deg/day				Citations:
United States of America	California Department of Education	Sacramento, California 38°34′26″N 121°29′20″W 9.35 deg/hour 224.47 deg/day				Citations:
United States of America	California State University, Sacramento	Sacramento, California 38°33′38″N 121°25′17″W 9.35 deg/hour 224.4 deg/day				Google Streetview; Citations:
United States of America	Hartnell College	Salinas, California 36°40′24″N 121°40′00″W 8.96 deg/hour 215.01 deg/day				Citations:
United States of America	San Diego Natural History Museum	San Diego, California 32°43′55″N 117°08′50″W 8.11 deg/hour 194.66 deg/day	12.0 m Period : 6.95 sec	Mass : 106.6 kg (235.0 pound)		Google Streetview; San Diego Natural History Museum Pendulum on YouTube; Citations:
United States of America	California Academy of Sciences	San Francisco, California 37°46′12″N 122°27′56″W 9.19 deg/hour 220.5 deg/day	9.14 m (30.0 feet) Period : 6.06 sec	Mass : 106.6 kg (235.0 pound)		Google Streetview; Foucault Pendulum California Academy of Sciences Golden Gate Park San Francisco February 2020 on YouTube; Citations:
United States of America	Removed; Rosicrucian Egyptian Museum	San Jose, California 37°20′02″N 121°55′24″W 9.1 deg/hour 218.32 deg/day				Citations:
United States of America	Harker School	San Jose, California 37°19′02″N 121°58′14″W 9.09 deg/hour 218.24 deg/day				Citations:
United States of America	Thomas Aquinas College	Santa Paula, California 34°25′47″N 119°05′15″W 8.48 deg/hour 203.54 deg/day	7.5 m (25.0 feet) Period : 5.49 sec			Dr. Gregory L. Froelich (’83) explains the Foucault Pendulum on YouTube; Citations:
United States of America	West Valley College, Jean and E. Floyd Kvamme Planetarium	Saratoga, California 37°15′57″N 122°00′35″W 9.08 deg/hour 217.99 deg/day				Citations:
United States of America	Stag's Leap Wine Cellars	Yountville, California 38°23′58″N 122°19′31″W 9.32 deg/hour 223.61 deg/day				Citations:
United States of America	Adams State College	Alamosa, Colorado 37°28′16″N 105°52′49″W 9.13 deg/hour 219.01 deg/day				Citations:
United States of America	University of Colorado Boulder	Boulder, Colorado 40°00′29″N 105°16′04″W 9.64 deg/hour 231.44 deg/day	39.4 m (129.3 feet) Period : 12.59 sec	Mass : 167.3 kg (368.83-pound)		Citations:
United States of America	University of Colorado Colorado Springs	Colorado Springs, Colorado 38°53′37″N 104°48′05″W 9.42 deg/hour 226.03 deg/day				Citations:
United States of America	Avon Old Farms	Avon, Connecticut 41°46′29″N 72°50′18″W 9.99 deg/hour 239.83 deg/day				Citations:
United States of America	Removed; Peabody Museum of Natural History	New Haven, Connecticut 41°18′57″N 72°55′16″W 9.9 deg/hour 237.68 deg/day				It was installed in 1928. It was removed in 1960 and donated to the Chilean National Museum of Natural History, where it was installed for several years. Citations:
United States of America	The Children's Museum, Connecticut	West Hartford, Connecticut 41°47′52″N 72°44′07″W 10 deg/hour 239.94 deg/day				Citations:
United States of America	Colorado State University	Fort Collins, Colorado 40°34′31″N 105°04′57″W 9.76 deg/hour 234.16 deg/day				Google Streetview; Citations:
United States of America	Removed; Miami Dade College	Miami, Florida 25°40′25″N 80°22′27″W 6.5 deg/hour 155.97 deg/day				Citations:
United States of America	Elliott Museum	Sewall's Point, Florida 27°12′54″N 80°10′35″W 6.86 deg/hour 164.64 deg/day				Foucault's Pendulum at Elliott Museum (Stuart, FL) 11/22/22 on YouTube; Citations:
United States of America	University of South Florida	Tampa, Florida 28°03′43″N 82°24′51″W 7.06 deg/hour 169.35 deg/day				Google Streetview; Instagram; Citations:
United States of America	University of Central Florida	Orlando, Florida 28°35′59″N 81°12′03″W 7.18 deg/hour 172.33 deg/day				Facebook; Citations:
United States of America	Tellus Science Museum	Cartersville, Georgia 34°14′31″N 84°46′15″W 8.44 deg/hour 202.57 deg/day				Citations:
United States of America	Berry College	Mount Berry, Georgia 34°17′21″N 85°11′20″W 8.45 deg/hour 202.81 deg/day	15.0 m (50.0 feet) Period : 7.77 sec	Mass : 106.6 kg (235.0 pound)		Citations:
United States of America	Removed; Fermilab	Batavia, Dutch East Indies, Illinois 41°50′18″N 88°15′42″W 10.01 deg/hour 240.13 deg/day				Pendulum at Fermilab on YouTube; Citations:
United States of America	Museum of Science and Industry (Chicago)	Chicago, Illinois 41°47′25″N 87°34′57″W 10 deg/hour 239.91 deg/day	20.0 m (65.0 feet) Period : 8.97 sec	Mass : 300.0 kg		Google Streetview; Foucault Pendulum demonstrates earth's rotation – Griffin museum, Chicago on YouTube; Citations:
United States of America	Rock Valley College	Rockford, Illinois 42°18′27″N 88°59′33″W 10.1 deg/hour 242.32 deg/day				Citations:
United States of America	Wheaton College (Illinois)	Wheaton, Illinois 41°52′10″N 88°05′46″W 10.01 deg/hour 240.28 deg/day				Citations:
United States of America	Indiana State Museum	Indianapolis, Indiana 39°46′07″N 86°10′08″W 9.6 deg/hour 230.29 deg/day				Citations:
United States of America	Science Center of Iowa	Des Moines, Iowa 41°34′58″N 93°37′14″W 9.96 deg/hour 238.93 deg/day	12.0 m (41.0 feet) Period : 6.95 sec	Mass : 106.6 kg (235.0 pound)		Science Center of Iowa - Foucault Pendulum on YouTube; Citations:
United States of America	Fort Hays State University	Hays, Kansas 38°52′17″N 99°20′35″W 9.41 deg/hour 225.93 deg/day				Timelapse of Pendulum from above on university campus on YouTube; Citations:
United States of America	Removed; Kansas State Capitol	Topeka, Kansas 39°02′53″N 95°40′41″W 9.45 deg/hour 226.79 deg/day	50.0 m (163.0 feet) Period : 14.19 sec	Mass : 45.0 kg (105.0 pound); Material : Lead		Citations:
United States of America	Exploration Place	Wichita, Kansas 37°41′22″N 97°20′53″W 9.17 deg/hour 220.1 deg/day				Citations:
United States of America	Removed; Berea College	Berea, Kentucky 37°34′23″N 84°17′27″W 9.15 deg/hour 219.52 deg/day				Citations:
United States of America	Georgetown College	Georgetown, Kentucky 38°12′27″N 84°33′20″W 9.28 deg/hour 222.66 deg/day				Google Streetview; Citations:
United States of America	Northern Kentucky University	Highland Heights, Kentucky 39°01′57″N 84°27′59″W 9.45 deg/hour 226.71 deg/day				Citations:
United States of America	Lexington Public Library	Lexington, Kentucky 38°02′44″N 84°29′48″W 9.24 deg/hour 221.86 deg/day				Citations:
United States of America	Kentucky Science Center	Louisville, Kentucky 38°15′27″N 85°45′45″W 9.29 deg/hour 222.91 deg/day				Point of View of the Foucault pendulum at Kentucky Science Center on YouTube; Citations:
United States of America	University of Louisville, Grawemeyer Hall	Louisville, Kentucky 38°12′54″N 85°45′37″W 9.28 deg/hour 222.7 deg/day	22.0 m (72.0 feet) Period : 9.41 sec			Foucault pendulum demonstrating the Earth's rotation on YouTube; Citations:
United States of America	St. John's College (Annapolis/Santa Fe)	Annapolis, Maryland 38°58′57″N 76°29′34″W 9.44 deg/hour 226.47 deg/day				The Foucault Pendulum frames Earth's Rotation... or something like that on YouTube; Citations:
United States of America	West Nottingham Academy	Colora, Maryland 39°40′07″N 76°04′53″W 9.58 deg/hour 229.8 deg/day				Citations:
United States of America	Frostburg State University	Frostburg, Maryland 39°39′04″N 78°55′54″W 9.57 deg/hour 229.72 deg/day				Citations:
United States of America	Severn School, Creeden Hall	Severna Park, Maryland 39°04′08″N 76°32′56″W 9.45 deg/hour 226.89 deg/day				Citations:
United States of America	Museum of Science (Boston)	Boston, Massachusetts 42°22′03″N 71°04′17″W 10.11 deg/hour 242.6 deg/day				Foucault Pendulum on YouTube; Citations:
United States of America	MIT Lincoln Laboratory	Lexington, Massachusetts 42°27′34″N 71°15′55″W 10.13 deg/hour 243.02 deg/day	15.8 m (52.0 feet) Period : 7.97 sec			Citations:
United States of America	Smith College	Northampton, Massachusetts 42°19′02″N 72°38′22″W 10.1 deg/hour 242.36 deg/day	13.0 m (43.0 feet) Period : 7.23 sec	Mass : 106.6 kg (235.0 pound)		Instagram; Citations:
United States of America	Springfield Science Museum	Springfield, Massachusetts 42°06′16″N 72°35′09″W 10.06 deg/hour 241.37 deg/day				Citations:
United States of America	Besser Museum for Northeast Michigan	Alpena, Michigan 45°04′51″N 83°26′55″W 10.62 deg/hour 254.92 deg/day				Citations:
United States of America	Michigan Science Center	Detroit, Michigan 42°21′30″N 83°03′43″W 10.11 deg/hour 242.56 deg/day				Google Streetview; Facebook; Citations:
United States of America	Midland Center for the Arts	Midland, Michigan 43°37′27″N 84°14′59″W 10.35 deg/hour 248.37 deg/day	11.0 m (36.0 feet) Period : 6.65 sec	Mass : 104.0 kg (230.0 pound)		Citations:
United States of America	The Blake School (Minneapolis)	Minneapolis, Minnesota 44°58′10″N 93°17′38″W 10.6 deg/hour 254.42 deg/day				Citations:
United States of America	Meramec Caverns	Stanton, Missouri 38°14′28″N 91°05′32″W 9.28 deg/hour 222.83 deg/day				Google Streetview; The Pendulum Merrimac Caverns on YouTube; Citations:
United States of America	Western Security Bank	Billings, Montana 45°46′54″N 108°30′21″W 10.75 deg/hour 258.01 deg/day				Citations:
United States of America	University of Nebraska at Kearney	Kearney, Nebraska 40°42′00″N 99°05′45″W 9.78 deg/hour 234.76 deg/day				Citations:
United States of America	Dartmouth College, Sherman Fairchild Physical Sciences Center	Hanover, New Hampshire 43°42′20″N 72°17′11″W 10.36 deg/hour 248.74 deg/day	21.0 m (70.0 feet) Period : 9.19 sec	Mass : 118.0 kg (260.0 pound)		Dartmouth Professor Discusses Foucault's Pendulum on YouTube; Citations:
United States of America	St. Paul's School (New Hampshire)	Hanover, New Hampshire 43°11′42″N 71°34′25″W 10.27 deg/hour 246.41 deg/day				Citations:
United States of America	Albuquerque Academy	Albuquerque, New Mexico 35°09′05″N 106°33′07″W 8.64 deg/hour 207.27 deg/day	9.0 m (30.0 feet) Period : 6.02 sec	Mass : 100.0 kg (200.0 pound)		The Pendulums at Albuquerque Academy on YouTube; Citations:
United States of America	Buffalo Museum of Science	Buffalo, New York 42°54′21″N 78°50′36″W 10.21 deg/hour 245.09 deg/day				TikTok; Citations:
United States of America	State University of New York at Geneseo	Geneseo, New York 42°47′49″N 77°49′07″W 10.19 deg/hour 244.58 deg/day	23.0 m (75.0 feet) Period : 9.62 sec	Mass : 45.0 kg (100.0 pound)		Foucault Pendulum Geneseo on YouTube; Citations:
United States of America	Chaminade High School	Mineola, New York 40°44′44″N 73°39′03″W 9.79 deg/hour 234.97 deg/day	9.0 m (30.0 feet) Period : 6.02 sec	Mass : 90.0 kg (200.0 pound)		Citations:
United States of America	Children's Hospital at Montefiore	New York City, New York (state) 40°52′50″N 73°52′45″W 9.82 deg/hour 235.61 deg/day				This pendulum was designed by Tom Otterness.: Focault Pendulum 2.MOV on YouTube; Citations:
United States of America	United Nations General Assembly Building	New York City, New York (state) 40°45′01″N 73°58′03″W 9.79 deg/hour 235 deg/day	23.0 m (75.0 feet) Period : 9.62 sec	Mass : 90.0 kg (200.0 pound); Shape : Ball		It was donated by the Netherlands in 1955 and bears a message from Queen Juliana of the Netherlands.The pendulum was designed and built by the Philips Natuurkundig Laboratorium, and the pedestal was designed by architect Gerrit Rietveld.: Google Streetview; Foucault pendulum in UN building, New York on YouTube; Citations:
United States of America	Greensboro Science Center	Greensboro, North Carolina 36°07′48″N 79°50′02″W 8.84 deg/hour 212.26 deg/day				Transit of Mercury 2019 on YouTube; Foucault Pendulum Time Lapse on YouTube; Facebook; Citations:
United States of America	William McKinley Presidential Library and Museum	Canton, Ohio 40°48′22″N 81°23′36″W 9.8 deg/hour 235.26 deg/day				Fun Times! - Foucault Pendulum on YouTube; Citations:
United States of America	Xavier University	Cincinnati, Ohio 39°08′57″N 84°28′30″W 9.47 deg/hour 227.28 deg/day				Citations:
United States of America	Cleveland Museum of Natural History	Cleveland, Ohio 41°30′43″N 81°36′47″W 9.94 deg/hour 238.6 deg/day				Citations:
United States of America	COSI	Columbus, Ohio 39°57′34″N 83°00′24″W 9.63 deg/hour 231.21 deg/day	11.7 m (38.5 feet) Period : 6.86 sec			Google Streetview; COSI Science Center Pendulum, Columbus, OH on YouTube; Citations:
United States of America	University of Dayton	Dayton, Ohio 39°44′25″N 84°10′31″W 9.59 deg/hour 230.15 deg/day				Citations:
United States of America	Culler Hall (Miami University)	Oxford, Ohio 39°30′28″N 84°44′05″W 9.54 deg/hour 229.03 deg/day		Mass : 106.6 kg (235.0 pound)		Google Streetview; Citations:
United States of America	Shawnee State University	Portsmouth, Ohio 38°43′49″N 82°59′32″W 9.38 deg/hour 225.24 deg/day				Citations:
United States of America	University of Central Oklahoma	Lawton, Oklahoma 34°36′27″N 98°26′03″W 8.52 deg/hour 204.46 deg/day				UCO's Foucault Pendulum in Howell Hall on YouTube; Citations:
United States of America	University of Oklahoma, Nielsen Hall atrium	Norman, Oklahoma 35°12′26″N 97°26′48″W 8.65 deg/hour 207.55 deg/day				HD: Foucault's Pendulum at the University of Oklahoma on YouTube; Citations:
United States of America	Oregon Convention Center	Portland, Oregon 45°31′45″N 122°39′49″W 10.7 deg/hour 256.9 deg/day	21.0 m (70.0 feet) Period : 9.19 sec	Mass : 340.0 kg (750.0 pound)		Google Streetview; Foucault's Pendulum – Portland, Oregon on YouTube; Citations:
United States of America	PennWest Edinboro	Edinboro, Pennsylvania 41°52′08″N 80°07′28″W 10.01 deg/hour 240.27 deg/day				Citations:
United States of America	Grove City College	Grove City, Pennsylvania 41°09′20″N 80°04′45″W 9.87 deg/hour 236.92 deg/day				Citations:
United States of America	Not Operating; Millersville University	Millersville, Pennsylvania 39°59′57″N 76°21′00″W 9.64 deg/hour 231.4 deg/day				Citations:
United States of America	Franklin Institute	Philadelphia, Pennsylvania 39°57′31″N 75°10′22″W 9.63 deg/hour 231.2 deg/day	27.0 m (85.0 feet) Period : 10.42 sec	Mass : 80.0 kg		Google Streetview; Citations:
United States of America	Children's Museum of Pittsburgh	Pittsburgh, Pennsylvania 40°27′10″N 80°00′23″W 9.73 deg/hour 233.58 deg/day				Facebook; Citations:
United States of America	Clemson University	Clemson, South Carolina 34°40′41″N 82°50′08″W 8.53 deg/hour 204.83 deg/day				Foucault Pendulum on YouTube; Citations:
United States of America	Augustana University	Sioux Falls, South Dakota 43°31′22″N 96°44′15″W 10.33 deg/hour 247.91 deg/day				Citations:
United States of America	Southern Adventist University	Collegedale, Tennessee 35°02′46″N 85°03′10″W 8.61 deg/hour 206.72 deg/day				Google Streetview; Citations:
United States of America	University of Texas at Austin, DEV Building	Austin, Texas 30°17′14″N 97°43′25″W 7.57 deg/hour 181.56 deg/day	12.0 m (40.0 feet) Period : 6.95 sec			Citations:
United States of America	1900 North Akard	Dallas, Texas 32°47′16″N 96°48′09″W 8.12 deg/hour 194.95 deg/day				A Giant Pendulum Is Hiding in Dallas on YouTube; Citations:
United States of America	Houston Museum of Natural Science	Houston, Texas 29°43′20″N 95°23′24″W 7.44 deg/hour 178.49 deg/day				Google Streetview; Citations:
United States of America	Tex Hill Middle School	San Antonio, Texas 29°38′21″N 98°25′05″W 7.42 deg/hour 178.03 deg/day				There are only 6 Foucault pendulums in Texas. Why is one at a San Antonio middle school? on YouTube; Facebook; Citations:
United States of America	Utah Valley University	Orem, Utah 40°16′41″N 111°42′53″W 9.7 deg/hour 232.74 deg/day				The Foucault Pendulum at Utah Valley University on YouTube; Citations:
United States of America	Brigham Young University	Provo, Utah 40°14′50″N 111°39′01″W 9.69 deg/hour 232.59 deg/day				Foucault Pendulum on YouTube; Citations:
United States of America	Clark Planetarium	Salt Lake City, Utah 40°46′00″N 111°54′12″W 9.79 deg/hour 235.07 deg/day				The Foucault Pendulum - Clark Planetarium on YouTube; Foucault Pendulum on YouTube; Citations:
United States of America	University of Richmond	Richmond, Virginia 37°34′27″N 77°32′24″W 9.15 deg/hour 219.52 deg/day				Citations:
United States of America	Science Museum of Virginia	Richmond, Virginia 37°33′40″N 77°27′57″W 9.14 deg/hour 219.46 deg/day				Google Streetview; Science Museum of Virginia – Foucault Pendulum on YouTube; Foucault Pendulum at Richmond Science Museum on YouTube; Citations:
United States of America	Temporary; National Academy of Sciences	Washington, D.C. 38°53′35″N 77°02′52″W 9.42 deg/hour 226.03 deg/day				Installing the Foucault Pendulum at the National Academy of Sciences on YouTube; Citations:
United States of America	Removed; National Museum of American History	Washington, D.C. 38°53′28″N 77°01′48″W 9.42 deg/hour 226.02 deg/day	16.0 m Period : 8.02 sec			Citations:
United States of America	Green River College	Auburn, Washington 47°18′48″N 122°10′43″W 11.03 deg/hour 264.63 deg/day				Foucault Pendulum Green River College on YouTube; Citations:
United States of America	Central Washington University	Ellensburg, Washington 47°00′01″N 120°32′18″W 10.97 deg/hour 263.29 deg/day	11.0 m (36.0 feet) Period : 6.65 sec			Citations:
United States of America	University of Washington	Seattle, Washington (state) 47°39′12″N 122°18′42″W 11.09 deg/hour 266.07 deg/day	15.0 m (50.0 feet) Period : 7.77 sec			Foucault pendulum, University of Washington on YouTube; Citations:
United States of America	University of Puget Sound	Tacoma, Washington 47°15′49″N 122°29′01″W 11.02 deg/hour 264.41 deg/day				Foucault Pendulum at University of Puget Sound on YouTube; Citations:
United States of America	University of Wisconsin–Stevens Point	Stevens Point, Wisconsin 44°31′41″N 89°34′15″W 10.52 deg/hour 252.45 deg/day				Citations:
United States of America	Casper College, Wold Physical Science Center	Casper, Wyoming 42°49′55″N 106°19′30″W 10.2 deg/hour 244.75 deg/day				Citations:
United States of America	Western Wyoming Community College	Rock Springs, Wyoming 41°35′30″N 109°14′16″W 9.96 deg/hour 238.97 deg/day				Citations:

== South America ==
Country	Facility	Location	String	Bob	Image	Notes/Citations
Argentina	University of Buenos Aires, Pavilion 2	Buenos Aires 34°32′34″S 58°26′29″W 8.51 deg/hour 204.13 deg/day	18.0 m Period : 8.51 sec	Mass : 200.0 kg		Google Streetview; Péndulo ubicado en Ciudad Universitaria (UBA) on YouTube; Facebook; Citations:
Argentina	University of Buenos Aires, Museum of Science and Technology	Buenos Aires 34°35′19″S 58°23′47″W 8.52 deg/hour 204.36 deg/day				Citations:
Argentina	Teatro Argentino de La Plata	La Plata 34°55′05″S 57°57′04″W 8.59 deg/hour 206.07 deg/day				Péndulo de Foucault - Teatro Argentino on YouTube; Citations:
Argentina	Plaza Cielo Tierra	Córdoba 31°25′55″S 64°11′07″W 7.82 deg/hour 187.73 deg/day	12.0 m Period : 6.95 sec			Plaza Cielo Tierra, Ciudad de Córdoba. Estación Trip El Docetv on YouTube; Citations:
Brazil	PUCRS Museum of Science and Technology	Porto Alegre, Rio Grande do Sul 30°03′30″S 51°10′34″W 7.51 deg/hour 180.32 deg/day				Citations:
Brazil	Rio de Janeiro State University	Rio de Janeiro 22°54′40″S 43°14′10″W 5.84 deg/hour 140.15 deg/day				Citations:
Brazil	Rio de Janeiro City Planetarium	Rio de Janeiro 22°58′41″S 43°13′49″W 5.86 deg/hour 140.54 deg/day				Citations:
Chile	St. Francis Xavier College, Puerto Montt	Puerto Montt, Los Lagos Region 41°28′13″S 72°56′33″W 9.93 deg/hour 238.4 deg/day	19.5 m Period : 8.86 sec	Mass : 115.0 kg		Instagram; Citations:
Chile	Centro de Estudios Científicos	Valdivia, Los Ríos Region 39°48′51″S 73°14′55″W 9.6 deg/hour 230.51 deg/day	13.0 m Period : 7.23 sec	Mass : 100.0 kg		Google Streetview; Péndulo de Foucault en Valdivia on YouTube; Citations:
Chile	Removed; Chilean National Museum of Natural History	Santiago 33°26′31″S 70°40′54″W 8.27 deg/hour 198.39 deg/day	12.0 m Period : 6.95 sec	Mass : 45.0 kg		Citations:
Chile	University of Chile	Santiago 33°27′28″S 70°39′52″W 8.27 deg/hour 198.48 deg/day	18.0 m Period : 8.51 sec	Mass : 100.0 kg		Péndulo de Foucault - FCFM Universidad de Chile on YouTube; Citations:
Colombia	Geographic Institute Agustín Codazzi	Bogotá 4°38′20″N 74°04′48″W 1.21 deg/hour 29.11 deg/day				La ciencia detrás de: el péndulo de Foucault on YouTube; Citations:
Peru	Museo Histórico de Ciencias Físicas	Lima 12°03′36″S 77°04′54″W 3.13 deg/hour 75.22 deg/day				Citations:
Puerto Rico	University of Puerto Rico at Mayagüez	Mayagüez, Puerto Rico 18°12′39″N 67°08′20″W 4.69 deg/hour 112.51 deg/day				Citations:

== Asia ==
Country	Facility	Location	String	Bob	Image	Notes/Citations
China	Chinese Academy of Sciences	Beijing 39°59′16″N 116°19′46″E 9.64 deg/hour 231.34 deg/day				Citations:
China	Beijing Planetarium	Beijing 39°56′10″N 116°19′52″E 9.63 deg/hour 231.1 deg/day	18.0 m Period : 8.51 sec	Mass : 35.0 kg		Google Streetview; 北京天文館深度講解8 on YouTube; Citations:
China	Guangdong Science Center	Guangzhou, Guangdong 23°02′28″N 113°21′51″E 5.87 deg/hour 140.9 deg/day	10.0 m Period : 6.34 sec			Citations:
China	Henan Science and Technology Museum	Zhengzhou, Henan 34°46′54″N 113°40′53″E 8.56 deg/hour 205.36 deg/day				Citations:
China	Shanghai Astronomy Museum	Shanghai 30°54′52″N 121°55′19″E 7.71 deg/hour 184.95 deg/day	16.0 m Period : 8.02 sec	Mass : 25.0 kg Shape : Ball		上海天文馆傅科摆，摆动平面偏转证实地球的自转运动 on YouTube; Citations:
China	Binhai Science and Technology Museum	Tianjin 39°01′04″N 117°40′54″E 9.44 deg/hour 226.64 deg/day				Citations:
China	China Digital Science and Technology Museum	Kunming, Yunnan 25°04′02″N 102°42′18″E 6.36 deg/hour 152.53 deg/day				Citations:
China	National Time Service Center	34°21′08″N 109°12′47″E 8.46 deg/hour 203.14 deg/day				Citations:
Chine_Hong Kong	Bonham Road Government Primary School	Hong Kong 22°17′04″N 114°08′38″E 5.69 deg/hour 136.51 deg/day				Citations:
Chine_Macao	Wynn Palace	Macau 22°08′51″N 113°34′16″E 5.65 deg/hour 135.72 deg/day		Mass : 106.6 kg (235.0 pound)		Citations:
Democratic People's Republic of Korea	Pyongyang Sci-Tech Complex	Pyongyang 38°59′19″N 125°42′43″E 9.44 deg/hour 226.5 deg/day				Citations:
India	Bodhgaya Science Centre	Bodh Gaya, Bihar 24°41′55″N 84°58′57″E 6.27 deg/hour 150.42 deg/day				Foucault Pendulum on YouTube; Citations:
India	Ranchi Science Centre	Ranchi, Jharkhand 23°24′25″N 85°20′19″E 5.96 deg/hour 143.01 deg/day				Citations:
India	Swami Vivekananda Planetarium	Mangaluru, Karnataka 12°55′30″N 74°53′58″E 3.36 deg/hour 80.52 deg/day				Citations:
India	Inter-University Centre for Astronomy and Astrophysics	Pune, Maharashtra 18°33′33″N 73°49′31″E 4.77 deg/hour 114.58 deg/day				Google Streetview; Citations:
India	Parliament House, New Delhi	New Delhi 28°37′02″N 77°12′36″E 7.18 deg/hour 172.42 deg/day	22.0 m Period : 9.41 sec	Mass : 36.0 kg Shape : Ball		It is located in the Constitution Hall of the Houses of Parliament. It embodies Article 51(h) of the Indian Constitution, which outlines the duties of citizens, namely, "to cultivate a scientific attitude, humanism, inquisitiveness and a spirit of reform.": From Foucault's Pendulum to temple-inspired doors, a look at design & symbols of new Parliament on YouTube; Foucault Pendulum on YouTube; Citations:
India	Subir Raha Oil Museum	Dehradun, Uttarakhand 30°20′15″N 78°01′50″E 7.58 deg/hour 181.83 deg/day				Citations:
India	Saha Institute of Nuclear Physics	Kolkata, West Bengal 22°36′05″N 88°25′15″E 5.76 deg/hour 138.35 deg/day				Citations:
India	Science City, Kolkata	Kolkata, West Bengal 22°32′17″N 88°23′44″E 5.75 deg/hour 137.99 deg/day				Foucault Pendulum in Science City, Kolkata on YouTube; Foucault Pendulum on YouTube; Citations:
Iran	University of Isfahan	Isfahan, Isfahan province 32°36′46″N 51°39′42″E 8.08 deg/hour 194.03 deg/day	3.0 m Period : 3.47 sec			Citations:
Iran	University of Kashan	Kashan, Isfahan province 34°00′45″N 51°21′57″E 8.39 deg/hour 201.37 deg/day	12.0 m Period : 6.95 sec	Mass : 48.0 kg		Citations:
Iran	Sharif University of Technology	Tehran, Tehran province 35°42′07″N 51°21′07″E 8.75 deg/hour 210.08 deg/day	15.0 m Period : 7.77 sec			Citations:
Israel	Ben-Gurion University of the Negev	Beersheba 31°15′46″N 34°48′19″E 7.78 deg/hour 186.83 deg/day				TikTok; Citations:
Israel	Givatayim Observatory	Givatayim 32°04′11″N 34°48′55″E 7.96 deg/hour 191.14 deg/day				Citations:
Israel	Clore Garden of Science	Rehovot 31°54′37″N 34°48′47″E 7.93 deg/hour 190.29 deg/day				מטוטלת פוקו בגן המדע on YouTube; Citations:
Israel	Weizmann Institute of Science	Rehovot 31°54′17″N 34°48′30″E 7.93 deg/hour 190.26 deg/day				Foucault's pendulum in Weizmann Institute of Science on YouTube; Citations:
Japan	Nagoya City Science Museum	Nagoya, Aichi Prefecture 35°09′53″N 136°53′57″E 8.64 deg/hour 207.34 deg/day	27.9 m Period : 10.6 sec	Mass : 81.0 kg Shape : Ball; Size : diameter 27 cm		Google Streetview; フーコーの振り子 名古屋市科学館 Pendule de Foucault on YouTube; Citations:
Japan	Hirosaki University	Hirosaki, Aomori Prefecture 40°35′15″N 140°28′23″E 9.76 deg/hour 234.22 deg/day	45.0 m Period : 13.46 sec	Mass : 49.7 kg Shape : Ball; Size : diameter 23 cm		【2024_d17】フーコーの振り子実験 on YouTube; Citations:
Japan	Makuhari Junior and Senior High School	Chiba (city) 35°39′17″N 140°02′46″E 8.74 deg/hour 209.84 deg/day				渋谷幕張中学校・高等学校 フーコーの振り子 on YouTube; Citations:
Japan	Chiba University	Chiba (city) 35°37′44″N 140°06′14″E 8.74 deg/hour 209.71 deg/day		Shape : Ball		Citations:
Japan	Tokyo DisneySea, Fortress Explorations	Urayasu, Chiba Prefecture 35°37′32″N 139°53′07″E 8.74 deg/hour 209.7 deg/day		Mass : 106.6 kg (235.0 pound); Shape : Ball; Size : diameter 38 cm Material : Brass		Citations:
Japan	Kyushu University	Fukuoka 33°35′46″N 130°13′08″E 8.3 deg/hour 199.2 deg/day	40.6 m Period : 12.78 sec	Mass : 52.0 kg Shape : Cylinder; Size : diameter 20 cm Material : Brass		Instagram; Citations:
Japan	Koriyama Women's University	Kōriyama, Fukushima Prefecture 37°23′47″N 140°21′06″E 9.11 deg/hour 218.64 deg/day	19.7 m Period : 8.9 sec	Mass : 60.0 kg Shape : Ball		郡山女子大学 ネーチャードーム フーコーの振り子 on YouTube; Citations:
Japan	Nayoro City Kitaguni Museum	Nayoro, Hokkaido 44°20′30″N 142°28′03″E 10.48 deg/hour 251.62 deg/day	13.0 m Period : 7.23 sec	Mass : 50.0 kg Shape : Ball		Google Streetview; フーコーの振り子 on YouTube; Citations:
Japan	Sapporo Science Center	Sapporo, Hokkaido 43°02′10″N 141°28′20″E 10.24 deg/hour 245.69 deg/day	10.0 m Period : 6.34 sec	Mass : 33.0 kg Shape : Ball		Google Streetview; Citations:
Japan	Not Operating; Dojiyama Park	Nishiwaki, Hyōgo 34°59′25″N 134°58′15″E 8.6 deg/hour 206.44 deg/day	21.0 m Period : 9.19 sec	Mass : 30.0 kg		This pendulum is relocated that was exhibited at the Portopia '81.: 西脇ふりこフェスティバル(2011.04.24) on YouTube; Citations:
Japan	Himeji City Science Museum	Himeji, Hyōgo Prefecture 34°51′06″N 134°37′37″E 8.57 deg/hour 205.72 deg/day	15.0 m Period : 7.77 sec	Mass : 106.6 kg (235.0 pound); Shape : Ball; Size : diameter 38 cm Material : Brass		姫路市施設紹介「姫路科学館」 on YouTube; Citations:
Japan	Kobe Science Museum	Kobe, Hyōgo Prefecture 34°39′58″N 135°13′07″E 8.53 deg/hour 204.76 deg/day	8.0 m Period : 5.67 sec	Mass : 30.0 kg		Google Streetview; Facebook; Citations:
Japan	Ibaraki University	Hitachi, Ibaraki 36°34′22″N 140°38′35″E 8.94 deg/hour 214.5 deg/day		Shape : Ball		Citations:
Japan	Morioka Children's Science Museum	Morioka, Iwate Prefecture 39°41′39″N 141°07′47″E 9.58 deg/hour 229.93 deg/day	8.0 m Period : 5.67 sec	Shape : Ball		フーコーの振子 on YouTube; Citations:
Japan	Kagoshima City Science Museum	Kagoshima, Kagoshima Prefecture 31°33′48″N 130°33′16″E 7.85 deg/hour 188.44 deg/day	14.0 m Period : 7.51 sec	Mass : 16.0 kg Shape : Ball		Citations:
Japan	Sony, Atsugi Technology Center Two	Atsugi, Kanagawa Prefecture 35°25′41″N 139°22′13″E 8.7 deg/hour 208.68 deg/day	30.0 m Period : 10.99 sec	Mass : 75.0 kg		フーコーの振り子 @ 厚木第2TEC on YouTube; Citations:
Japan	Jishukan Secondary Education School	Isehara, Kanagawa 35°24′19″N 139°20′27″E 8.69 deg/hour 208.57 deg/day		Shape : Ball		Citations:
Japan	Keio Senior High School	Yokohama 35°33′05″N 139°38′59″E 8.72 deg/hour 209.32 deg/day	14.9 m Period : 7.74 sec	Mass : 44.0 kg Shape : Ball		Citations:
Japan	Yokohama Municipal Minami High School and Junior High School	Yokohama 35°24′19″N 139°34′47″E 8.69 deg/hour 208.57 deg/day	21.4 m Period : 9.28 sec	Mass : 35.0 kg Shape : Cylinder		Citations:
Japan	Kyoto City Youth Science Center	Kyoto, Kyoto Prefecture 34°57′20″N 135°46′00″E 8.59 deg/hour 206.26 deg/day	7.2 m Period : 5.38 sec	Shape : Ball		Citations:
Japan	Not Operating; Fukusai-ji	Nagasaki 32°45′13″N 129°52′29″E 8.12 deg/hour 194.77 deg/day	25.1 m Period : 10.05 sec	Mass : 32.0 kg Shape : Ball		Citations:
Japan	Kashihara City Children's Science Museum	Kashihara, Nara 34°30′02″N 135°47′47″E 8.5 deg/hour 203.91 deg/day	13.0 m Period : 7.23 sec	Mass : 35.0 kg Shape : Ball		Citations:
Japan	Niigata Prefectural Museum of Natural Science	Niigata (city) 37°53′26″N 139°02′59″E 9.21 deg/hour 221.1 deg/day	12.5 m Period : 7.09 sec	Mass : 38.0 kg Shape : Ball		Citations:
Japan	Yodo Junior High School,Osaka Municipal	Osaka, Osaka Prefecture 34°43′20″N 135°31′13″E 8.54 deg/hour 205.05 deg/day	7.2 m Period : 5.38 sec			It was donated by the family of a student who died in the Japan Airlines Flight 123 Crash. Citations:
Japan	University of Osaka	Toyonaka, Osaka Prefecture 34°48′08″N 135°27′18″E 8.56 deg/hour 205.47 deg/day	7.0 m Period : 5.31 sec	Mass : 32.0 kg		フーコーの振り子（大阪大学理学部棟） on YouTube; Citations:
Japan	Saitama Municipal Youth Astronomical Museum	Saitama (city) 35°52′21″N 139°39′52″E 8.79 deg/hour 210.95 deg/day	7.0 m Period : 5.31 sec	Shape : Ball		Citations:
Japan	Not Operating; Ogi Nishi Park	Ōtsu, Shiga Prefecture 35°06′09″N 135°53′23″E 8.63 deg/hour 207.02 deg/day	7.5 m Period : 5.49 sec	Mass : 57.0 kg		Google Streetview; Citations:
Japan	Tokushima Science Museum	Itano, Tokushima, Tokushima Prefecture 34°09′14″N 134°26′33″E 8.42 deg/hour 202.11 deg/day	10.0 m Period : 6.34 sec	Mass : 10.0 kg		Google Streetview; 【常設展示場】「フーコーの振り子」を解説 on YouTube; Citations:
Japan	Katsushika City Museum	Katsushika, Tokyo 35°45′10″N 139°50′36″E 8.76 deg/hour 210.34 deg/day	14.0 m Period : 7.51 sec	Mass : 106.6 kg (235.0 pound); Shape : Ball; Size : diameter 38 cm Material : Brass		フーコーの振り子 微速度撮影 on YouTube; Citations:
Japan	Musashi High School and Junior High School	Nerima, Tokyo 35°44′12″N 139°40′02″E 8.76 deg/hour 210.26 deg/day	15.97 m Period : 8.02 sec	Shape : Ball		Citations:
Japan	National Museum of Nature and Science	Taitō, Tokyo 35°42′59″N 139°46′35″E 8.76 deg/hour 210.16 deg/day	19.5 m Period : 8.86 sec	Mass : 49.6 kg Shape : Ball; Size : diameter 23 cm Material : Stainless Steel		Foucault's pendulum was the first permanent exhibit in Japan in 1934.: 日本館B1F「フーコーの振り子」動画 on YouTube; Citations:
Japan	Temporary; National Institute of Information and Communications Technology	Koganei, Tokyo 35°42′30″N 139°29′18″E 8.75 deg/hour 210.12 deg/day	17.0 m Period : 8.27 sec	Mass : 32.0 kg Shape : Bicone		フーコーの振り子を夜間13時間連続撮影、200倍速て再生 on YouTube; Citations:
Japan	Tokyo Gakugei University	Koganei, Tokyo 35°42′19″N 139°29′26″E 8.75 deg/hour 210.1 deg/day	15.0 m Period : 7.77 sec	Shape : Ball		Citations:
Japan	Yamagata Prefectural Industrial Science Museum	Yamagata (city) 38°14′59″N 140°19′35″E 9.29 deg/hour 222.87 deg/day	20.0 m Period : 8.97 sec	Mass : 32.0 kg Shape : Ball		Google Streetview; 「フーコーの振り子」 山形県産業科学館 on YouTube; Citations:
Japan	Yamanashi Prefectural Science Museum	Kōfu, Yamanashi Prefecture 35°40′09″N 138°34′49″E 8.75 deg/hour 209.92 deg/day	14.0 m Period : 7.51 sec	Mass : 30.0 kg Shape : Ball		Citations:
Korea	Pukyong National University	Busan 35°07′59″N 129°06′10″E 8.63 deg/hour 207.17 deg/day	17.8 m Period : 8.46 sec	Mass : 69.0 kg Shape : Ball		Citations:
Korea	Incheon Student Science Museum	Incheon 37°33′06″N 126°44′23″E 9.14 deg/hour 219.41 deg/day				Citations:
Korea	Gyeongbuk Science Education Institute	Pohang, North Gyeongsang Province 36°02′47″N 129°21′12″E 8.83 deg/hour 211.84 deg/day				푸코진자 on YouTube; Citations:
Korea	Gimhae Astronomical Observatory	Gimhae, South Gyeongsang Province 35°15′11″N 128°53′14″E 8.66 deg/hour 207.79 deg/day				Citations:
Korea	Gyeongsangnam-do Science Education Institute	Jinju, South Gyeongsang Province 35°12′05″N 128°13′33″E 8.65 deg/hour 207.52 deg/day	8.8 m Period : 5.95 sec	Mass : 40.0 kg Shape : Ball		푸코진자 운동 on YouTube; Citations:
Kuwait	Kuwait Foundation for the Advancement of Sciences	Kuwait City 29°22′40″N 47°58′44″E 7.36 deg/hour 176.6 deg/day	30.5 m Period : 11.08 sec	Mass : 106.6 kg (235.0 pound)		Google Streetview; Pendulum at Kuwait Foundation Advancement Sciences on YouTube; Citations:
Pakistan	National Museum of Science and Technology (Pakistan)	Lahore, Punjab, Pakistan 31°34′36″N 74°21′12″E 7.85 deg/hour 188.51 deg/day				Pendulum (پینڈولم) science museum on YouTube; Citations:
Thailand	Sirindhorn AstroPark	Chiang Mai province 18°51′11″N 98°57′28″E 4.85 deg/hour 116.33 deg/day				Google Streetview; นิทรรศการฟูโกเพนดูลัม l FOUCAULT PENDULUM on YouTube; Citations:
Turkey	Bilkent University	Çankaya District, Ankara Province 39°52′03″N 32°44′53″E 9.62 deg/hour 230.77 deg/day	14.0 m Period : 7.51 sec	Mass : 80.0 kg		Dünyanın döndüğünü kanıtlayan ilk buluş FOUCAULT SARKACI on YouTube; Facebook; Citations:
Turkey	Isparta Ethnography Carpet and Rug Museum	Isparta, Isparta Province 37°45′18″N 30°33′03″E 9.18 deg/hour 220.42 deg/day				Citations:
Turkey	Ege University	Buca, İzmir Province 38°23′58″N 27°16′37″E 9.32 deg/hour 223.61 deg/day				İzmir'deki gözlemevi, Türkiye'nin en büyük gök taşına ev sahipliği yapıyor on YouTube; Citations:

== Oceania, Antarctic ==
Country	Facility	Location	String	Bob	Image	Notes/Citations
Antarctica	Experiment; Amundsen–Scott South Pole Station	90°00′00″S 0°00′00″E 15 deg/hour 360 deg/day	33.0 m Period : 11.52 sec	Mass : 25.0 kg		The pendulum was tested by Michael Town, John Bird, and Alan Baker Winter in wintter 2001. In 1984 Russian physicist Vladimir Braginsky proposed building such a pendulum at the South Pole to detect the Lense–Thirring precession. Citations:
Australia	University of New South Wales	Kensington, New South Wales 33°55′06″S 151°13′46″E 8.37 deg/hour 200.88 deg/day				Citations:
Australia	Rosebank College	Sydney 33°52′13″S 151°07′16″E 8.36 deg/hour 200.63 deg/day				Facebook; Citations:
Australia	Removed; University of Tasmania	Sandy Bay, Tasmania 42°54′12″S 147°19′41″E 10.21 deg/hour 245.07 deg/day				Citations:
Australia	Monash University	Clayton, Victoria 37°54′33″S 145°07′51″E 9.22 deg/hour 221.19 deg/day				Monash University Foucault Pendulum on YouTube; Citations:
Australia	University of Melbourne	Melbourne 37°47′50″S 144°57′55″E 9.19 deg/hour 220.63 deg/day	13.9 m Period : 7.48 sec	Mass : 19.5 kg		Citations:
Australia	Gravity Discovery Centre	Western Australia 31°21′21″S 115°42′45″E 7.81 deg/hour 187.33 deg/day				Citations:
Australia	Wesley College, Perth	City of South Perth, Western Australia 31°58′46″S 115°51′55″E 7.94 deg/hour 190.66 deg/day				Citations:
New Zealand	Tūhura Otago Museum	Dunedin 45°51′56″S 170°30′39″E 10.77 deg/hour 258.38 deg/day				Citations:

== General Sources ==
=== Books ===
- Baker, Gregory L. (2005). The Pendulum: A Case Study in Physics. Oxford University Press. ISBN 0198567545.
- Crease, Robert P. (2004). The Prism and the Pendulum: The Ten Most Beautiful Experiments in Science. ISBN 978-0812970623.

=== Web ===
- "Academy Pendulum Sales（Academy Pendulums）". Archived from the original on 24 February 2025.
- "Foucault-féle ingakísérletek Szombathelyen 1880–2014" (PDF).
- "Entierra Gobierno el proyecto educativo del Centro de Ciencias; será museo".
- "Yale Peabody Museum:Facebook".
- "Pendule Foucault în România și Republica Moldov" (pdf).
- "展示装置納入実績（木下製作所）". Archived from the original on 24 August 2019.
