= Manchester Conference Centre =

Hotel and conference venue in Manchester, England

Coordinates: 53°28′26.5″N 2°14′05.0″W

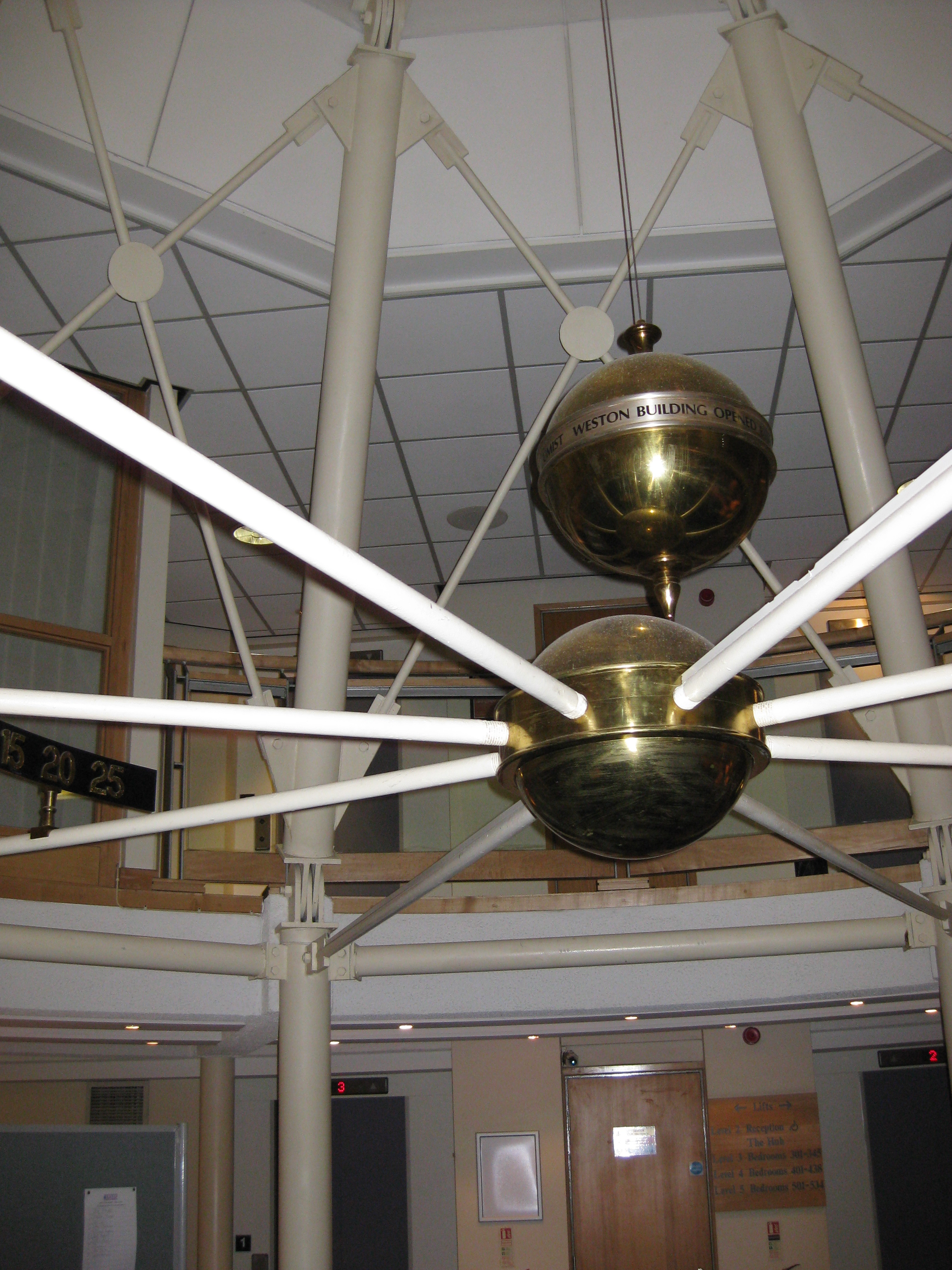
Foucault Pendulum in the Weston Building

The Manchester Conference Centre is a conference centre in Manchester, England, that used to be owned and managed by the Opal Property Group, which has several locations, distributed over the campuses of Manchester University. As the Weston Building it was originally built, owned and operated by UMIST.

When the Weston Building was built in 1992, British universities had already become established in the conference market, providing large-scale facilities for conferences during university vacations, and bringing in cash to help bridge the funding gap. (The building also contained a hall of residence.) The Manchester Conference Centre was built to appeal to the corporate market; the architecture is modern. The Sackville complex was built in 1991. The lower foyer features a pendulum reminiscent of a Foucault pendulum, but in fact it is not a real Foucault pendulum as it doesn't precess. Instead, once the pendulum is set swinging in a particular direction, it continues to swing in that direction without deviation, despite the Earth's rotation. The reason for that is unclear. As is common for such pendulums, it is pushed by an electro-magnet — embedded in the static sphere at the base — to keep it swinging.

The Manchester Conference Centre's 117-bedroom hotel was rebranded in 2014 to The Pendulum Hotel.

== See also ==
- Manchester Central (Conference Centre) Complex consisting of two venues formerly known as the GMEX Centre and Manchester International Conference Centre (MICC))
- List of Foucault pendulums
- Chancellors Hotel & Conference Centre: in use 1997 to 2019
