= PUCRS Museum of Science and Technology =

Museum in Rio Grande do Sul, Brazil

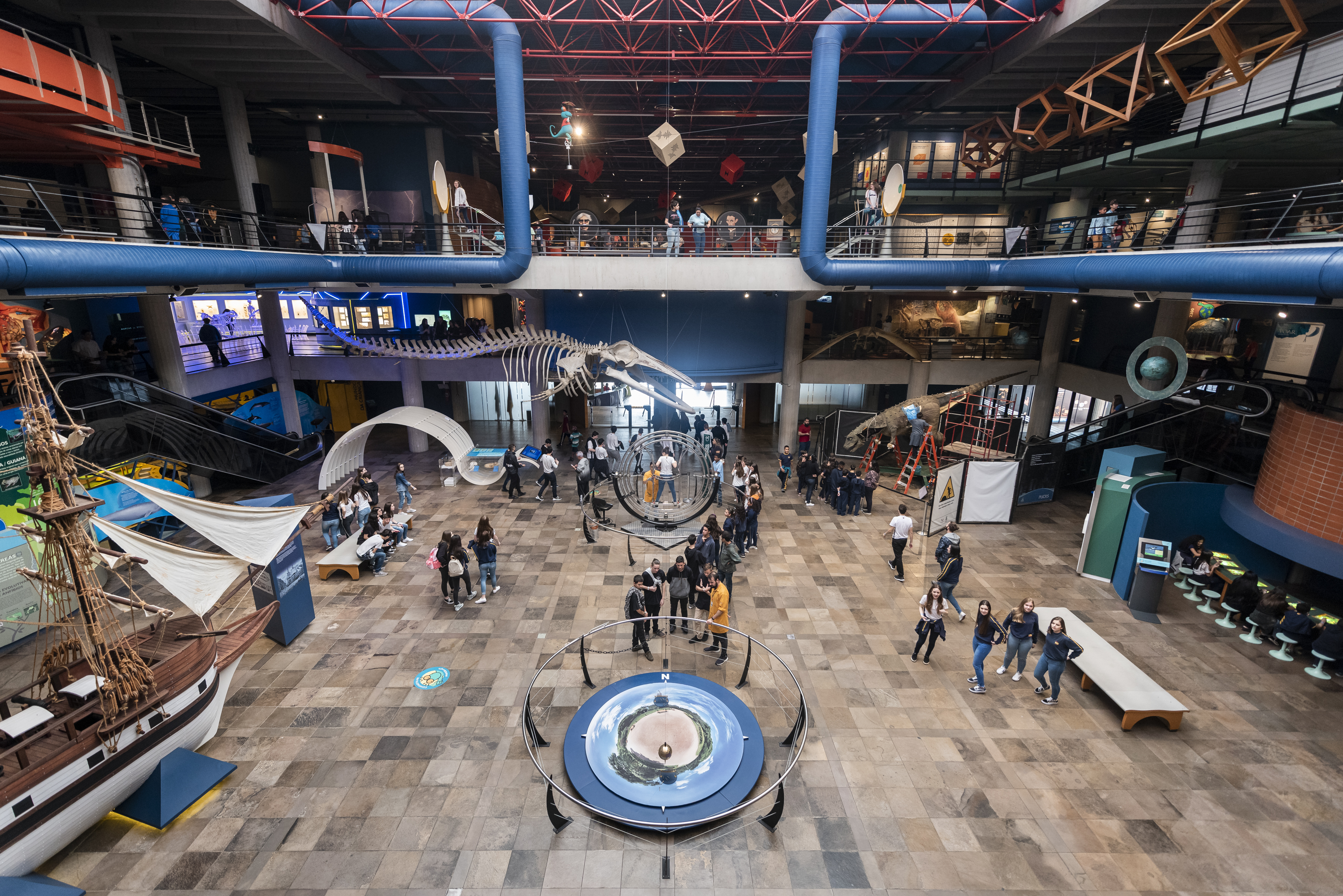
- Established: December 9, 1998
- Location: Avenida Ipiranga, 6681. Porto Alegre, Rio Grande do Sul, Brazil
- Coordinates: 30°03′30″S 51°10′34″W
- Type: Paleontology, Natural history museum, science, Technology.
- Website: www.pucrs.br/mct

The PUCRS Museum of Science and Technology is a Brazilian museum run by the Pontifical Catholic University of Rio Grande do Sul (PUCRS), located in the city of Porto Alegre in Rio Grande do Sul, at Ipiranga Av. 6681, Building 40, Parthenon. Visiting hours are from 9 am to 5 pm Tuesday to Friday and 10 am to 6 pm during the weekend.

== Overview ==
The museum was inaugurated on December 9, 1998. It is the only interactive museum of natural sciences in Latin America and one of the best in the world, offering activities for people of all ages and showcasing attractions divided per area - universe, Earth, environment and man.

The permanent exhibition area of the public has about 700 interactive experiments, covering many areas of knowledge. The visitor can even actively participate in experiments that resulted in the current scientific knowledge.

The permanent collection includes several million pieces and presents one of the best displays of natural sciences from around the country. These include parts of paleontological geopark of paleorrota, a major exhibition of birds and stuffed animals and mineral resources in Brazilians, some with thousands of samples.

== See also ==
- Paleorrota Geopark
- List of Foucault pendulums
