= Liceo Scientifico Statale "Angelo Messedaglia" =

Coordinates: 45.4342°N 10.9944°E

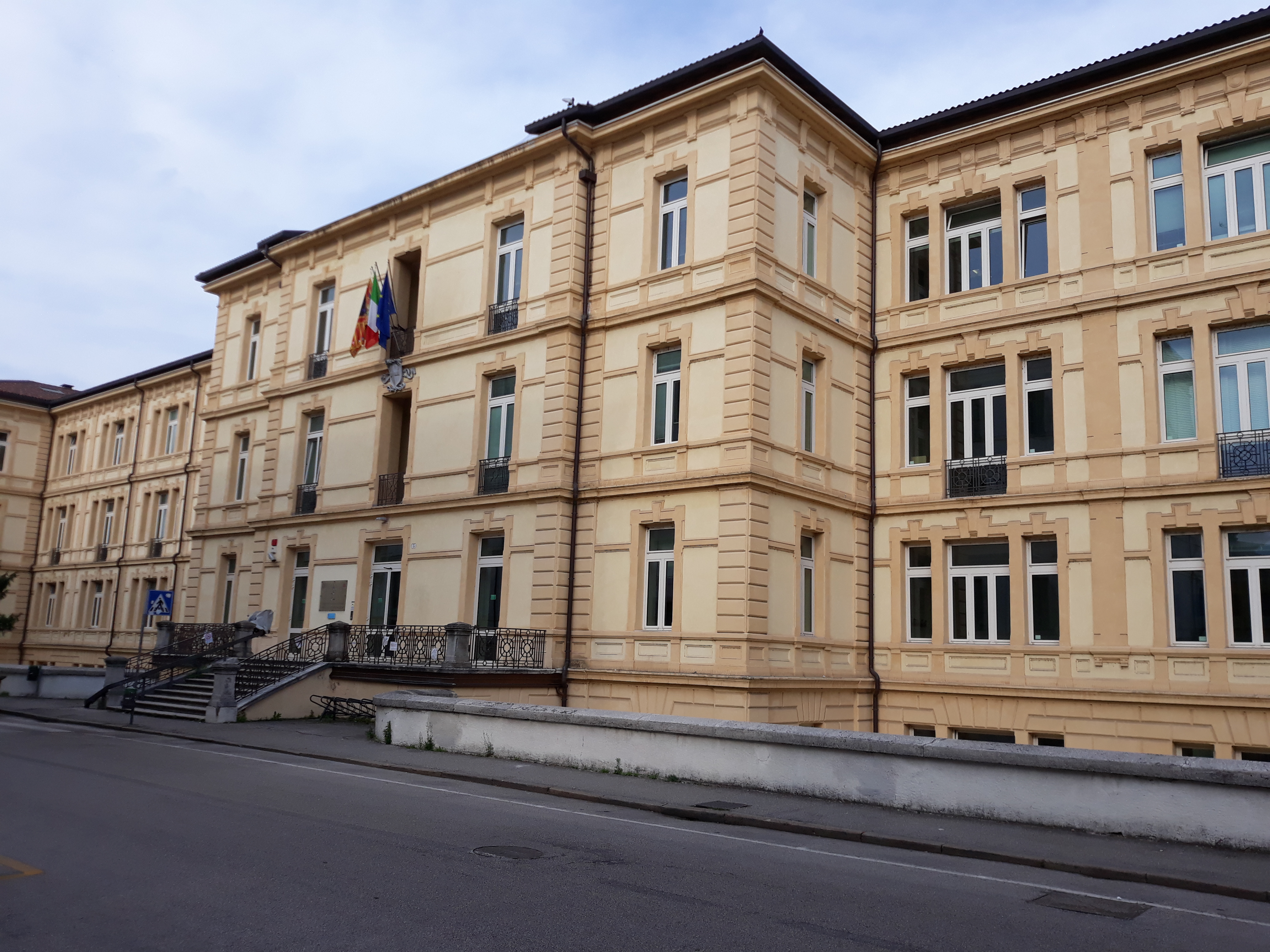
Istituto Messedaglia

Istituto Messedaglia, officially called "Liceo Scientifico Angelo Messedaglia", is one of the oldest schools in Verona, Veneto, North Italy. It is a scientific school, with students who focus on the scientific subjects and can choose different paths: traditional, PNI (Piano Nazionale Informatico, which is Information Technology) or languages.
