= Culler Hall (Miami University) =

Academic building in Ohio, United States

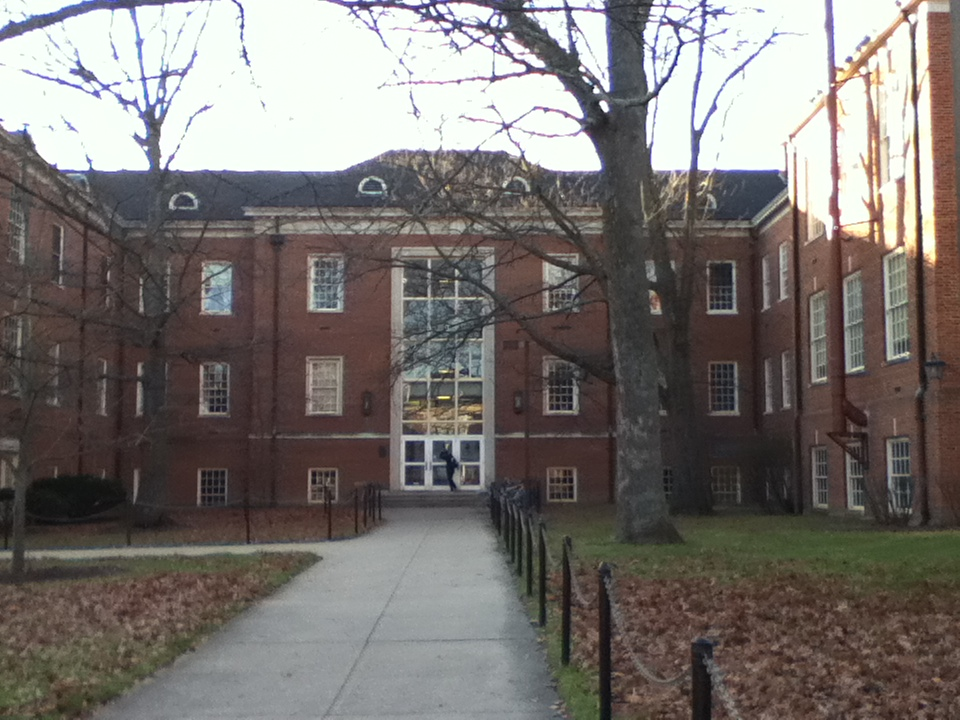
- Front of former Culler Hall

- Location within Ohio

General information
- Type: Academic Building
- Architectural style: Neoclassical Revival
- Location: Oxford, Ohio, United States
- Coordinates: 39°30′27.57″N 84°43′56.94″W
- Current tenants: Physics, Mathematics, and Aeronautics Departments
- Construction started: 1959 (Dedicated Sunday, January 29, 1961)
- Cost: $1,304,000 US
- Client: Miami University
- Owner: Miami University

Dimensions
- Other dimensions: 939,521 cubic ft

Technical details
- Structural system: U-shaped
- Floor count: 2 (and a basement)
- Floor area: 56,070 sq ft

Design and construction
- Architects: Cellarius and Hilmer
- Main contractor: Frank Messer & Sons

Culler Hall was a classroom building at Miami University in Oxford, Ohio. Its construction was completed in 1961. With the dedication of Culler Hall on Sunday, January 29, 1961, John B. Whitlock (Chairman of Building and Grounds Committee for the board of trustees) presented Culler Hall as a new building with classrooms and laboratories dedicated to the study of mathematics, physics, and aeronautics. Built from 1959 to 1961, Culler Hall construction warranted the cutting down of around 60 trees (many of which were very old and found to be dying from within upon removal). The clearing of these trees led to the creation of the protected Bishop Woods. In October 1957, then president of Miami University, Dr. John D. Millett, contacted architects from Cellarius and Hilmer Architects to estimate the cost of adding air-conditioning into Culler Hall during its creation. This warranted 8 inches more for each floor, creating a necessary amount of about $43,000 more for the project. The center of the U-shaped structure had an impressive glass front entrance showing off the Foucault Pendulum within.

Culler Hall was renovated on the inside with its shell largely unchanged when it was converted into the east wing of the Armstrong Student Center within Phase 2 of construction.

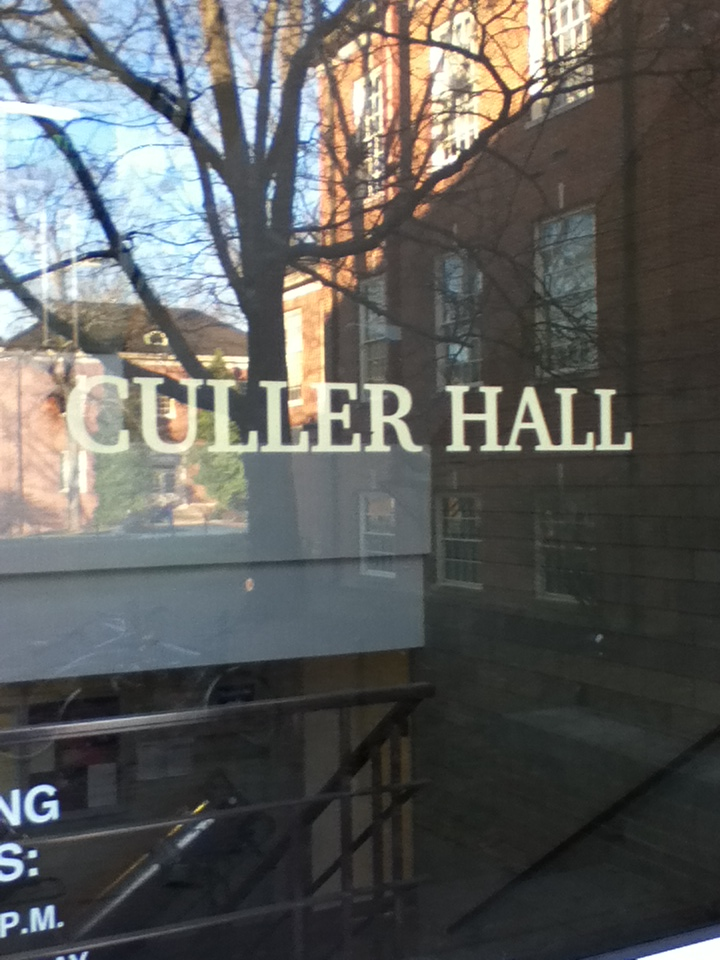
Culler Hall name plate on front door

== Joseph Albertus Culler ==
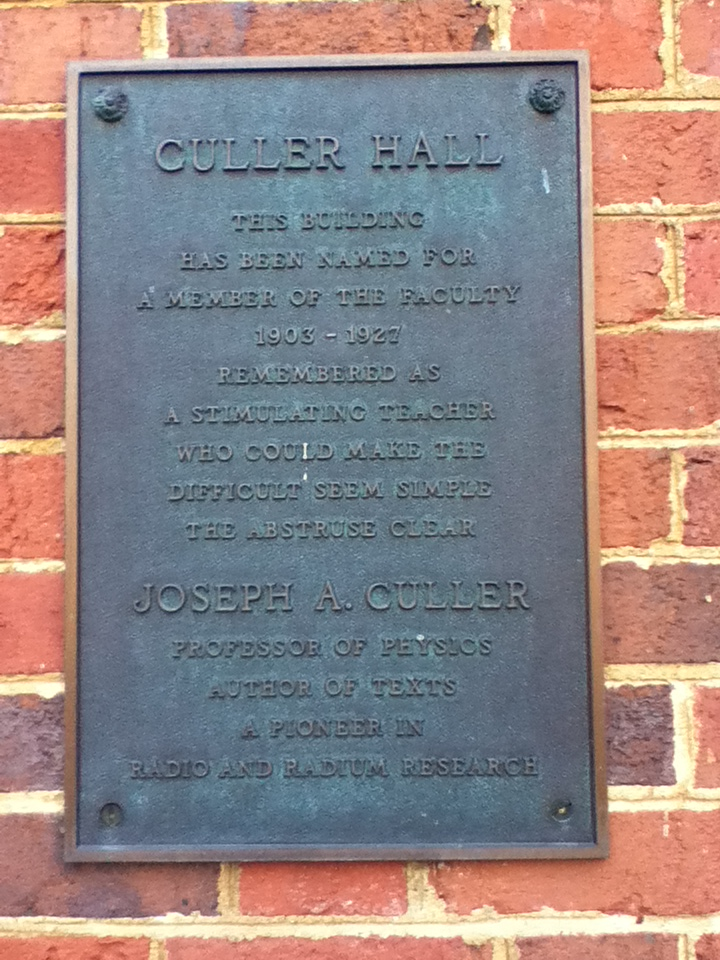
Culler Hall dedication plaque

Culler Hall was named after the first professor of physics in the history of Miami University, Dr. Joseph Albertus Culler. Culler taught physics at Miami University from 1903 to 1927. An oval plaque in front of Culler Hall's main doors honors Joseph A. Culler. The plaque was fashioned in the same manner as the one for another, Miami University academic building, Harrison Hall, which was built one year earlier.

=== Personal life ===
Culler was born on a farm in Wayne County, Ohio, on March 5, 1858, to Michael and Barbara Culler. In 1887 he married Isabella Carnes. He lived in Oxford, OH, from 1903 until his death in 1937. He was a Presbyterian and a Republican.

=== Career ===
He received his A.B. degree from Wooster University in 1884, later returning to Wooster to receive his A.M. and Ph.D. in 1890. Culler worked as a high school principal in Cambridge, Ohio, from 1884 to 1885 before transferring to Kenton, Ohio, from 1885 to 1900. Culler became superintendent of schools in Kenton, Ohio, from 1900 to 1902, and in Bowling Green, Ohio, from 1902 to 1903. In 1903 he joined the faculty at Miami University. Culler was the first person to hold a Miami professorship in physics after it became distinct from the other sciences in the curriculum.

Culler was also the author of several books, including: 1st, 2nd, and 3rd editions of Book of Physiology (1904), First Book in Physics (1905), High School Book of Physics (1906), General Physics for Colleges, Mechanics and Heat (1909), Electricity, Electromagnetic Waves and Sounds (1913), and Physics for College Freshman (1922). Culler is noted for his passion and research into radio and radium, publishing and conducting several experiments on the matter.

Culler died on May 18, 1937, from cumulative radium burns sustained during his extensive research of radium conducted both before and after his retirement from Miami University. The cause of his death led many to consider him as a “martyr to his science.”

== Notable features ==
=== Foucault pendulum ===
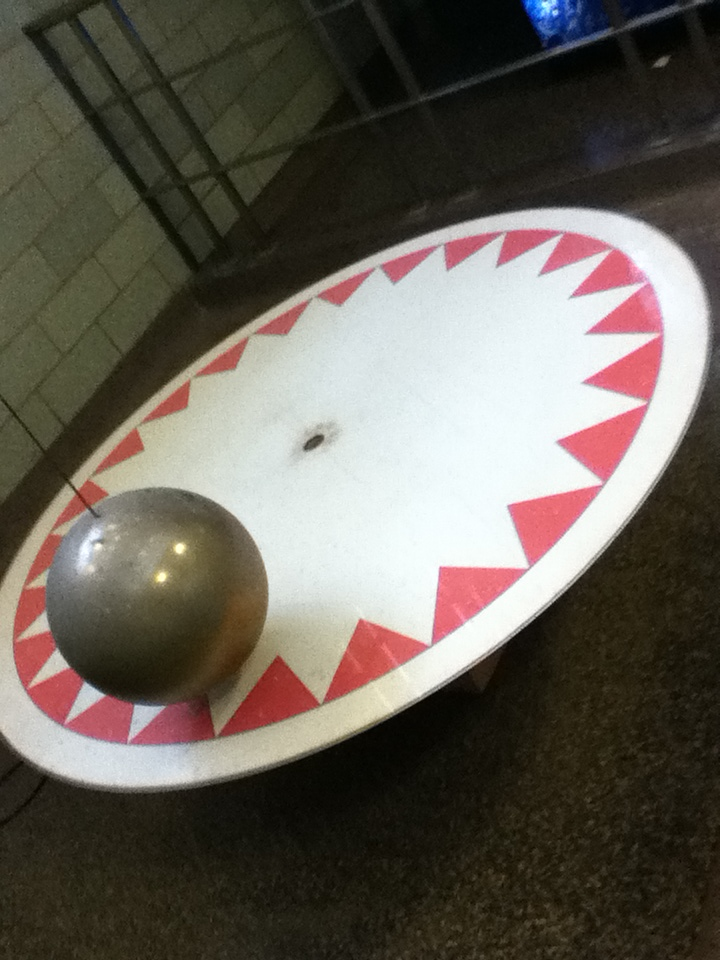
View of Culler Hall's Foucault Pendulum From Ground Floor

Culler Hall showcases a Foucault pendulum similar to those in the United Nations’ building and the Smithsonian Institution. The solid iron ball (with an electroplated gold surface) is known as the bob of the pendulum. Hanging at the end of the rigid, 43 foot aircraft control cable, the ball is ten inches in diameter and weighs a shocking 160 pounds. The sunburst pattern depicted on the floor helps one notice the minute counter-clockwise rotation of the pendulum as the earth rotates daily.

A new pendulum was installed in 2015 in Kreger Hall, where Miami's physics department is housed.

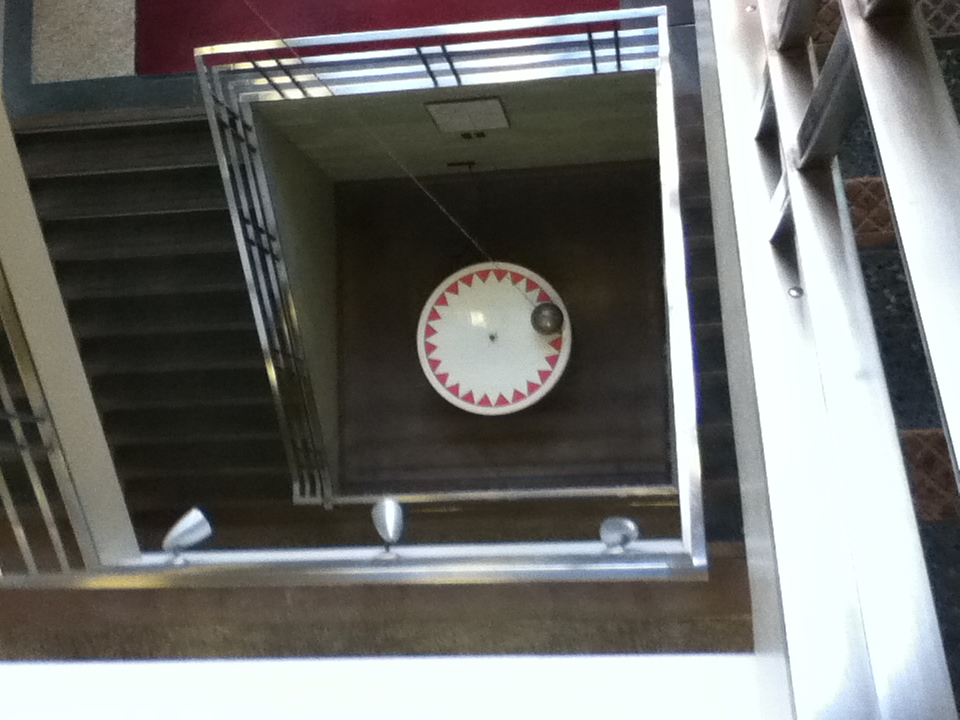
View of Culler Hall's Foucault Pendulum From Above

=== Rooftop astronomical observatory ===
On February 13, 1998, the Miami University Remote Astronomy Laboratory (MURAL) found a home on the newly renovated rooftop of Culler Hall. The laboratory includes an observatory dome. A $15,000 US gift from two Miami Alums Carol and Hall Crannell combined with a $14,000 US grant from the 1996 Learning Technologies Enrichment Program funded the construction of this observatory. Professors from the physics department (Stephan Alexander, Paul DeVries, and Douglas Marcum) set up the observatory with assistance from Miami students from Astronomy Club.

== Future ==
With the creation of the Armstrong Student Center, Culler Hall was renovated and included into this new project. As part of Phase 2 of the student center's construction, the physics department moved into the renovated Kreger Hall. Renovation of Culler Hall was the last step in the process of fusing the current Rowan Hall, Gaskill Hall, and Culler Hall into the Armstrong Student Center after it was decided that the Shriver Center, the student center built 50 years ago when the student population of Miami University was about one third of its current size, had become too small to fulfill all of the universities' needs for a student center functionality.
