= Science Center of Iowa =

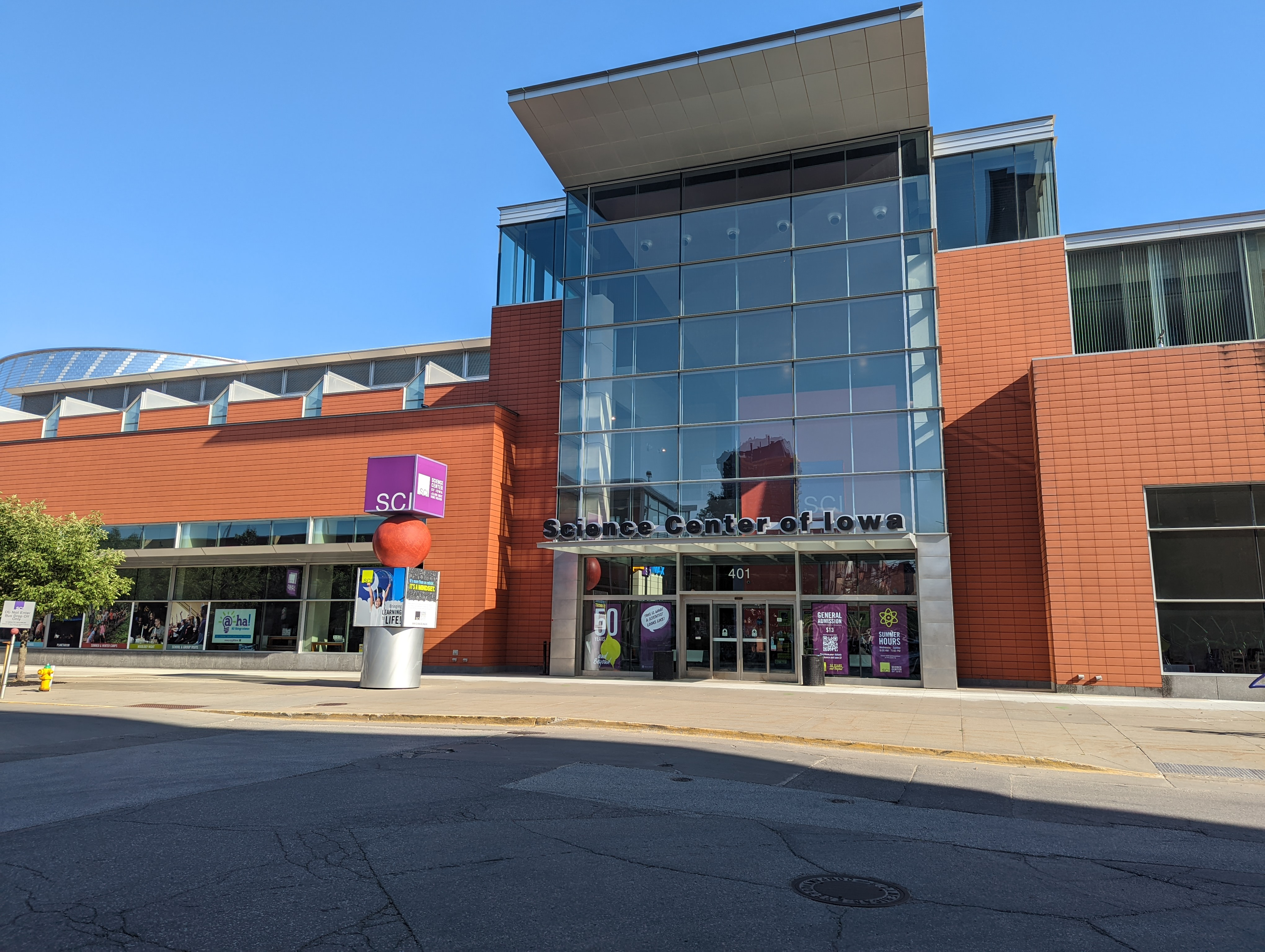
- The main entrance to the Science Center of Iowa

- Location within Iowa
- Location: 401 W Martin Luther King Jr. Parkway; Des Moines, Iowa
- Coordinates: 41.5826°N 93.6219°W
- Website: https://www.sciowa.org/

The Science Center of Iowa is a science museum located in Des Moines, Iowa.

The museum opened in 1970 in Greenwood-Ashworth Park and was called the Des Moines Center of Science and Industry. It was renamed the Science Center of Iowa in 1985. It moved to its current location in 2005.

== Origins ==
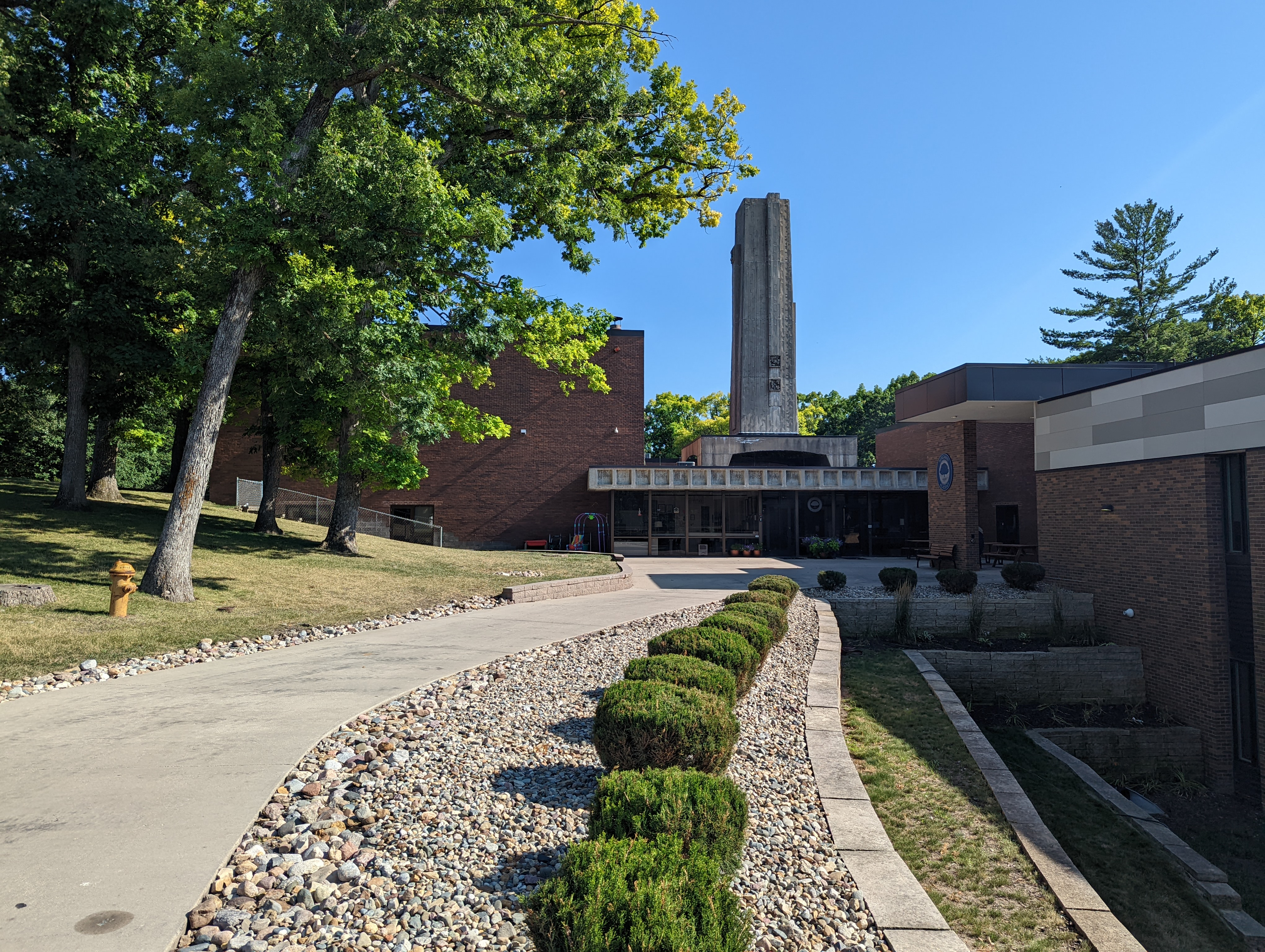
The building that originally housed the Des Moines Center of Science and Industry, when it was located within Greenwood-Ashworth Park. The narrow tower housed the wire supporting the Foucault pendulum.

The construction of the Des Moines Center of Science and Industry was initially sponsored by the Junior League of Des Moines. The first location seriously considered was Union Park, a park in the East side of Des Moines on the Des Moines River. In 1965, fund raising began in earnest, with an anonymous $100,000 donation and $30,000 from the Junior League. In 1969, the Des Moines City Council proposed, and the Des Moines Park Board unanimously approved, constructing the museum on a 4.5-acre tract within Greenwood-Ashworth Park (the park in which the Des Moines Art Center was also located). The proposed cost was $900,000.

The Junior League donated an additional $10,000 for the construction of a Foucault pendulum, suspended on a 65 foot long wire.

The museum contained the Sargent Planetarium, which could seat 135 people under a 40-foot dome. An image of the night sky was projected by a $27,000 Spitz A4 projector. The full cost of the planetarium was $50,000.

The museum's first director was Robert Bridigum, the planetarium's first director was Herb Schwartz, and Bill Synhorst was the first exhibit director.

In 2005, the Science Center moved to a new downtown location.

== Exhibits at the Greenwood-Ashworth Park location ==
Among the museum's earliest exhibits was a 5-foot 8-inch tall Transparent Anatomical Mannequin.

A Challenger Learning Center spaceflight simulator was opened in April 1992.

In "The Den" small live animals (fish, snakes, etc.) native to Iowa were displayed.

== Exhibits ==
A new LEGO-based exhibit opened in September 2018.

The Science Center's planetarium has a 50-foot display. The IMAX theater closed in 2018 due to storm damage. On August 24, 2022 Curt Simmons, the president of the Science Center, announced that the IMAX theater would not be re-opened, and the space would be repurposed for other exhibits.
