= San Giovanni in Foro, Verona =

Church building in Verona, Italy

Coordinates: 45°26′34.81″N 10°59′43.09″E

Church of San Giovanni in Foro
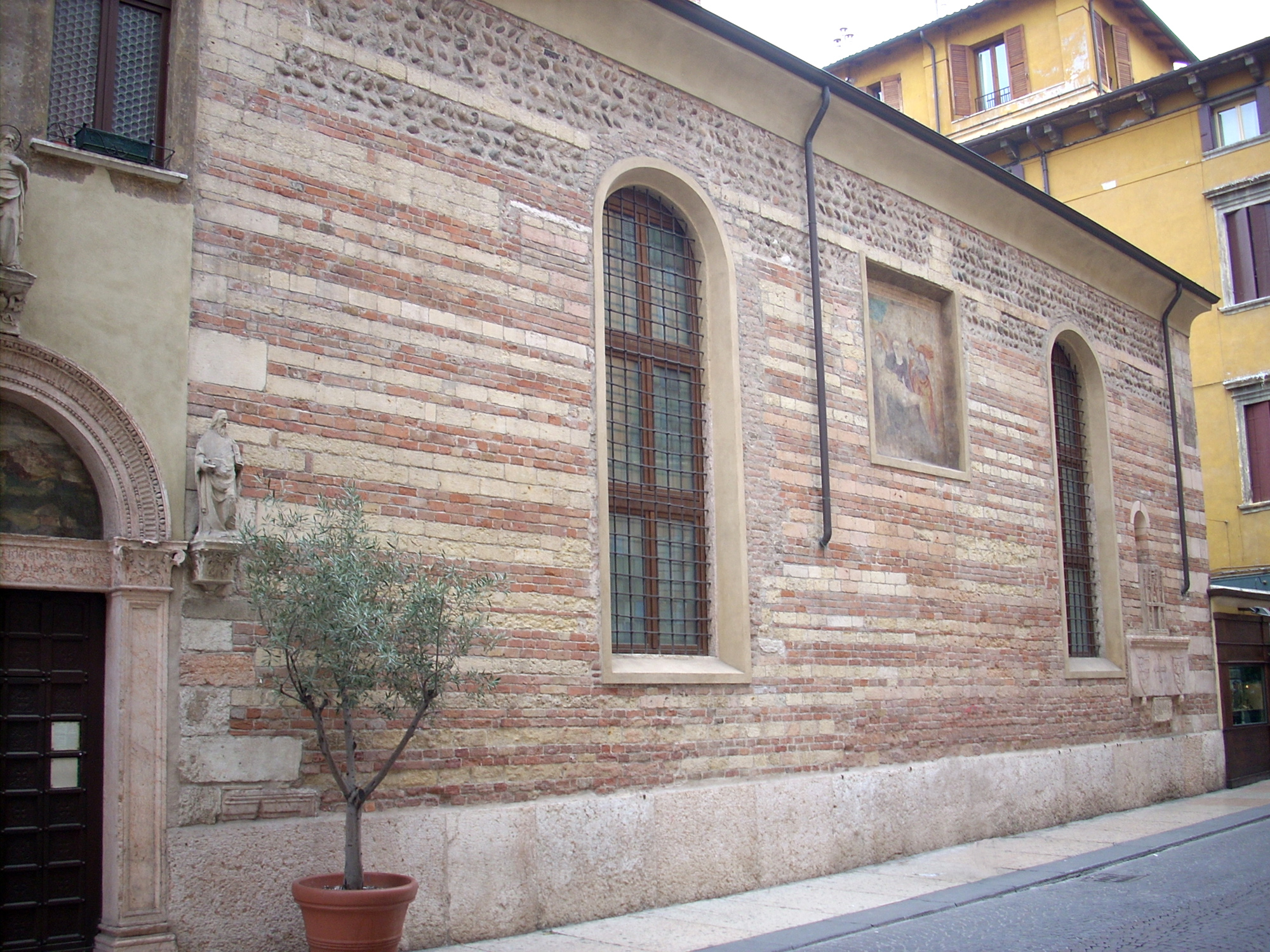

Religion
- Affiliation: Roman Catholic

Location
- Location: Verona, Italy
- Interactive map of Church of San Giovanni in Foro

Architecture
- Type: Church
- Style: Baroque

The church of San Giovanni in Foro in Verona, is located on Corso Magenta, near the Piazza Erbe, the site of the ancient Roman Forum on Corso Porta Borsari. A church at this site was gravely damaged during the fire that swept medieval Verona in 1172. During restorations in the early 1900s, it was found that Roman walls had been incorporated into the external walls of the church. The base of the bell-tower dates from the 14th century. The renaissance portal of the church was sculpted by Gerolamo Giolfino with statues of Saints John the Evangelist, Peter, and John the Baptist. The fresco in the niche depicting St John was completed by Nicola Giolfino . The 3 baroque bells are rung with the Veronese bellringing art.

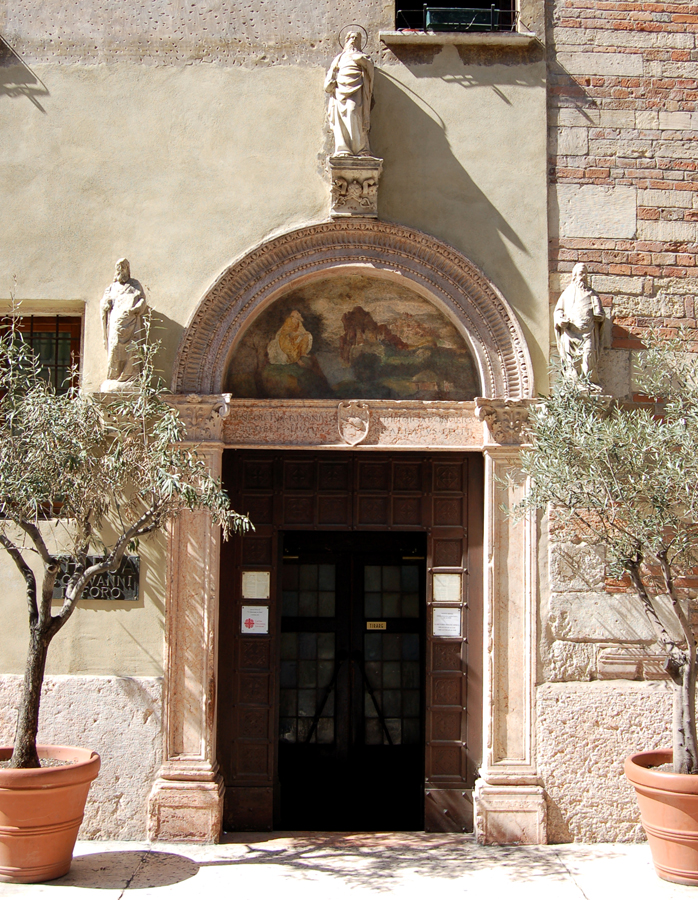
Entry Portal.

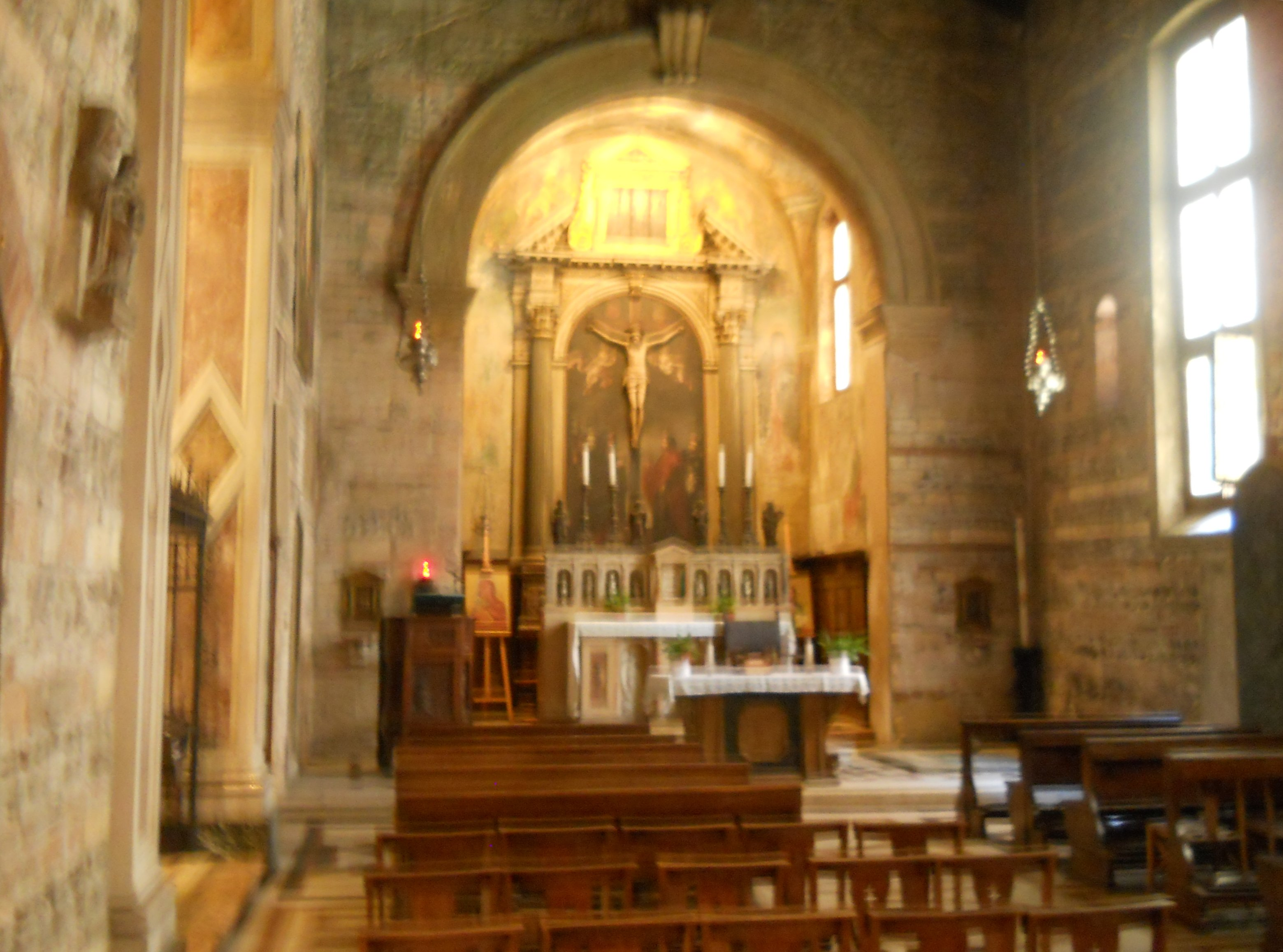
Interior.

== Bibliography ==
- G. Borelli, Chiese e monasteri di Verona (1980);Banca popolare di Verona, Verona.
- Scheda della chiesa su verona.com
