= Hradec Králové Observatory =

- Hvězdárna Hradec Králové
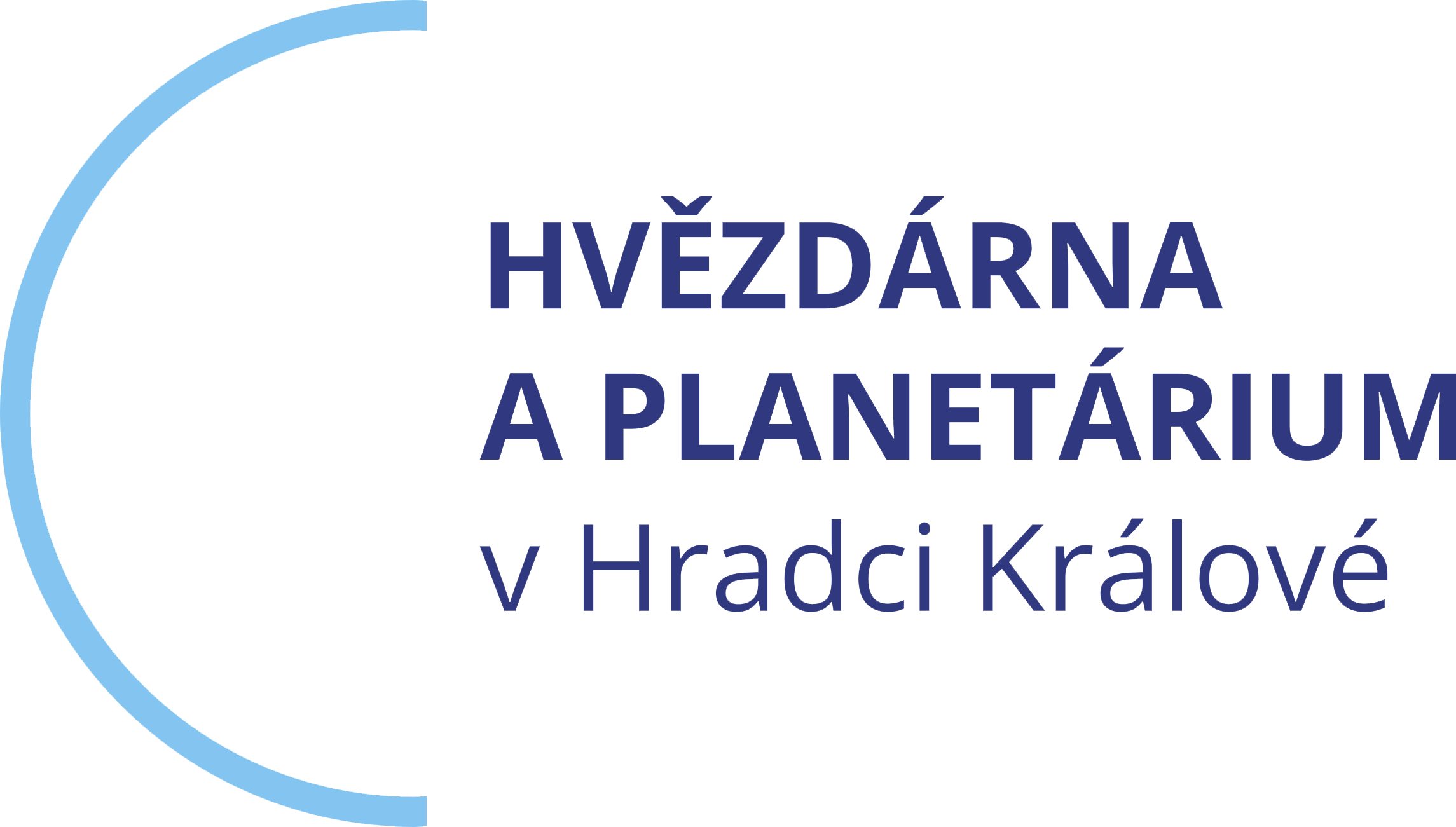

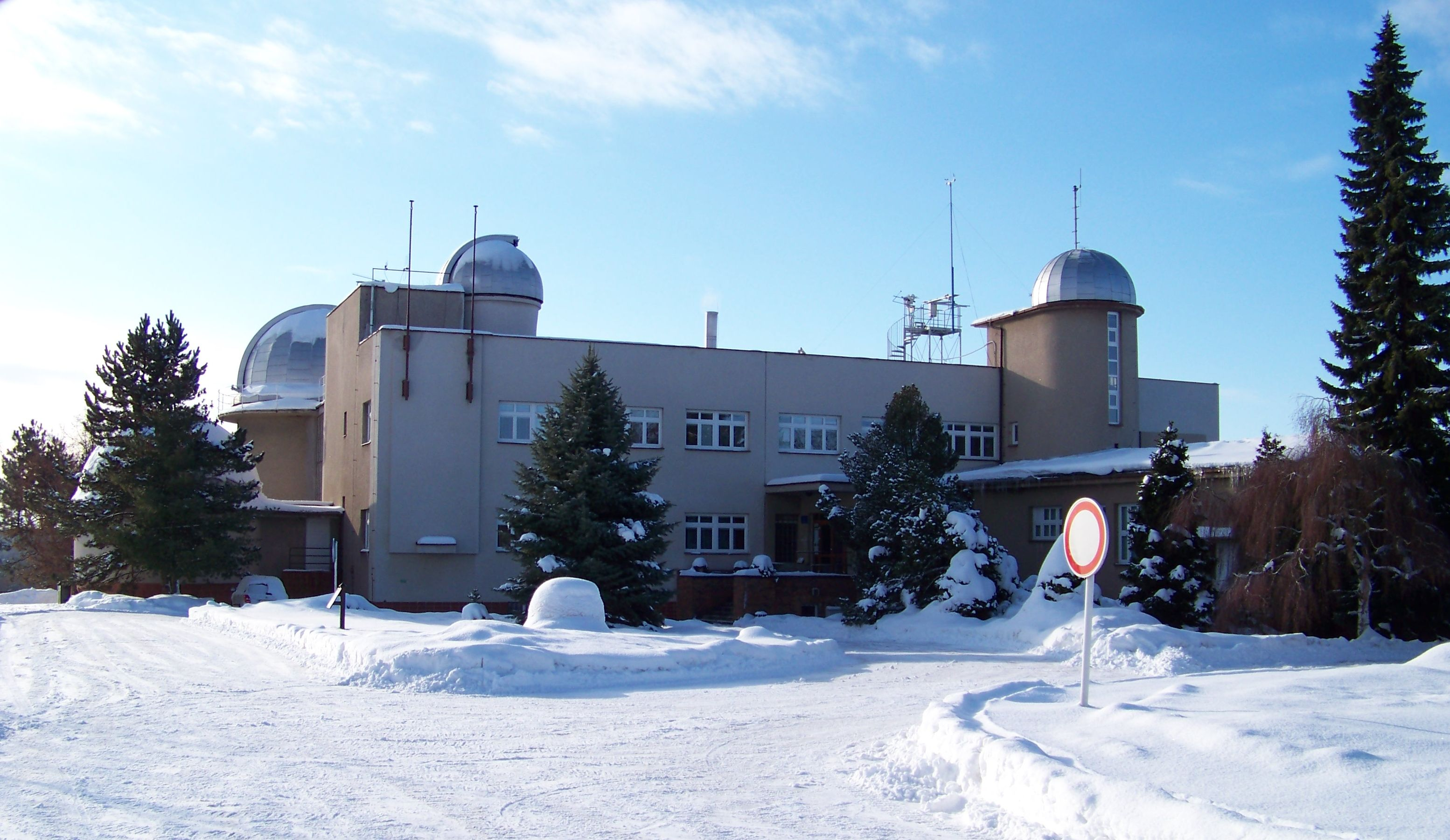
- Interactive fullscreen map
- Established: 1961; 65 years ago
- Location: Zámeček 456/30, Hradec Králové, Czech Republic, 500 08
- Coordinates: 50°10′38″N 15°50′21″E
- Website: https://www.astrohk.cz/

Hradec Králové Observatory (Czech: Hvězdárna Hradec Králové) is part astronomical observatory and part planetarium. Also housed in the same building are the Institute of Atmospheric Physics and the Czech Hydrometeorological Institute. It is located on the southern outskirts of Hradec Králové in the Czech Republic, and was founded in 1961.

== See also ==
- List of astronomical observatories
