= Meade LX200 =

Family of commercial telescopes

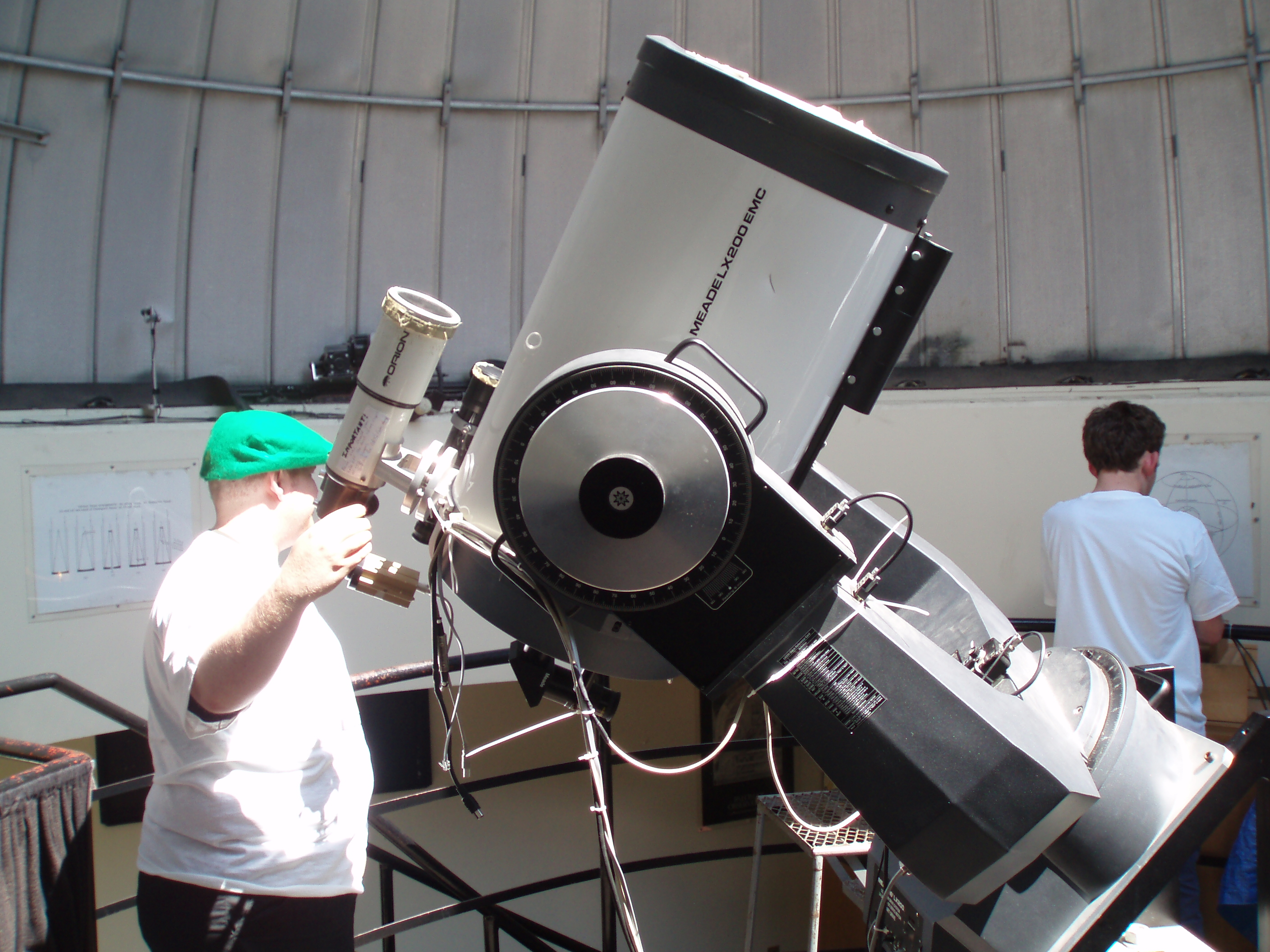
- A 16" (406.4 mm) aperture Meade LX200 in the York University Observatory
- Diameter: 16 in (0.41 m)
- Website: www.meade.com/products/telescopes/lx200.html
- Related media on Commons

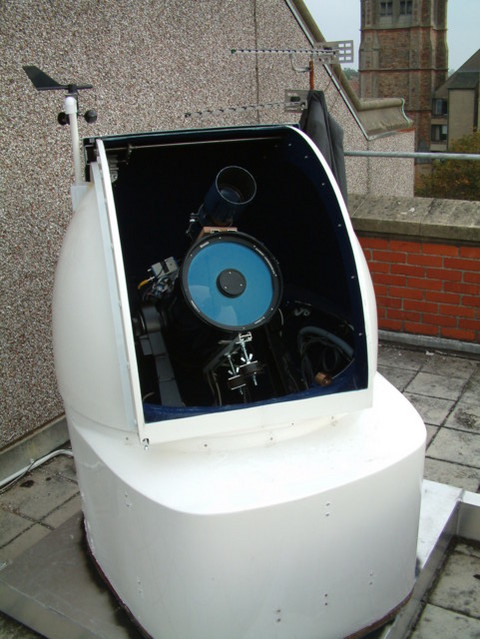
Project Galileo Meade LX200 10 inch SCT (25.4 cm aperture)

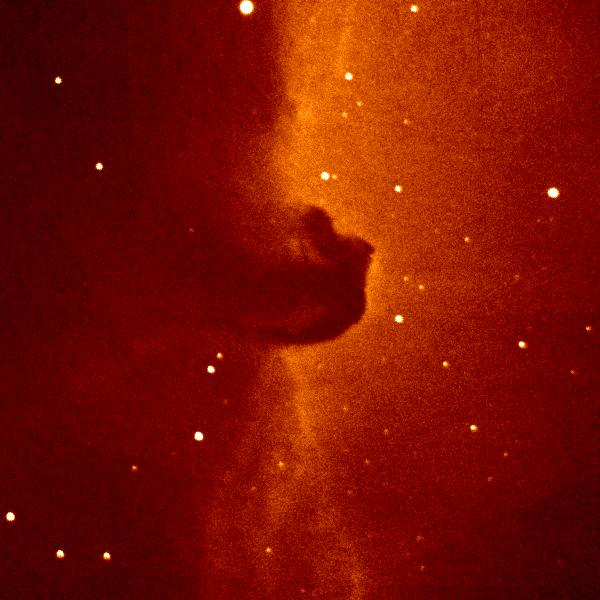
Horsehead Nebula (Barnard 33) from a 16" LX200 (40.64 cm)

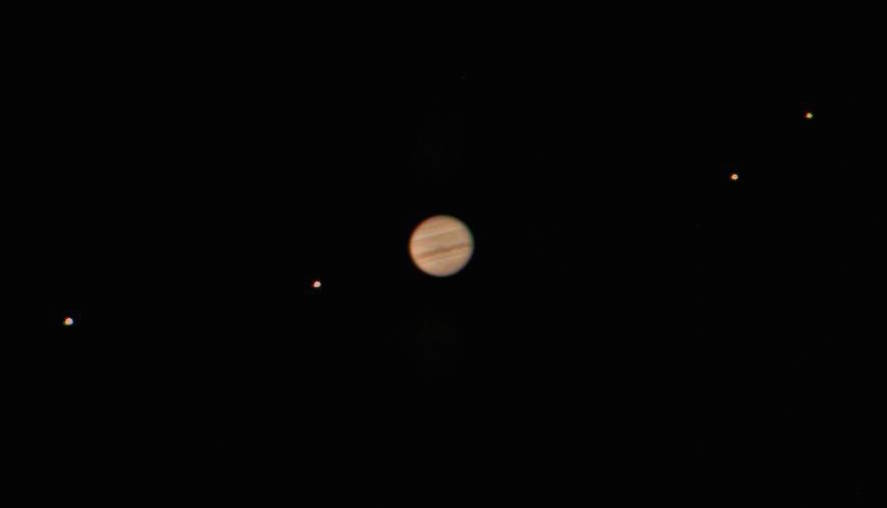
Jupiter and the Galilean moons through a 10" Meade LX200 telescope (25.4 cm)

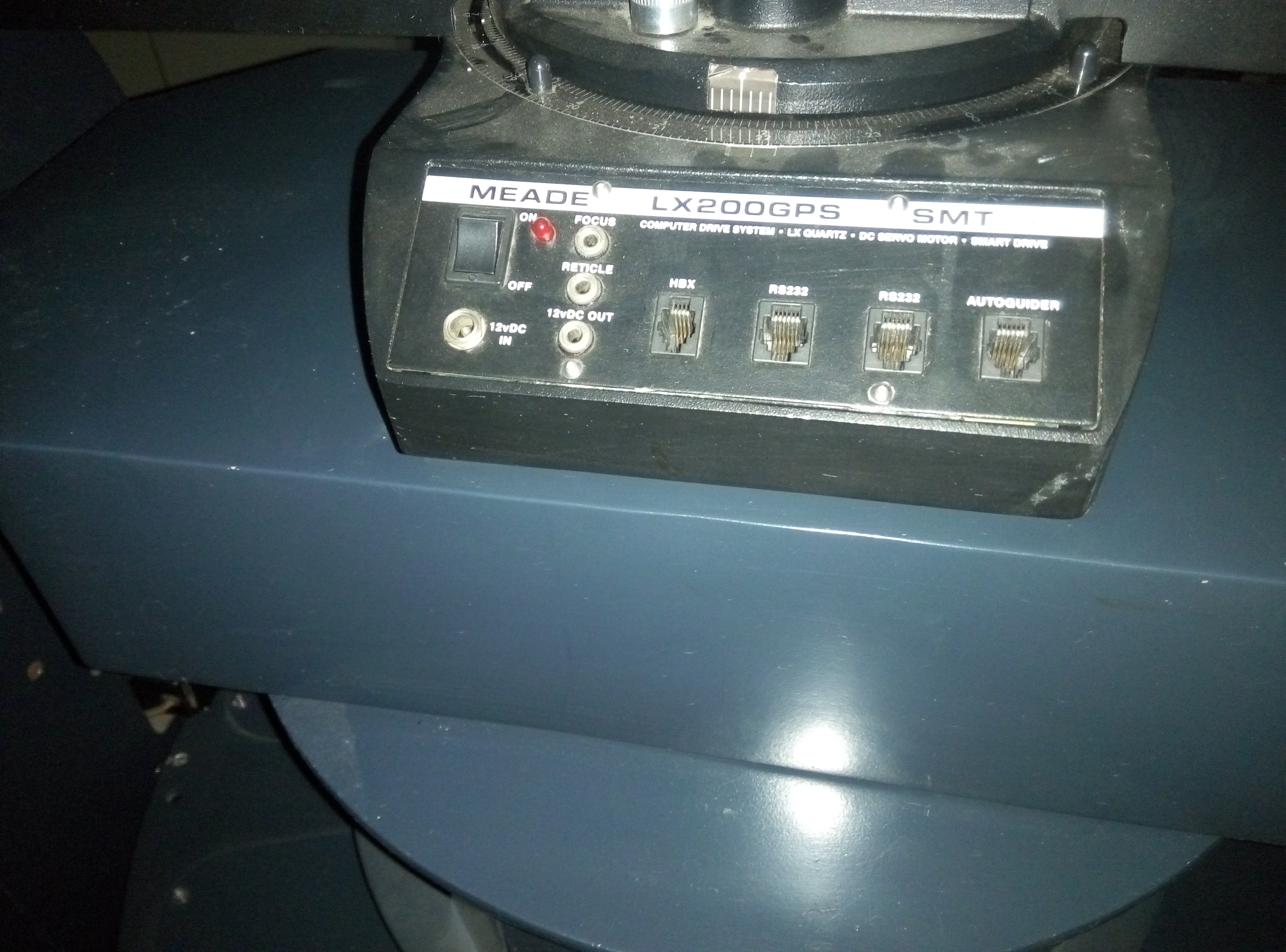
Meade LX200 in Jiamusi University Observatory, Shoot on Sep 27，2017.

The Meade LX200 is a family of Schmidt–Cassegrain commercial telescopes produced by Meade Instruments launched in 1992.

The advantage of the LX200 was price for its performance, which was accomplished by using electronics and software to equal the pointing performance of more expensive systems. Software and optical encoders corrected for errors, and the telescope also came with auto-guiding CCD and planetarium software.

== History ==
In 1992, Meade launched the LX200 series with 8" (20.32 cm) and a 10" (25.4 cm) Schmidt–Cassegrain models on computerized altazimuth mounts. Two larger models, a 12" (30.48 cm) and a 16" (40.64 cm), quickly followed. The original version was later informally named the "classic" LX200 as newer upgraded versions replaced it. The first of these was the LX200GPS, which featured global positioning system electronics. A 360 mm (14 in) LX200GPS was later added to the line.

In 2005, a related series was introduced with the even higher end RCX400 (later renamed LX400-ACF), with new optics and a motorized focus/collimation system, and with upgraded fork mount electronics. These were available in the same 8" (20.32 cm) to 16" (40.64) size range on the new fork mount, and the 16" (40.64 cm) optical tube assembly (OTA), along with a new 20" (50.8 cm) OTA, were available on a new German equatorial mount. These were all f/8 optical systems, costing up to US$50,000 (equivalent to $80,499 in 2024) for the 20" (50 cm) on the German equatorial mount.

An f/10 version of the new optics later replaced the optics of the existing LX200GPS fork mount models, with the new product line now called the LX200R (later renamed LX200-ACF). The revised optics are called advanced coma free (ACF) after a lawsuit by Star Instruments and RC Optical Systems disallowed implying that they were based on Ritchey–Chrétien optics.

In September 2012, an amateur astronomer used an LX200GPS to record an impact on the planet Jupiter.

== Installations ==
Selected observatories with LX200 telescopes.

- Grupo de Dinâmica Orbital e Planetologia da UNESP de Guaratinguetá
- Observatório da Universidade de Brasília at Universidade de Brasília
- Observatorio de la Universidad Tecnológica de Pereira
- Planetario de Medellín Jesús Emilio Ramírez Planetario de Medellín Jesús Emilio Ramírez
- Mount Wilson Observatory (prototype version)
- Ball State University Observatory
- Barus & Holley Observatory
- Bayfordbury Observatory (University of Hertfordshire Observatory)
- Bradstreet Observatory
- Campbelltown Rotary Observatory
- California Polytechnic State University in San Luis Obispo
- Chronos Observatory at Calamus Winery, Jordan, ON, Canada
- Clavius Observatory, Universidad IberoAmericana, Mexico City, Mexico
- Collins Observatory at Salem State University
- Curtis Vaughan Jr. Observatory at the University of Texas at San Antonio
- Dodge City Community College
- David Cole Observatory
- Foothill Observatory (at Foothill College)
- Frosty Drew Observatory
- Givatayim Observatory
- Olin Observatory at Gustavus Adolphus College
- Hereford Arizona Observatory
- Junk Bond Observatory
- Letchworth & District Astronomical Society
- Mead Observatory
- AMJOCH Observatory at Michigan Technological University
- Mount Albert Grammar School Observatory
- Northumberland Astronomical Society
- Nyrölä Observatory
- Observatoire des Sciences de l'Univers de Grenoble
- Observatorio Astronómico de Mallorca
- Observatório Astronômico da UESC
- Perth Observatory
- Project Galileo
- Radboud University Nijmegen in the Netherlands
- Red Barn Observatory
- Rochester Institute of Technology
- Science Education Observatory, Seoul National University, Seoul, South Korea
- Shattuck Observatory
- La Société Vaudoise des Sciences Naturelles - Lausanne, Switzerland
- Starkenburg Observatory
- Tamke-Allan Observatory
- Telus World of Science (Edmonton)
- TUBITAK National Observatory
- Van Vleck Observatory
- Vanderbilt Museum Observatory
- West Yorkshire Astronomical Society
- Widener University Observatory
- Yale Student Observatory
- York University Observatory
- Universidad de Sonora, Mexico
- Astronomical centre Rijeka
- Saint Joseph Catholic School Student Observatory, Madison, Mississippi, USA
- Harold E. Taylor Observatory at the Richard Stockton State College of New Jersey
- Observatoire du mont cosmos
- Jiamusi University Observatory
- John J. McCarthy Observatory
- Dr. Nandivada Ratnashree Memorial Mini-Observatory, University of Hyderabad
