= David Cole =

David or Dave Cole may refer to:

- David L. Cole (1902–1978), American labor mediator
- David Cole (1928–2003), Welsh journalist, later editor and chairman of the Western Mail
- Dave Cole (baseball) (1930–2011), American baseball player
- David Cole (diplomat), British diplomat
- David C. Cole (born 1952), entrepreneur and philanthropist
- David D. Cole (born 1958), legal scholar and legal director of the ACLU
- David N. Cole (active since 1980), American music producer
- David Cole (journalist) (born 1968), American journalist best known as a former Holocaust denier
- David Cole (record producer) (1962–1995), American record producer, songwriter, one half of the duo C+C Music Factory
- David Cole (footballer) (born 1962), English footballer
- David Cole (politician), American politician
- David Cole, badminton player that played in 1991 IBF World Championships – Men's singles
- Dave Cole (artist) (born 1975), American visual artist
- David R. Cole (active since 2004), Australian researcher at the University of Western Sydney

== See also ==
- David Cole House (built 1890) in Portland, Oregon, USA
- David Cole Observatory (established 2007) in Massachusetts, USA
- David Coles (disambiguation)
- Cole (surname)
