= HaAliya HaShniya Garden =

Urban park in Tel Aviv, Israel

Coordinates: 32.0697°N 34.8148°E

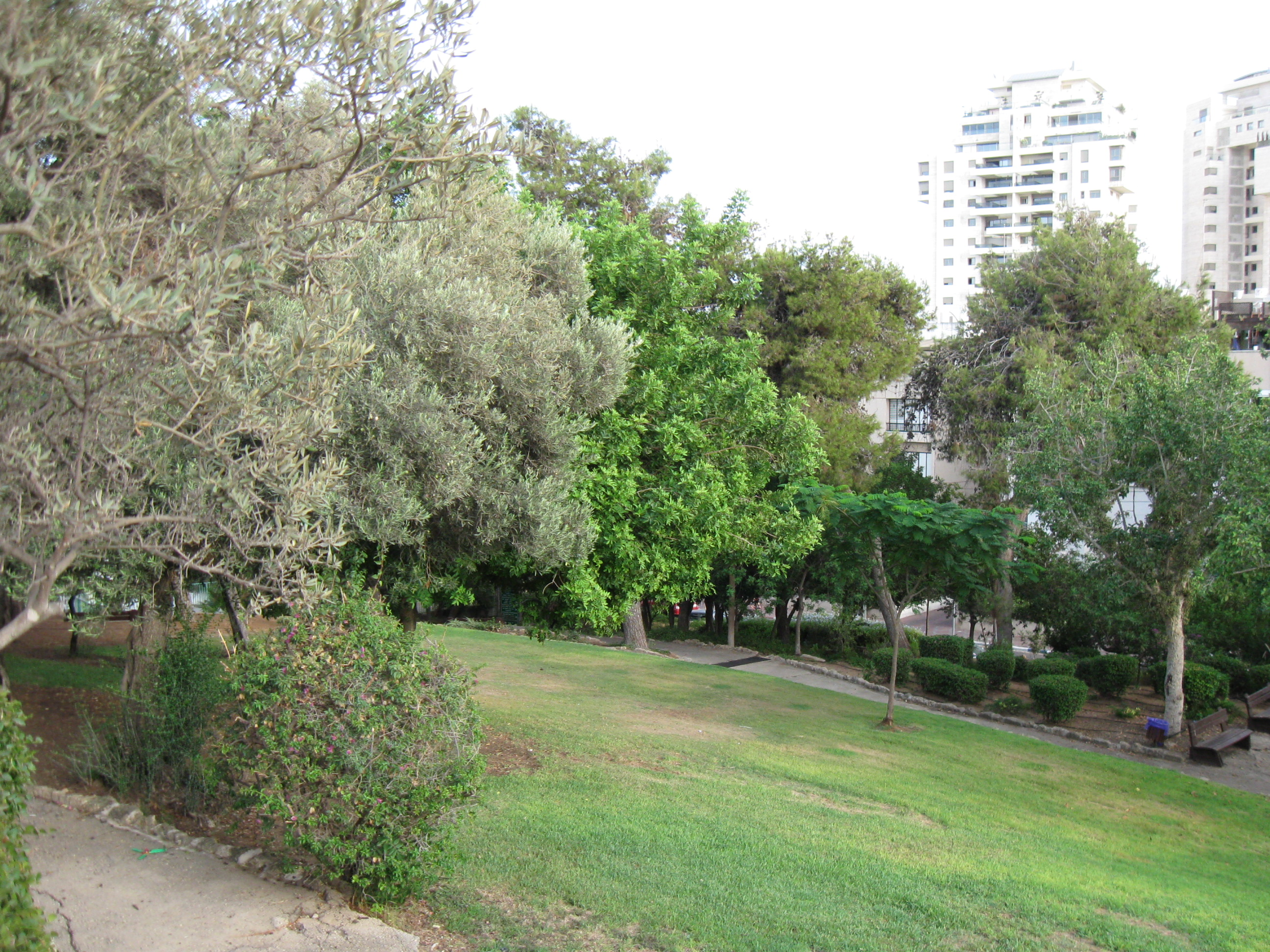
- Interactive map of HaAliya HaShniya Garden
- Type: Urban park
- Location: Givatayim, Israel
- Operator: Givatayim municipality
- Status: Open all year

HaAliya HaShniya garden (Hebrew: גן העלייה השנייה) is an urban park in Israel, located on the Kozlovsky Hill in Givatayim. Its summit overlooks the Tel Aviv Metropolitan Area. The park, which is named after the Second Aliyah, is administered by Givatayim Municipality and is one of the oldest gardens in Israel. It covers an area of 16 hectares.

HaAliya HaShniya garden was planned by the landscape architect Victor Meir in 1954 and was renovated in 2013. In the eastern part of the park stands the Givatayim Observatory, which was established in 1968 by the Israeli Astronomical Association and Givatayim Municipality.

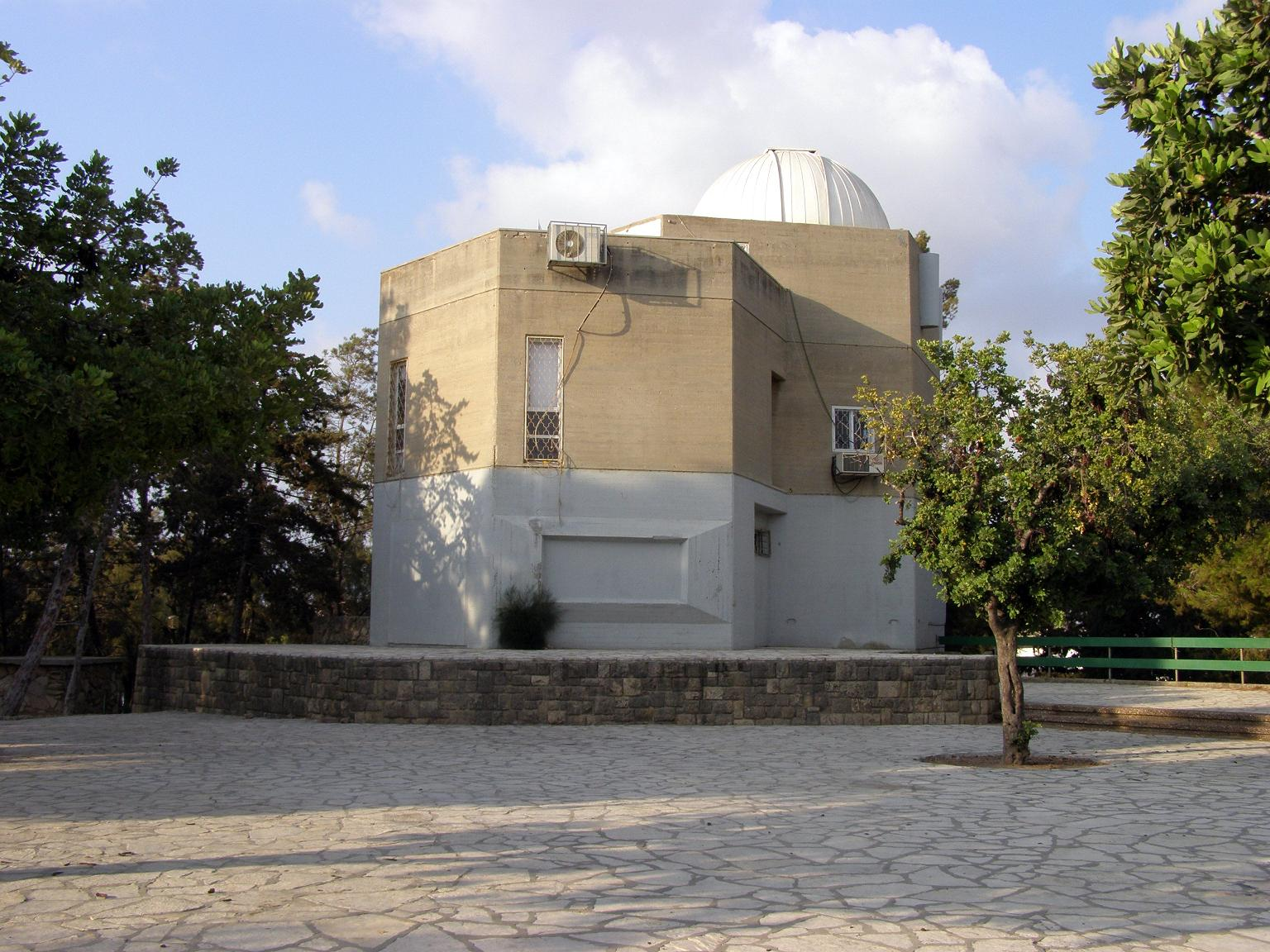
Givatayim Observatory
