= Stacey Robertson =

University president

11th President of Widener University
- Incumbent
- Assumed office July 1, 2022
- Preceded by: Julie Wollman

Personal details
- Born: Scottsdale, Arizona, U.S.
- Education: Whittier College (BA); University of California, Santa Barbara (PhD)

Academic background
- Thesis: Parker Pillsbury, antislavery apostle : gender and religion in nineteenth-century U.S. radicalism (1994)

Academic work
- Institutions: Bradley University; Central Washington University; SUNY Geneseo

Stacey Robertson started as the 11th President of Widener University in 2022. She is a historian known for her work in women and the 19th-century antislavery movement.

== Early life and education ==
Robertson was born in Scottsdale, Arizona. She has a bachelor's degree in social history and social movements from Whittier College. She earned her Ph.D. in history from the University of California, Santa Barbara.

== Career ==
Robertson accepted a position as an assistant professor at Bradley University and then remained there for twenty years, ultimately serving as an interim dean. She accepted a position as dean at Central Washington University, and then moved to become the provost at the State University of New York.

Robertson began as president in Widener University on July 1, 2022, when she took over from Julie Wollman.

== Selected publications ==
- "Hearts Beating for Liberty | Stacey M. Robertson". University of North Carolina Press.
- Robertson, Stacey M. (2000). Parker Pillsbury: radical abolitionist, male feminist. Ithaca, N.Y: Cornell University Press. ISBN 978-0-8014-3634-5.
