= Red Barn Observatory =

Observatory in Georgia, US

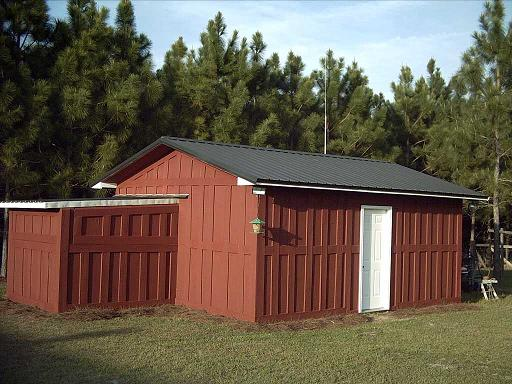
- Organization: private
- Observatory code: H68
- Location: Ty Ty, Georgia
- Coordinates: 31°23′16.74″N 83°39′7.15″W
- Altitude: 107 m (351 ft)
- Established: 2006
- Website: cometary.net

Telescopes
- Meade LX200 GPS: 0.30 meter
- Meade Starfinder: 0.25 meter

The Red Barn Observatory was established in 2006 and is dedicated to follow-up observations and detections of asteroids, comets, and Near-Earth objects. Plans for the observatory began in 2002 and construction was completed in 2005. During the month of August 2006, the observatory code H68 was assigned by the Minor Planet Center. Currently, the observatory is of the "roll-off" roof type, but plans are in the works to install an 8-foot dome in the summer of 2007.

The observatory is located in Ty Ty, Georgia, USA – well away from any city light pollution and is in an excellent location to perform the follow-up observations of near-Earth objects and potentially hazardous asteroids that are near the vicinity of Earth on a regular basis. Also performed in the observatory is an early evening sky survey (such as Palomar sky survey or NEAT – Near-Earth Asteroid Tracking) to search for new comets and/or other unknown objects low on the horizon that can be easily overlooked due to the position of the object. Most amateur discovered comets are found in this location.

Future plans for the observatory include an amateur based asteroid study program that will allow the "amateur astrometrist" on-line access to observatory images and there they will be able to perform astrometry on all detected asteroids or comets.

Established in July 2007, the Georgia Fireball Network began monitoring the skies for bright meteors and fireballs. Currently, there are two stations in the Georgia Fireball Network. Station 1 is located in Buena Vista at the Deer Run Observatory and Station 2 is located in Ty Ty, Georgia at the Red Barn Observatory. Together, the stations monitor skies over most of Georgia and parts of Florida and Alabama.

Observer/Owner Steve E. Farmer Jr.

== See also ==
- List of astronomical observatories
