= David Coles =

David Coles may refer to:

- David Coles (footballer) (born 1964), English football goalkeeping coach
- David Coles (author), science fiction writer featured in New Writings in SF 19
- David Coles (bishop) (born 1943), Anglican bishop in New Zealand
- David Coles (radio host), former host of the radio show Variety Tonight
- David G. Coles, Canadian lawyer
- David Coles, a Canadian hip hop musician, with stage name Kyprios

== See also ==
- John David Coles, American film and television director
- David Cole (disambiguation)
