= Widener University Observatory =

Observatory in Pennsylvania, US

- Organization: Widener University
- Location: Chester, Pennsylvania, USA
- Coordinates: 39°51′44″N 75°21′30″W
- Established: 2004
- Website: Widener University Observatory

Telescopes
- Meade Telescope: 16 inch LX200GPS SCT
- Meade Telescope: 12 inch LX200GPS

The Widener University Observatory is an astronomical observatory owned and operated by Widener University, but donated by NASA. It is located in Kirkbride Hall on Widener's main campus in Chester, Pennsylvania. The observatory is intended for student use and research within the physics and astronomy department. In addition, public viewing sessions occur throughout the year that are opened to the surrounding community.

The observatory includes a 20.5 foot ASH dome housing a 16" LX200GPS SCT Meade telescope. Four smaller 12" LX200GPS Meade telescopes are used on two observation decks. (See Meade LX200)

== See also ==
- List of astronomical observatories
