= Roane State Community College =

College in eastern Tennessee, U.S.

Coordinates: 35.878°N 84.620°W

Roane State logo

Roane State Community College is a public community college in eastern Tennessee, with its main campus in Harriman in Roane County. It was authorized by the Tennessee General Assembly in 1969, along with two other community colleges, and operates under the authority of the Tennessee Board of Regents.

There were 6,214 students as of fall 2013. The college's student-faculty ratio is 19:1.

Along with the main campus in Harriman, additional campuses are located in Oak Ridge, LaFollette, Crossville, Jamestown, Knoxville, Lenoir City, Huntsville, and Wartburg.

== History ==
The first classes were offered in the fall of 1971 at a temporary location, and in August 1973 the college moved to the current location of its main campus on Patton Lane in Harriman.

Roane State's first permanent branch campus, designated as the Oak Ridge campus, was located in western Knox County near the Pellissippi Parkway and was shared with State Technical Institute at Knoxville, another Board of Regents institution. In the fall of 1988, two years after the campus opened in 1986, State Technical Institute became Pellissippi State Technical Community College and took over the entire campus, while Roane State moved its Oak Ridge classes to leased sites in Oak Ridge. A new permanent Roane State Oak Ridge campus opened in Oak Ridge on August 13, 1999.

In 1989 higher education centers were established in leased facilities in Cumberland, Scott, and Loudon counties. In 1990 a center was opened in Campbell County. The Scott County center relocated to a permanent site in Huntsville in 1994 and the Cumberland County center opened in a permanent site in Crossville in 1998. Also in 1998, Roane State's Center for Health Sciences moved into a new leased facility in western Knox County that was built specifically for the college and the Tamke-Allan Observatory, a new college center for astronomy, was dedicated. A Morgan County campus was constructed in Wartburg in 2008.

In 2013, Roane State began offering courses at the Clinton Higher Education and Workforce Training Facility.

=== Presidents ===
The college president is Chris Whaley.

The college's first president was Cuyler Dunbar, who served from 1970 until 1988 when he left to become president of Catawba Valley Community College in North Carolina. He was succeeded by Sherry L. Hoppe, who served in the position (initially on an interim basis) until 2000, when she became interim president of Austin Peay State University in Clarksville. After Hoppe's departure, Bill Fuqua served as interim president until 2001, when Wade McCamey became president. McCamey left Roane State in 2005 to be president of Walters State Community College. Gary Goff assumed the presidency in the fall of 2005. Goff retired in October 2012 and was succeeded by Chris Whaley, who had previously served as vice president of student learning/chief academic officer.

Previous presidents

- Cuyler Dunbar (president 1970–1988)
- Sherry L. Hoppe (interim president, president 1988–2000)
- William S. Fuqua (interim president 2000–2001)
- Wade B. McCamey (president 2001–2005)
- Gary Goff (president 2005–2012)

== Academics ==
Roane State offers career-preparation programs and transfer programs. The college's associate of applied science programs (A.A.S) and certificate programs are designed for students who wish to enter the workforce after graduating. The college also offers transfer programs for students who wish to start at Roane State and then transfer to a four-year institution after two years. Roane State also has noncredit courses for professionals in business, healthcare, and other fields.

== Athletics ==
Roane State maintains membership in the Eastern Division of the Tennessee Junior and Community College Athletic Association. The school fields teams in men's and women's basketball, men's baseball and women's softball. Roane State's mascot is the Raider.

Andy Landers, coach of the University of Georgia's women's basketball team and a member of the Women's Basketball Hall of Fame, got his start coaching at Roane State. Former Roane State player Bernadette Mattox, who played under Landers, was inducted into the induction into the Tennessee Community College Athletic Association Hall of Fame in 2013.

In November 2008, 73-year-old Roane State student Ken Mink became the oldest person ever to score in a college basketball game, sinking two free throws against King College. Mink played one semester until being declared academically ineligible after failing a Spanish course.

== Campus locations ==
Roane State has ten satellite campuses and centers, including the main campus.

- Harriman – main campus (Roane County)
- Knoxville – Center for Health Sciences
- Rockwood (Tamke-Allan Observatory)
- Oak Ridge/Anderson County
- La Follette/Campbell County
- Crossville/Cumberland County
- Jamestown/Fentress County
- Lenoir City/Loudon County
- Wartburg/Morgan County
- Huntsville/Scott County

== Notable alumni ==
- Bernadette Mattox, college and WNBA basketball coach
- Ken Mink, college athlete
- Lowell Russell, politician
- Barry A. Vann, author and former university dean
- Morgan Wallen, country singer (briefly attended, did not graduate)
