= Barry A. Vann =

American author and academic (born 1960

Barry Aron Vann
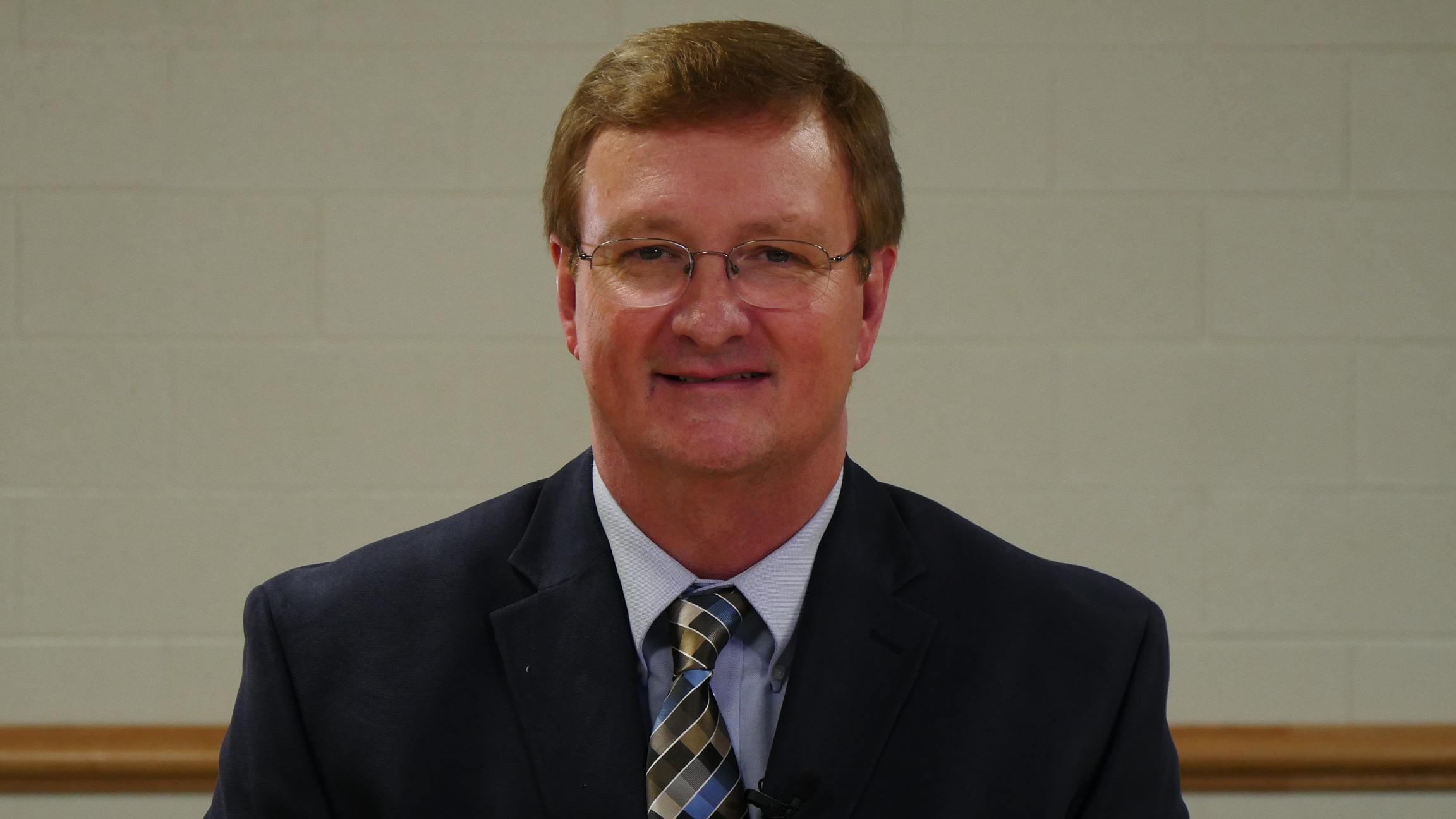
- Vann in 2017
- Born: March 30, 1960 (age 66); Clinton, Tennessee, U.S.
- Education: Roane State Community College (A.S.); Tennessee Technological University (B.S. in Social Sciences); Western Kentucky University (M.S. in Geography); University of Arkansas (Ed.D. in Adult Education); University of Glasgow (Ph.D. in Historical Geography)
- Occupations: Author; Lecturer; Academic administrator
- Writing career
- Years active: 1990s–present
- Subjects: Religious geography; Environmental perception; Cultural geography
- Notable work: In Search of Ulster-Scots Land
- Notable awards: Roane State Community College Outstanding Alumni Award (2012)

Barry Aron Vann (born March 30, 1960) is an American author, speaker, and retired dean of Behavioral and Social Sciences at Colorado Christian University. His research focuses on environmental perceptions and religious geography, particularly on the relationship between religious beliefs and environmental views in politicized regions such as Northern Ireland and the American Bible Belt.

== Early life and education ==
Vann was born in Clinton, on March 30, 1960, to Dorothy A. Voyles (b. 1934) and Harry Mack Vann, Jr. (1935–2010). According to genealogical sources, he is a distant relative of Cherokee Chief James Vann and comedian Will Rogers. He was primarily raised by his maternal grandparents, Rufus (1912–1995) and Vernedith Voyles (1919–1999), in a home without indoor plumbing and heated by a wood- or coal-burning stove. He also spent time living with his mother, stepfather, and siblings in Detroit, Michigan. Vann has attributed his interest in geography to his experiences traveling between these environments.

He earned a Ph.D. in Historical Geography from the University of Glasgow, a degree jointly awarded by the faculties of Church History and Earth and Geographical Sciences. He also holds a Doctor of Education (Ed.D.) in adult education with a concentration in community development from the University of Arkansas, an M.S. in Geography from Western Kentucky University, and a B.S. in Social Sciences from Tennessee Technological University. He received an A.S. from Roane State Community College, which recognized him as its Outstanding Alumnus in 2012.

== Work ==
Vann's scholarship explores the intersection of geography and theology through the conceptual framework of geotheology—the study of the relationship between religious belief and geographic space. This framework was originally introduced by geographer John Kirtland Wright (1891–1969).

Building on Wright’s ideas, Vann introduced additional terms to describe how different worldviews interpret the relationship between nature and divine agency. These include geotheomisthosis (earth, God, reward) and geotheokolasis (earth, God, punishment) to reflect theological interpretations of environmental events. To capture secular perspectives, he coined geomisthosis (earth rewards) and geokolasis (earth punishes).

Beyond geotheology, Vann has contributed to discussions on the interface between historical geography, population studies, and environmental risk. His works examine how environmental and demographic factors influence human behavior and settlement patterns.

Vann’s research also examines how religious leaders influence cultural landscapes through the dissemination of belief systems. Historian Andrew D. Nicholls commented on this aspect of Vann’s work in the Journal of British Studies:

Vann acknowledges that the early Stuart policy of plantation facilitated the emigration of Scots to Ireland, and for those who feared and loathed the religious policies of the regime, early seventeenth century Ulster [nine northern counties in Ireland] could stand as a land of refuge. But only for some. Scotland featured numerous socioeconomic challenges, and for some dissenters, rising rents, unproductive lands, and failed crops were evidence of punishment from an angry God. Therefore, migration became an opportunity to atone for one's sins as well, although individuals leaving Scotland owing to poverty could expect little sympathy from their religious leaders.

== Publications ==
Vann's academic works include Rediscovering the South's Celtic Heritage; In Search of Ulster-Scots Land: The Birth and Geotheological Imaginings of a Transatlantic People; Geography Toward History: Studies in the Mediterranean Basin and Mesopotamia (with Ellsworth Huntington); The Forces of Nature: Our Quest to Conquer the Planet; Presbyterian Social Ties and Mobility in the Irish Sea Culture Area, 1610–1690; and Climate Change in History: A Geotheological Perspective (2020), which uses biblical and qur'anic narratives alongside paleoclimatological studies to establish dates for those writings and to examine how ancient societies understood climate and weather.

His book Puritan Islam: The Geoexpansion of the Muslim World was selected by Choice, a division of the American Library Association (ALA), as a Top 25 Outstanding Academic Title for 2012. A review in the April 2012 issue of Choice wrote that Puritan Islam was "perhaps the best geographical text produced on this subject since 2000" and of "utmost significance in finally taking the topic away from the emotional to where it needs to be—rational and explanatory discussion." On her show Spirited Debate, Lauren Green of Fox News referred to Puritan Islam as a "fascinating book."

== Media ==
Vann has appeared as a guest on radio and television programs, including BBC Scotland; Fox News Channel's "Spirited Debate" with Lauren Green; Ecotopia with Susan and Stephen Tchudi; "Science Fantastic" with Professor Michio Kaku; the "Mancow Experience"; "Point of Inquiry" with Josh Zepps; BBC Two; Northern Visions TV in Belfast, Northern Ireland; and PBS's Tennessee Life.
