= Old Main and Chemistry Building =

- U.S. National Register of Historic Places
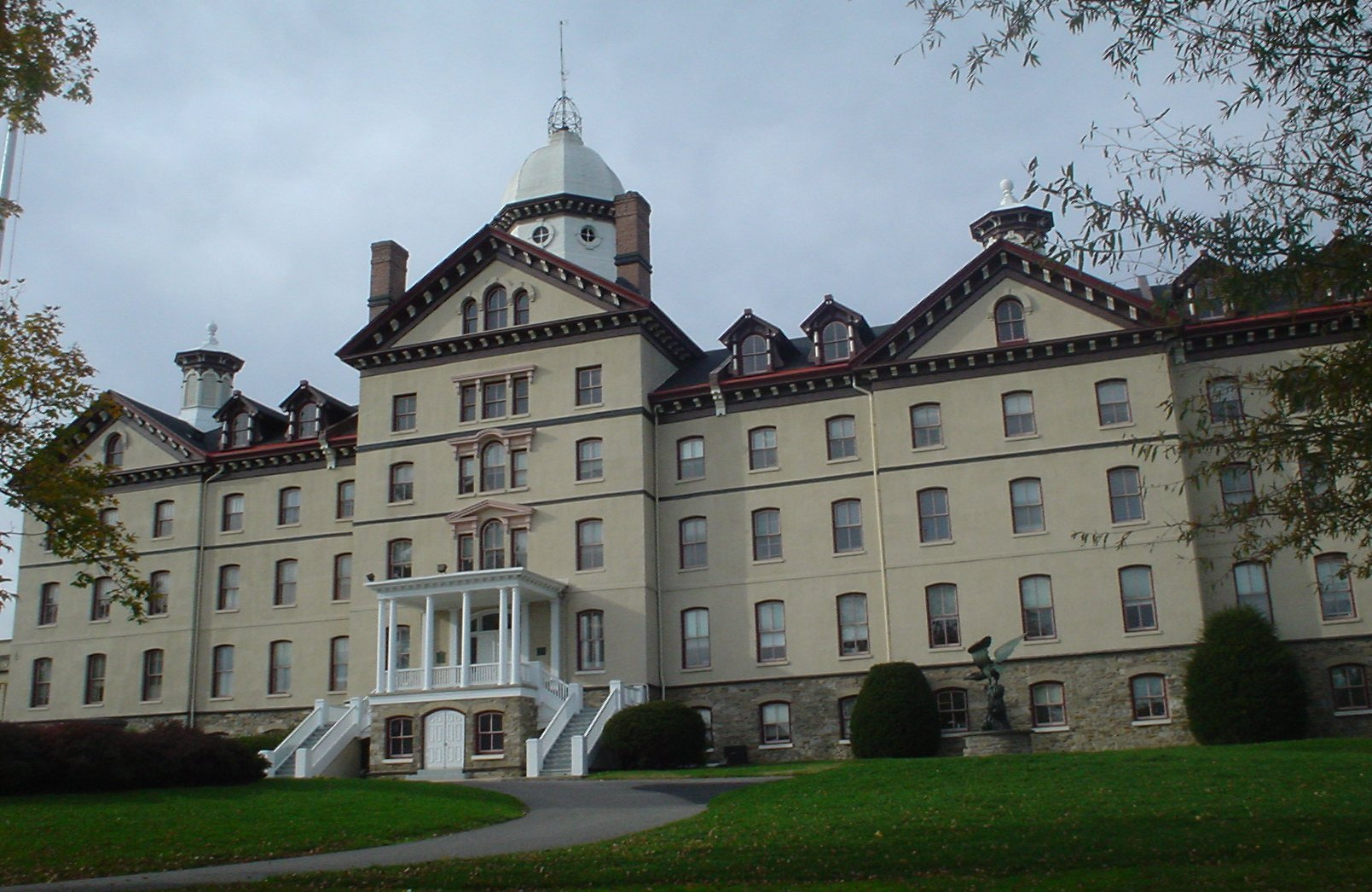
- Old Main and Chemistry Building, November 2009

- Location within Pennsylvania Location within the United States
- Location: 14th St. between Melrose Ave. and Walnut St., Chester, Pennsylvania
- Coordinates: 39°51′42″N 75°21′19″W
- Area: 1 acre (0.40 ha)
- Built: 1867
- Built by: Crump, John & Shedwick, John
- Architect: Crump, John
- NRHP reference No.: 78002389
- Added to NRHP: May 22, 1978

The Old Main and Chemistry Building are two connected, historic, American buildings that were erected in 1867 and 1883 and are presently located on the campus of Widener University in Chester, Pennsylvania.

Both buildings were listed on the National Register of Historic Places in 1978.

== Description ==
The Old Main building is four-stories high with a stucco and Wissahickon schist stone exterior. It has a two-pitched roof with a central grand pediment and two minor flanking pediments. Atop the grand pediment is a unique "dome" structure and atop both minor pediments are matching cupola.

The measurements of the building are 243 feet (east to west) by 65 feet (East end) and 55 feet (West end) with walls that are two-and-one-half feet thick. The discrepancy in the measurements is the result of renovations that were made to the structure in 1883 following a fire that destroyed the upper floors on the eastern end. The symmetry of the building was lost with the eastern addition of an auditorium, classrooms and dormitory space.

The Chemistry Building is adjacent to Old Main and is a three-story building that measures 37 feet by 51 feet. It is connected to Old Main by a wrought iron and plank-board walk-way extending from the second floor of each structure. It was built in order to separate dangerous laboratory conditions from the dormitory area of the Old Main building.

== History ==
The Old Main building was built in 1867 and the Chemistry building in 1883. Old Main served as the primary quarters for the Pennsylvania Military Academy and Pennsylvania Military College from 1867 to 1957. After expansion of the school and construction of additional facilities, Old Main was used as the center of administrative services for the College.
