= Ken Mink =

American basketball player

Ken Paul Mink (born 1935) is an American who, at the age of 73, is believed to be the oldest person ever to score in a college basketball game. Mink sank two free throws for Roane State Community College (in Harriman, Tennessee) in their game against King College on November 3, 2008.

== Background ==
Mink, a resident of Maryville, Tennessee, attended Lees College in Jackson, Kentucky, in the 1950s, where he played varsity basketball. In the fall of 1956, when he was a sophomore, he left the college. Mink says he left because he was expelled for a campus prank that he did not commit. An ESPN investigation later confirmed Mink was not the prankster. He subsequently joined the U.S. Air Force, serving for four years. After leaving the Air Force, he began a 38-year career as a journalist. He was an editor with the Knoxville News Sentinel (Knoxville, Tennessee) from 1972 to 1985, the Kingsport Times (Kingsport, Tennessee) from 1985 to 1988, and the Harrisonburg Daily News Record (Harrisonburg, Virginia) from 1988 to 1998, and began his retirement in 1999. Although he played basketball in military tournaments and recreation leagues, he did not resume his college athletic career until 2008, so he never used up his college eligibility. He continued to compete in the National Senior Olympic Games competition in his early 80s. In 2016, Mink founded the non-profit Get Up and Go!! Foundation, designed to inspire senior citizens to live a more physical lifestyle. He performed halftime basketball exhibitions at numerous high school and college basketball arenas and was still making such appearances at age 81 in the 2016–2017 season. He said he planned to continue such exhibitions through the 2017–18 season and possibly until he reached the age of 90. He has written 26 books through 2023 (available on Amazon and other publishers) and is a travel writer with the International Travel Writers Alliance (London, England).

== Playing college basketball as a septuagenarian ==
In 2007, Mink contacted several colleges in the Knoxville area to see if any would allow him to play basketball. Roane State coach, Randy Nesbit, expressed interest. Nesbit has said that he was curious about potential athletic performance of a septuagenarian who had kept himself in good physical condition. Mink enrolled as a student at Roane State and joined the team.

Mink was fouled in the game against King College, giving him the opportunity to shoot two free throws, scoring on both. He continued to participate as a member of Roane State's 2008–2009 team, playing in seven games and scoring in three. On January 24, 2009, he scored a two-point field goal in a game against Hiwassee College, becoming the oldest person to ever score a field goal in a college basketball game. His participation on the Roane State team generated worldwide media attention and increased average attendance at Roane State's home games from about 100 to 400. Mink was ruled ineligible to play during the second semester and Roane State was forced to forfeit a game for using an ineligible player. Mink had dropped a Spanish class during the first semester that resulted in the shortage of the 12-hour minimum credit hours. He took a college-approved online course to gain the required college hours and was ruled academically eligible by Roane State. According to Mink, he was "administratively ineligible by the National Junior College Athletic Association (NJCC) for the second semester because of a technical requirement regarding Roane State's delayed reporting of an online course. Roane State appealed the ruling, noting that Mink successfully completed a course from Strayer University to achieve the required number of credits for the semester. However, the appeal was denied.

Mike Sutton, basketball coach for Tennessee Tech University, invited Mink to be a walk-on player for the 2010-11 season, but the NCAA told Sutton that Mink had no more NCAA college eligibility because of the 5-4 Rule, which requires NCAA athletes to complete their four years of eligibility in five-year period. After his late college basketball was over, Mink became a Senior Olympics player, winning more than a dozen gold medals for team and individual competition. He was still active as of 2017, winning Tennessee state gold medals in free throw shooting, three-point shooting and free-style (hotshot) shooting. He also served several years as a Tennessee high school basketball referee and high school baseball/softball umpire.

== Controversy ==
Wright Thompson of ESPN The Magazine did an in-depth article about Ken Mink called "The Legend of Ken Mink." When researching the article, Thompson found conflicting evidence regarding the alleged prank incident. Thompson contacted Mink's former roommate, team members, friends, and school faculty. At first, Thompson could not find anyone who recollected the prank incident. Eventually, however, one person did corroborate Mink's story, but no one else was identified as having been responsible.

== Other activities ==
Mink is also the author of 20 books, including So, You Want Your Kid to be a Sports Superstar and Hoops Dreamer: The Ken Mink Story. He and his wife, Emilia, edit an online travel magazine, The Travelling Adventurer (www.travellingadventurer.com).
