= Ball State University Observatory =

Observatory in Indiana, US

Coordinates: 40°12′00″N 85°24′41″W

The Ball State University Observatory is a collection of five permanently mounted telescopes on the Cooper Science Building on the campus of the Ball State University in Muncie, IN. Its largest telescope is a 16-inch Meade LX200. The observatory is used primarily for student astronomy classes and not research. The observatory also hosts public observation events for enthusiasts.

== See also ==
- List of observatories
