= Mead Observatory =

Observatory in Columbus, Georgia

Smurfit WestRock Observatory
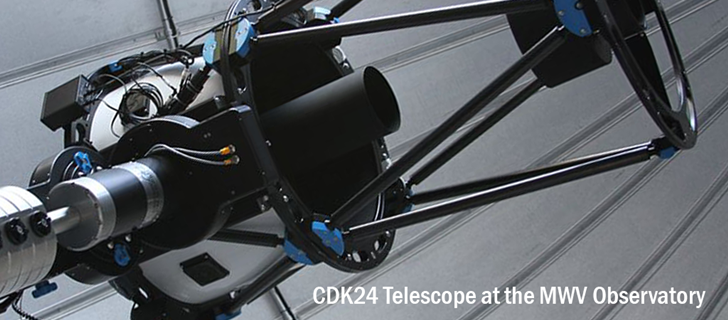
- The 24 inch PlaneWave CDK at the WestRock Observatory
- Organization: Columbus State University
- Location: Columbus, Georgia, US
- Coordinates: 32°27′35″N 84°59′44″W
- Altitude: ~73 meters (240 feet)
- Established: 2001
- Website: WestRock Observatory

Telescopes
- Meade LX200 Schmidt-Cassegrain (no longer operational): 0.4 meter
- PlaneWave CDK: 0.6 meter

The Smurfit WestRock Observatory (formerly known as the Mead Observatory; MPC code W22) is operated by Columbus State University's Coca-Cola Space Science Center at 701 Front Avenue, Columbus, Georgia. Established in 1996, the observatory has active night sky and solar study programs for students and the general public. The equipment can be controlled and monitored remotely by faculty and astronomers. The observatory also offers mobile astronomy programs such as "Astronomy Nights" at Callaway Gardens, F. D. Roosevelt State Park, and Providence Canyon State Park as well as education outreach to the surrounding Georgia/Alabama area.

== Outreach ==
As part of the Coca-Cola Space Science Center, the WestRock Observatory offers education outreach in the form of astronomy-based activities and teaching tools. The WRO's Real-time Interactive Solar Observatory (RISO) allows teachers across the world to log into the observatory's website and use the WRO's solar telescope video/images as a teaching tool in their classroom. A similar program called Real-time Interactive Observatory (RIO) offers the same opportunity but for night-time observations. The Coca-Cola Space Science Center itself is a constant host to surrounding schools. Students in and around the Phenix City, Alabama and Columbus, Georgia area come to the CCSSC as part of field trips or independent visits. This includes access to the Omnisphere Planetarium, Challenger Learning Center, and many other educational facilities.

== Solar Research ==
The majority of research conducted at the WestRock Observatory is centered around solar imaging. By utilizing narrowband filters such as Hydrogen-alpha and Calcium-K, students are able to produce multi-band images and videos of the Sun. Those engaged in solar observations often collaborate closely with the RISO program. Additionally, students at the WRO are actively involved in webcasts showcasing transits and eclipses using these specialized telescopes, with some of their work being recognized and featured on NASA's Astronomy Picture of the Day.

== Night-Time Research ==
Columbus State University students are able to, upon training, use the WestRock Observatory as a research tool for various night-time projects. Current research topics, as of 2016, include narrowband and broadband nebulae and galaxy imaging, astrometric asteroid and comet orbit refinement, and variable star photometry. As the observatory undergoes upgrades, many more topics will be possible such as supernova remnants. In 2015, a group of student researchers sought out to give the WRO a Minor Planet Center Observatory Code. They succeeded and the WRO is now code W22. With this code, students are able to submit astrometry data to the Minor Planet Center with ease.

== Gallery ==
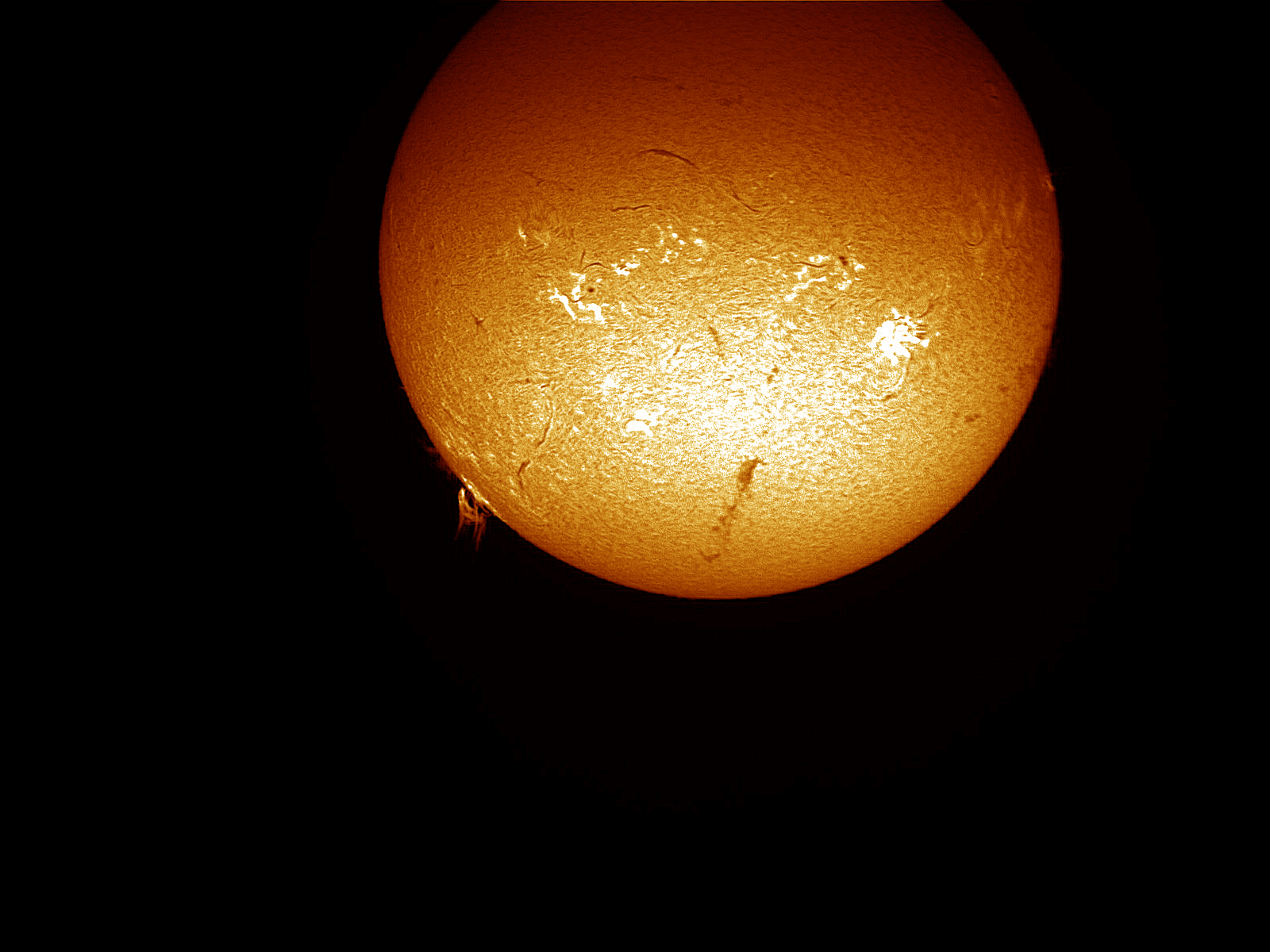
A solar flare, called Getz's Dragon, captured by a 2nd grade science classroom using one of the WRO's solar telescopes

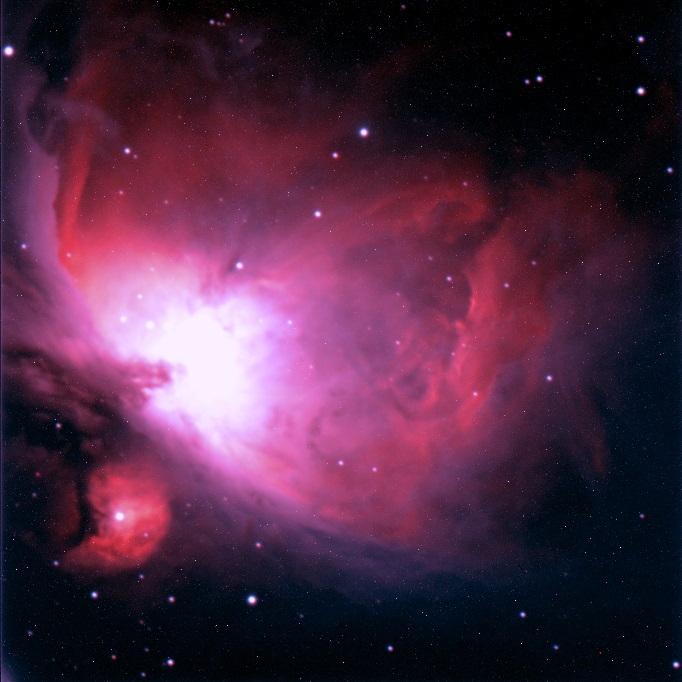
M42 as captured by the WestRock Observatory

== See also ==
- List of observatories
