= Bradstreet Observatory =

Observatory in Pennsylvania, US

- Organization: Eastern University
- Observatory code: 923
- Location: Pennsylvania, United States
- Coordinates: 40°03′01″N 75°22′08″W
- Established: 1996
- Website: web.archive.org/web/20051001005835/http://www.eastern.edu:80/academic/trad_undg/sas/depts/physsci/index.html

Telescopes
- Meade LX200 Schmidt-Cassegrain Telescope: 16” diameter reflector

Bradstreet Observatory is an astronomical observatory owned and operated by Eastern University. Built in 1996, it is located in St. Davids, Pennsylvania (USA). It is named after the current astronomy professor, David Bradstreet.

== See also ==
- List of astronomical observatories
