= Northumberland Astronomical Society =

Hauxley Observatory
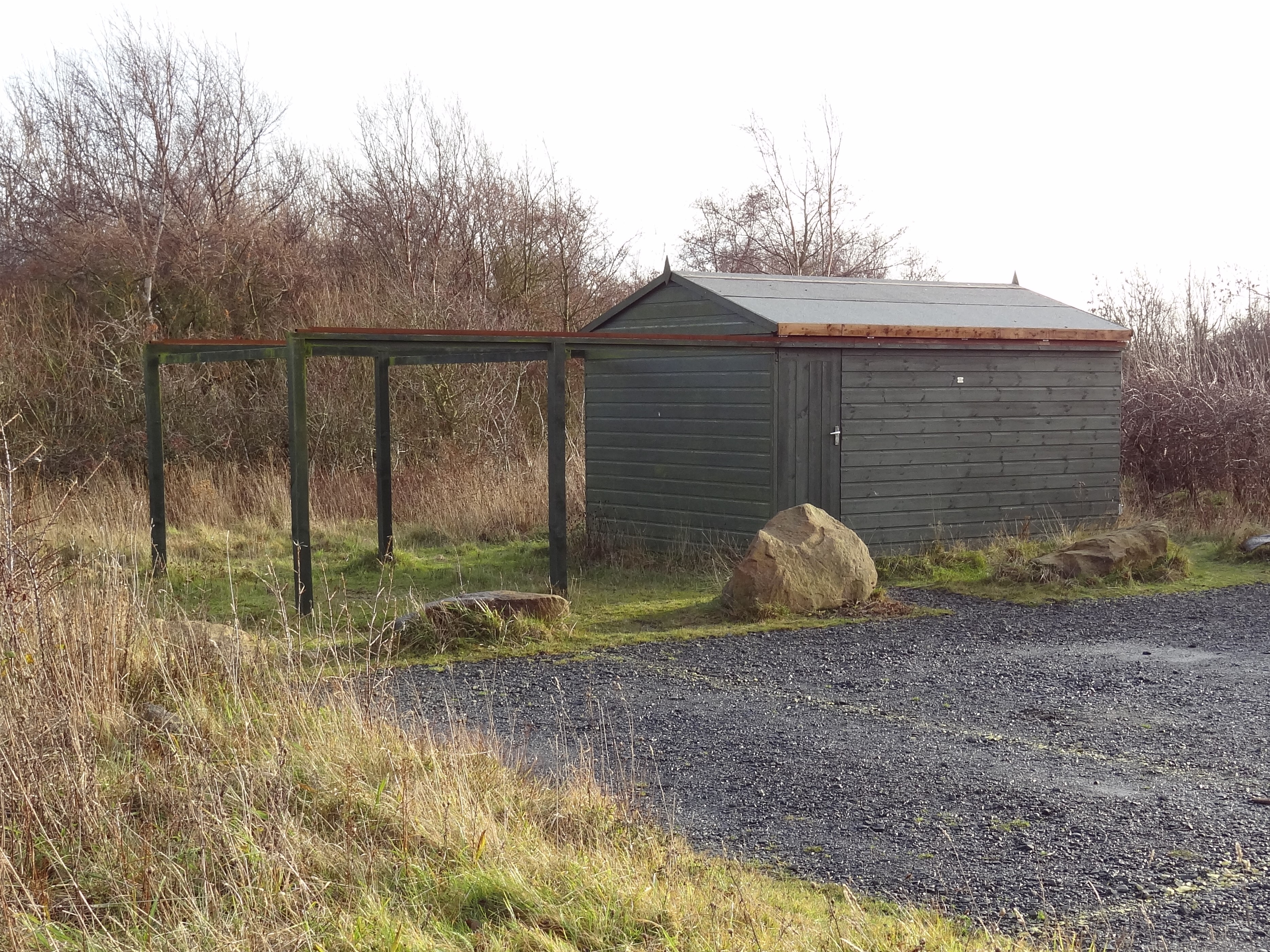
- Organization: Northumberland Astronomical Society
- Location: Hauxley Nature Reserve, Northumberland, England
- Coordinates: 55°18′54.6″N 1°33′23″W
- Altitude: 7 m (23 ft)
- Established: 2008

Telescopes
- 14 inch Meade LX200: 14 inch (355mm) Schmidt-Cassegrain

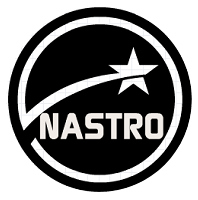
Nastro: Northumberland Astronomical Society

The Northumberland Astronomical Society was founded in 2000 by local amateur astronomers in Northumberland, UK. The society is informally known among its members as "NASTRO". The first formal meetings of the society were held in the village hall at Low Hauxley but increasing membership and the support of the Northumberland Wildlife Trust saw meetings move to the visitor centre in the nearby Hauxley Nature Reserve in 2002. The Nature Reserve was burned down in an arson attack on 29 June 2010, so society meetings are now held in the Beehive function room at The Trap Inn until the new building is completed, which is expected to be in 2017.

NASTRO's mission is to encourage astronomy and science education in the North East of England.

The society has an active public outreach programme with several volunteer lead events a year.

The society secured funding for a 14-inch Schmidt-Cassegrain telescope in 2005 and an observatory was built to house it in 2008.

In January 2011 NASTRO were part of BBC2's Stargazing Live hosted by Brian Cox (physicist) and Dara Ó Briain during which NASTRO held free events at Druridge Bay Country Park, Northumberland.

== See also ==
- List of astronomical societies
