= Julie E. Wollman =

American academic administrator and former Catholic nun

Julie Wollman

President of the Widener University
- In office 2016–2022

Personal details
- Spouse: Dan L. King
- Education: Widener University, Edinboro University, Harvard University, University of Pennsylvania, New York University

Julie Wollman is an American academic administrator and professor. She was the 10th president of Widener University, where she served 2016-2022. She was previously the president of Edinboro University of Pennsylvania.

== Early life and education ==
A Philadelphia native, Wollman spent her childhood in Montgomery County. She is a graduate of Harvard University, where she majored in English and American literature and language and minored in French. She earned her master of science in education from the University of Pennsylvania, and she earned her doctor of philosophy in education from New York University. Wollman is also a graduate of the Institute for Educational Management at the Harvard Graduate School of Education.

== Career ==
Prior to joining Widener University, Wollman served as president of Edinboro University of Pennsylvania. While there, Wollman increased enrollment and diversity of the student body. She established Porreco College, a partnership between the university and business community to improve workforce readiness.

Before becoming president of Edinboro, Wollman was vice president for academic affairs at Wheelock College in Boston, Massachusetts. She held previous positions as vice president for academic affairs at Worcester State University and dean of the Feinstein School of Education and Human Development at Rhode Island College.

Wollman serves on the board of the Riverfront Alliance of Delaware County, an economic development organization where she is a member of the executive committee. She also serves on the board of directors of new American Colleges and Universities, the Mid-Atlantic Conference of the NCAA, and the American Association of University Administrators. Wollman led a committee of the American Association of University Administrators to develop a statement on ethical principles in higher education leadership.

== Personal life ==
Wollman is married to Dan L. King, executive director of the American Association of University Administrators. They live in Wallingford, Pennsylvania.
