= Givatayim Observatory =

Astronomical observatory in Israel

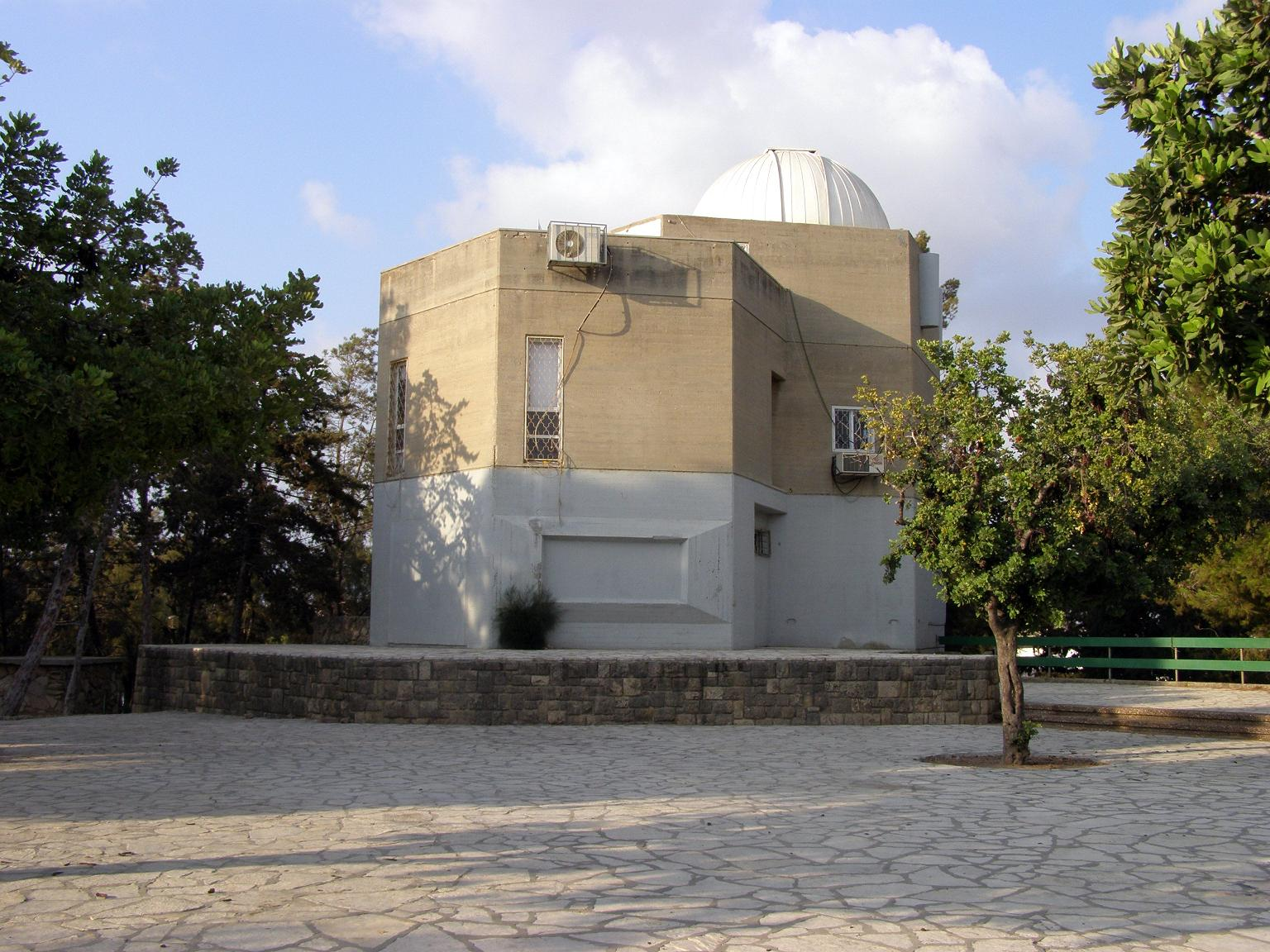
- Organization: Israeli Astronomical Association, Givatayim Municipality
- Observatory code: 137
- Location: Givatayim, Tel Aviv, Israel
- Coordinates: 32°04′11.28″N 34°48′55.15″E
- Altitude: 87 metres (285 feet)
- Established: 1968
- Website: Givatayim Observatory at the Israeli Astronomical Association website

Telescopes
- Primary Telescope: 16 inches (41 centimetres) Meade LX200 Schmidt-Cassegrain
- Secondary Telescope: 12 inches (30 centimetres) Meade LX200 Schmidt-Cassegrain
- Related media on Commons

The Givatayim Observatory is a public observatory that was founded in 1968 by the Israeli Astronomical Association and the Givatayim municipality.

== Activities ==
These are some of the activities taking place in the observatory:

- Public lectures and observations once or twice a week.
- Israeli Astronomical Association lectures every Thursday.
- Astronomy courses for adults and children
- Hosting and promoting high school projects
- Bachelor students and high school research activities (e.g., near Earth objects, variable stars, extrasolar planets)

The observatory is placed on a hill (87m above sea level) inside a public park in Givatayim (HaAliya HaShniya Garden). Givatayim is a town adjacent to Tel Aviv and part of the Greater Tel Aviv region. Because of this location, the sky is very bright and precludes observation of faint objects.

== Equipment ==
- Meade 16-inch LX200 Schmidt-Cassegrain telescope. Mostly used for astrophotography.
- Meade 12-inch LX200 Schmidt-Cassegrain telescope. Mostly used for public observations.
- Meade 16-inch Starfinder Newtonian telescope
- 6-inch Coude refractor
- Coronado 40 mm PST
- Various smaller telescopes
- Meade Deep Sky Imager (color and pro version)
- Meade Pictor 1616
- Meade Lunar-Planetary Imager
- SBIG ST-8 CCD camera.

The main telescope (16-inch Schmidt-Cassegrain telescope) is located in a dome and is dedicated to imaging and research. The other telescopes are operated on an observation terrace next to the dome. The sky in Givatayim is highly light polluted. The situation deteriorated during the last years due to new skyscrapers (Azrieli Center, Moshe Aviv Tower, new government building etc.), which are illuminated from below by strong floodlights, sending their light cones into the sky. Moreover, during the last years the bad habit of huge advertisement walls, also illuminated by strong spotlights, became widespread. Many of these spotlights are misdirected, sending their light into the sky.

Between 1984 and 2016 Dr. Igal Patel was the head of the observatory and of the Israeli Astronomical Association. Since 2016 Dr. Diana Laufer is the Scientific Director and Shalom Hananya is the administrative director. The observatory staff consists of about dozen people with specialties in different fields, including several young instructors.

== See also ==
- List of astronomical observatories
