= David R. Cole =

- Occupations: Philosopher of education, academic and author

Academic background
- Education: BA., Philosophy; PGCE., English Education; MA., Philosophy and Literature; PhD., Education
- Alma mater: University of Liverpool; Bath Spa University; University of Warwick

David R. Cole is a philosopher of education, academic and author. He is an associate professor in the School of Education, English, Literacies and ESL and has held positions as globalisation theme leader in the Centre for Educational Research, senior researcher in the Institute for Culture and Society and associate dean, HDR at Western Sydney University.

Cole's research is primarily focused on the interconnected fields of globalization, critical thinking, literacies, educational philosophy, and the work of Gilles Deleuze. During the 1990s, he noted, whilst working with Nick Land and others in the CCRU (Cybernetic Culture Research Unit), that educational theory and practice was unresponsive to major intellectual movements such as cyberpunk and since 2017, he has specialized in "Education in the Anthropocene," addressing climate-related issues. His publications comprise research articles and books including Multiliteracies in Motion: Current Theory and Practice, Multiple Literacies Theory: A Deleuzian Perspective, Educational Life-Forms: Deleuzian Teaching and Learning Practice and Education, the Anthropocene, and Deleuze/Guattari. He is the recipient of the 1999 Award for Innovation in Doctoral Study from the National Centre for Educational Technology, the 2006 University of Tasmania Teaching Merit Award and the 2022 Western Sydney University Best Ph.D. Supervision for Thesis of the Year Award.

== Education and early career ==
Cole earned a BA in philosophy from the University of Liverpool in 1990 and a PGCE in English education from Bath Spa University in 1991. He went on to obtain an MA in philosophy and literature from the University of Warwick, where he served as a university lecturer and completed his PhD in education in 2003, concurrently being the head of English at St. George's College North, Buenos Aires.

== Career ==
Cole continued his academic career as a lecturer at the University of Tasmania from 2004 to 2007 and later at the University of Technology, Sydney from 2008 to 2011. He has been an associate professor and senior researcher in the Institute for Culture and Society since 2012 and a visiting research fellow at the Global Center for Technology in Humanities, Kyung Hee University.

Since 2012, he has held the position of the globalization theme leader in the Center for Educational Research and associate dean, higher degree by research.

Cole founded the online Research Institute for Interdisciplinary Research into the Anthropocene in 2017, and has contributed as a columnist and regular contributor to the Philosophy of Education Society of Australasia's AGORA site. Additionally, he has been serving as a founding member of the Critical Postmedia Network in Asia since 2022 and the World Education Research Association (WERA), participating in an International Research Network (IRN) focusing on education in the Anthropocene, since 2024.

== Works ==
Cole has contributed to the philosophy of education by applying Deleuze and Guattari's concepts to analyze educational phenomena, focusing on micro and macro levels and developing educational methodology since 1996, with an emphasis on 'immanent materialism'.

=== Multiliteracies ===
Cole has published books on literacy in social and technological contexts. He co-edited Multiliteracies in Motion: Current Theory and Practice with Darren L. Pullen, exploring the evolving concept of literacy in response to technological and social changes since the 1990s, emphasizing a multiliteracies approach that complements new literacies through practical insights and scholarly contributions. In a review for the Australian Journal of Language and Literacy, Glenn Auld commented that this work, "provides a space for pre-service and in-service teachers to engage in the changing nature of the theory and practice associated with a pedagogy of multiliteracies, more than ten years after it was originally articulated." He and Pullen also examined how multiliteracies and technology can improve education and social practices, supporting educators at local and global levels with in their work Multiliteracies and Technology Enhanced Education: Social Practice and the Global Classroom. Additionally, alongside Sam Sellar, he evaluated how accelerationism can shed light on the impact of technology in education, revealing insights into the consequences of technological advancements, especially concerning commercial technology providers and data analytics.

In collaborative research, Cole assessed the effectiveness of teaching critical thinking skills through the Theory of Knowledge (ToK) subject in the International Baccalaureate Diploma Program (DP) for Australian students. He also examined a professional development program's success in implementing multiliteracies and educational leadership principles to enhance literacy education in Australia.

=== Deleuzian perspective ===
Cole has also studied the philosophy of Gilles Deleuze, and was a founder of the knowledge field – Deleuze and Education. Looking into Deleuze's philosophy, he highlighted two roles of affect in education: challenging traditional definitions and exploring affect's resonance in pedagogic acts and group identities. He analyzed Deleuze's shift towards transcendental and immanent materialism in educational theory, exploring its implications while acknowledging his debt to French Marxism, particularly Louis Althusser. Furthermore, he investigated Deleuze and Guattari's immanent materialism, examining everyday life through the lens of traffic jams and oil-related issues, revealing complex intersections between societal dynamics, environmental concerns, and individual experiences.

Cole's 2011 book, Educational Life-forms: Deleuzian Teaching and Learning Practice delved into the philosophy of life in education, demonstrating the emergence of new life-forms through epiphanies, the virtual, and affect. He also assessed the intersection of Deleuzian concepts with educational theory, offering perspectives on literacy and challenging conventional wisdoms in the field through philosophical engagement with Diana Masny in Multiple Literacies Theory: A Deleuzian Perspective, which was called "a productive space for a varied readership" by Brenna Quigley. Later, in Mapping Multiple Literacies: An Introduction to Deleuzian Literacy Studies, they further integrated literacy studies with European philosophy, particularly Multiple Literacies Theory (MLT) and Deleuze's work, framing literacy acquisition as a dynamic process involving diverse modes of presentation and social participation. Cathy Burnett remarked, "Not only does it outline key moves in Deleuzian theory and their application to literacy studies but it also considers the practical implications of such thinking for literacy in education."

== Awards and honors ==
- 1999 – Award for Innovation in Doctoral Study, National Centre for Educational Technology
- 2006 – Teaching Merit Award, University of Tasmania
- 2022 – Best Ph.D. Supervision for Thesis of the Year Award, Western Sydney University

== Bibliography ==
=== Selected books ===
- Multiliteracies in Motion: Current Theory and Practice (2009) ISBN 978-0415801577
- Multiple Literacies Theory: A Deleuzian Perspective (2009) ISBN 978-9087909093
- Multiliteracies and Technology Enhanced Education: Social Practice and the Global Classroom(2009) ISBN 978-1605666730
- Educational Life-forms: Deleuzian Teaching and Learning Practice (2011) ISBN 978-9460916106
- Mapping Multiple Literacies: An Introduction to Deleuzian Literacy Studies (2012) ISBN 978-1441149206
- Traffic Jams: Analysing Everyday Life Through the Immanent Materialism of Deleuze & Guattari (2013) ISBN 978-0615767000
- Education and the Politics of Becoming (2014) ISBN 978-0415741194
- Capitalised Education: An Immanent Materialist Account of Kate Middleton (2014) ISBN 978-1782790365

=== Selected articles ===
- Cole, D. R. (2011). The Actions of Affect in Deleuze: Others using language and the language that we make... Educational Philosophy and Theory, 43(6), 549–561.
- Cole, D. R. (2012). Matter in motion: The educational materialism of Gilles Deleuze. Educational Philosophy and Theory, 44(sup1), 3–17.
- Cole, D. R. (2013). Lost in data space: Using nomadic analysis to perform social science. Deleuze and research methodologies, 219–237.
- Cole, D. R., Ullman, J., Gannon, S., & Rooney, P. (2015). Critical thinking skills in the International Baccalaureate's "Theory of Knowledge" subject: Findings from an Australian study. Australian Journal of Education, 59(3), 247–264.
- Sellar, S., & Cole, D. R. (2017). Accelerationism: A timely provocation for the critical sociology of education. British Journal of Sociology of Education, 38(1), 38–48.
- Cole, D. R. (2024). The praxis and imaginary of Environmental and Sustainability Education in the Capitalocene. The Journal of Environmental Education, 55(1), 1–12.

=== Novels ===
- A Mushroom of Glass, Sid Harta Publishers (2009) ISBN 1-921030-82-8
- A Storybook of Culling, Atmosphere Press (2024) ISBN 9798891324251
