= Widener University =

Private university in Chester, Pennsylvania, US

- Former name: List: The Bullock School for Boys (1821–1846); The Alsop School for Boys (1846–1853); Hyatt's Select School for Boys (1853–1859); Delaware Military Academy (1859–1862); Pennsylvania Military Academy (1862–1892); Pennsylvania Military College (1892–1966); PMC Colleges (1966–1972); Widener College (1972–1979)
- Motto: Mens Sana In Corpore Sano (Sound Mind in Sound Body)
- Type: Private
- Established: 1821; 205 years ago (The Bullock School for Boys); 1862; 164 years ago (College)
- Academic affiliations: CUMU
- Endowment: $122.3 million (2025)
- President: Stacey Robertson
- Faculty: 326 full-time
- Students: 6,464
- Undergraduates: 3,204 (2,790 day, 414 evening)
- Postgraduates: 3,260 (1,598 law students)
- Location: Chester, Pennsylvania, U.S. 39.8607°N 75.3551°W
- Campus: Urban, 108 acres (44 ha)
- Colors: Widener blue & gold
- Nicknames: Pride (introduced in 2006), formerly the Pioneers and the Cadets (when PMC)
- Sporting affiliations: Division III (MAC)
- Mascots: Chester & Melrose (Lions)
- Website: widener.edu
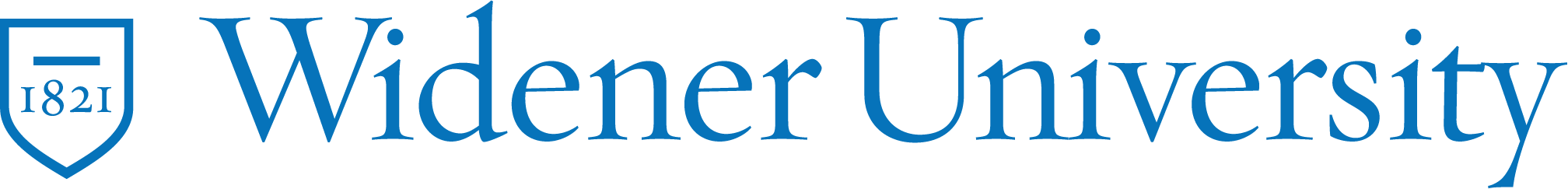

Widener University is a private university in Chester, Pennsylvania, United States. Established in 1821, the university was known as the Pennsylvania Military College until 1972. Widener enrolls approximately 3,500 undergraduate students across six colleges and schools. The university also operates two distinct law schools in Harrisburg, Pennsylvania, and Wilmington, Delaware. Widener is named in honor of Eleanor Elkins Widener.

The university offers associate’s, bachelor’s, master's, and doctoral degrees in a variety of fields across liberal arts, business, and engineering, to nursing and a variety of health and human service professional programs.

== History ==
=== 19th century ===
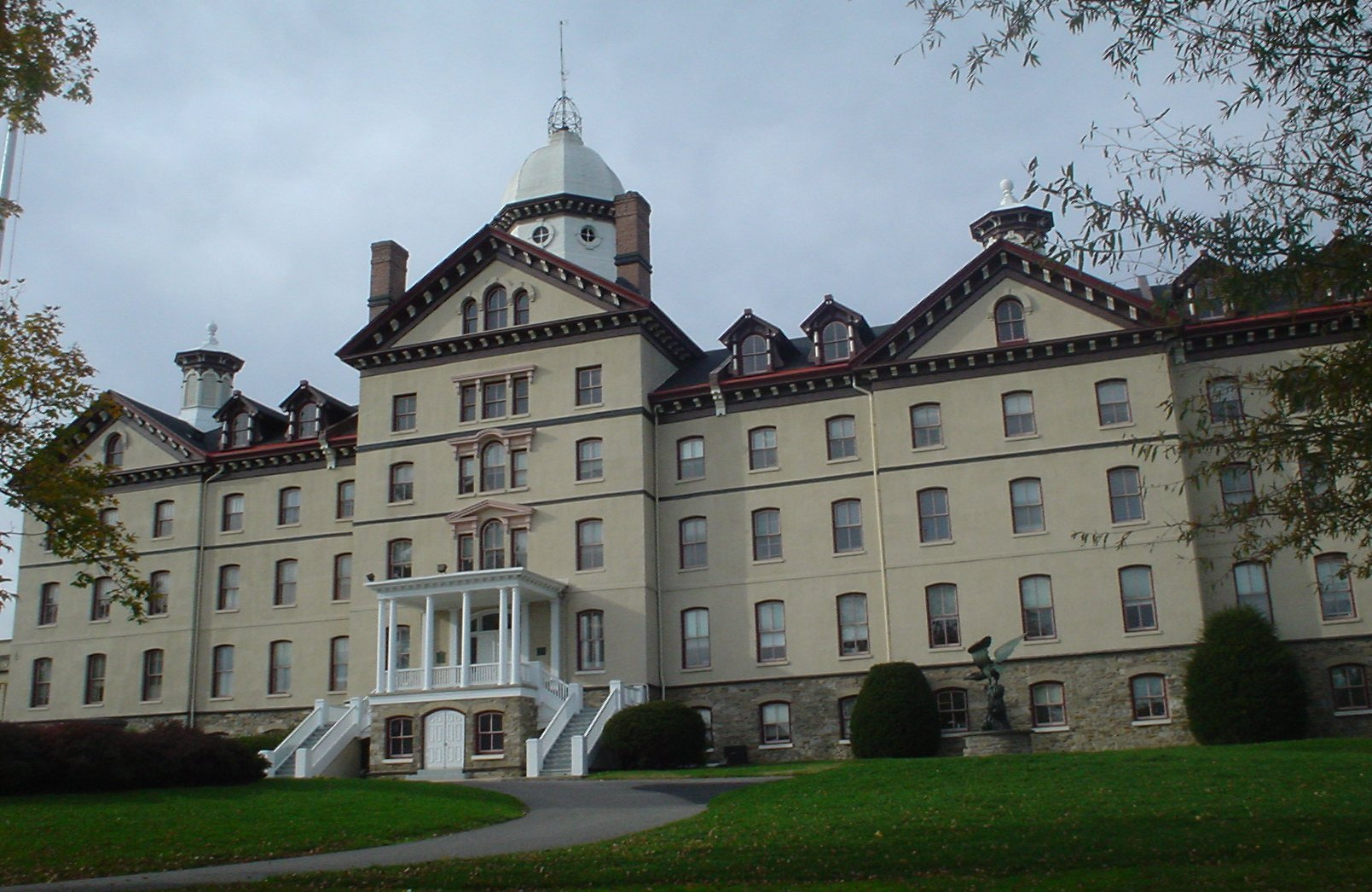
Old Main and Chemistry Building

Widener University was founded in 1821 as the Bullock School for Boys preparatory school in Wilmington, Delaware, by John Bullock. Bullock operated the school until 1846 when it was sold to Samuel Alsop and renamed the Alsop School for Boys. In 1853, the school was sold to Theodore Hyatt and renamed the Hyatt's Select School for Boys, and again in 1859 to the Delaware Military Academy.

In 1862, the school moved to West Chester, Pennsylvania. By act of assembly on April 8, 1862, the Pennsylvania legislature incorporated the school as a university under the name of Chester County Military Academy.

In 1865, the school moved to Chester, Pennsylvania, and occupied the building which would become the Old Main building of the Crozer Theological Seminary. By 1868, the school outgrew the Crozer Old Main building and relocated to its current location.

=== 20th century ===
From 1892 to 1966, the school was known as Pennsylvania Military College (PMC) and was under the direction of General Charles Hyatt. PMC was once one of the nation's senior military colleges. In 1869, Pennsylvania Military College was the first school to have a U.S. Army detail stationed at the school and to receive federal arms for training. In 1904, the school was recognized on the first list of distinguished institutions published by the U.S. War Department. In 1923, "American March King" John Philip Sousa wrote and dedicated "The Dauntless Battalion" march to PMC's President (Colonel Charles E. Hyatt), the faculty and the cadets of PMC. Sousa had been presented with an honorary doctor of music degree by the college in 1920, and he was impressed by the cadet cavalry horsemen.

In 1966, the school changed its name again to PMC Colleges, which incorporated Pennsylvania Military College as well as Penn Morton College, which had a non-military, co-educational curriculum. The school expanded the Chester campus from 25 acres to 90 acres. Graduate programs were introduced in 1966, and female students were first enrolled in 1967.

In 1972, the institution was renamed Widener College to honor the memory of Eleanor Elkins Widener, the maternal grandmother of Fitz Eugene Dixon Jr., a generous supporter of the organization over four decades and a member of the prominent Widener family of Philadelphia. The Corps of Cadets disbanded, although an Army ROTC program was retained. The Widener University School of Law was acquired in 1975, which was split in 2015 to become two separate law schools: one on the Delaware campus and another in Harrisburg – Widener University Commonwealth Law School. In recognition of its comprehensive offerings, Widener College became Widener University in 1979. Today, Widener is a four-campus university offering more than 80 programs of study.

== Architecture ==
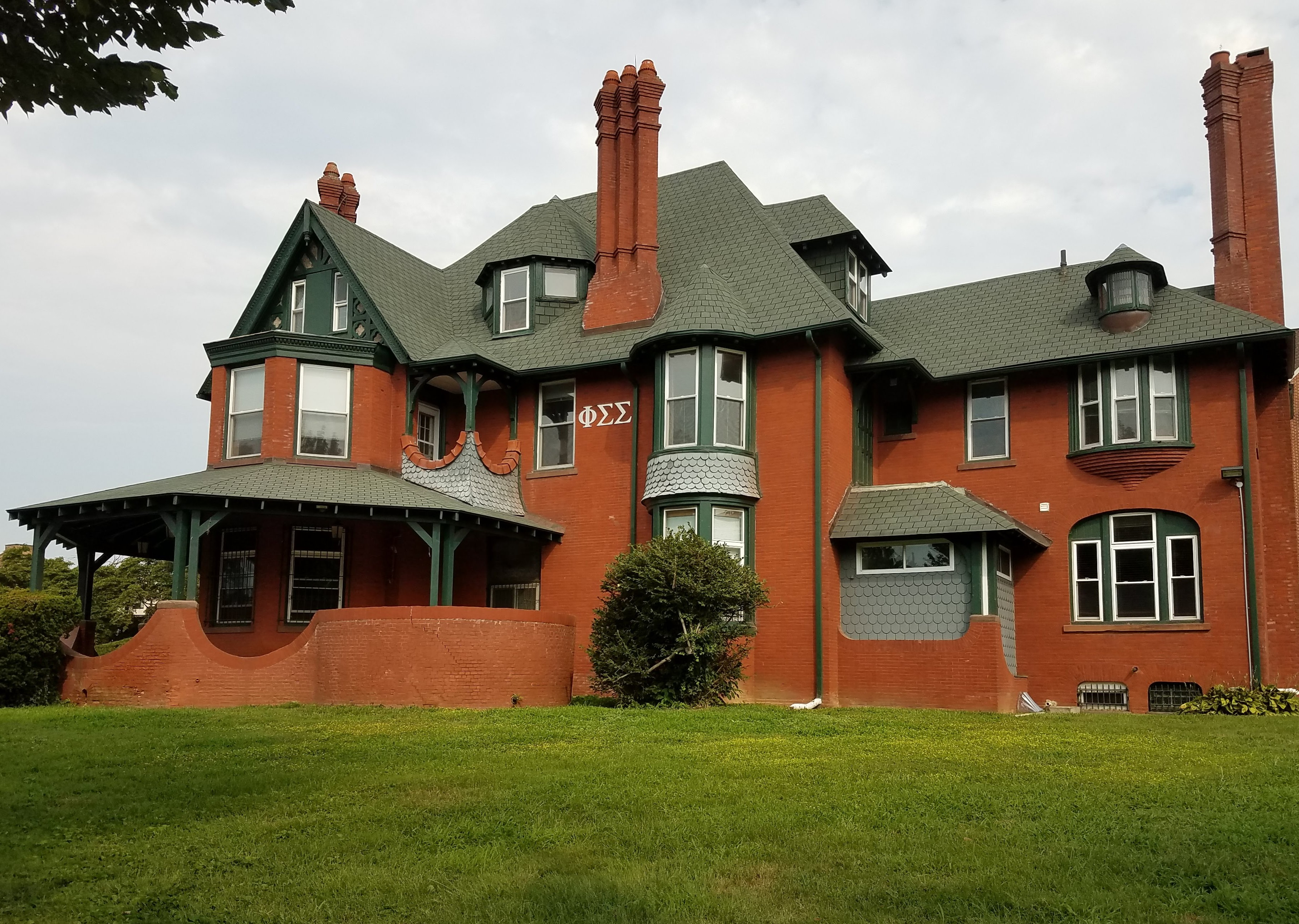
The Manor House on the campus of Widener University built by Jonathan Edwards Woodbridge in 1888

The Manor House was designed and built by Jonathan Edwards Woodbridge in 1888 at 14th and Potter Street. It was a wedding gift to his wife, Louise Deshong, and was originally named "The Louise". It was modeled after the late 19th-century English country manor style and is unique for its hand-made brick construction.

The house was given to the city of Chester as a home for young women. In 1976, Widener University purchased the home for use as a student residence. It later became home to the Phi Sigma Sigma sorority. The home is currently used by Widener University as a student dormitory.

The Old Main and Chemistry Building were listed on the National Register of Historic Places in 1978.

== Campuses ==
Widener consists of three campuses located in Chester, Pennsylvania, Wilmington, Delaware, and Harrisburg, Pennsylvania.

Founded in 1866 after the school moved to Chester, the Chester campus serves all full-time undergraduate day students, part-time adult and continuing studies students, Osher Lifelong Learning Institute (OLLI) students, and graduate students.

Widener School of Law opened in 1976. In July 2015, Widener School of Law, which used to be one school sitting on the Delaware and Harrisburg campuses, split to become Widener University Delaware Law School in Wilmington and Widener University Commonwealth Law School in Harrisburg.

== Academics ==
Widener's academic offerings include over 50 undergraduate majors, 40 minors, and more than 30 graduate programs of study. Widener has an undergraduate student to faculty ratio of 12:1 with 90% of the full-time faculty having doctorates or the highest degree in their field. In addition, 60% of all classes contain less than 20 students.

=== Libraries and museums ===
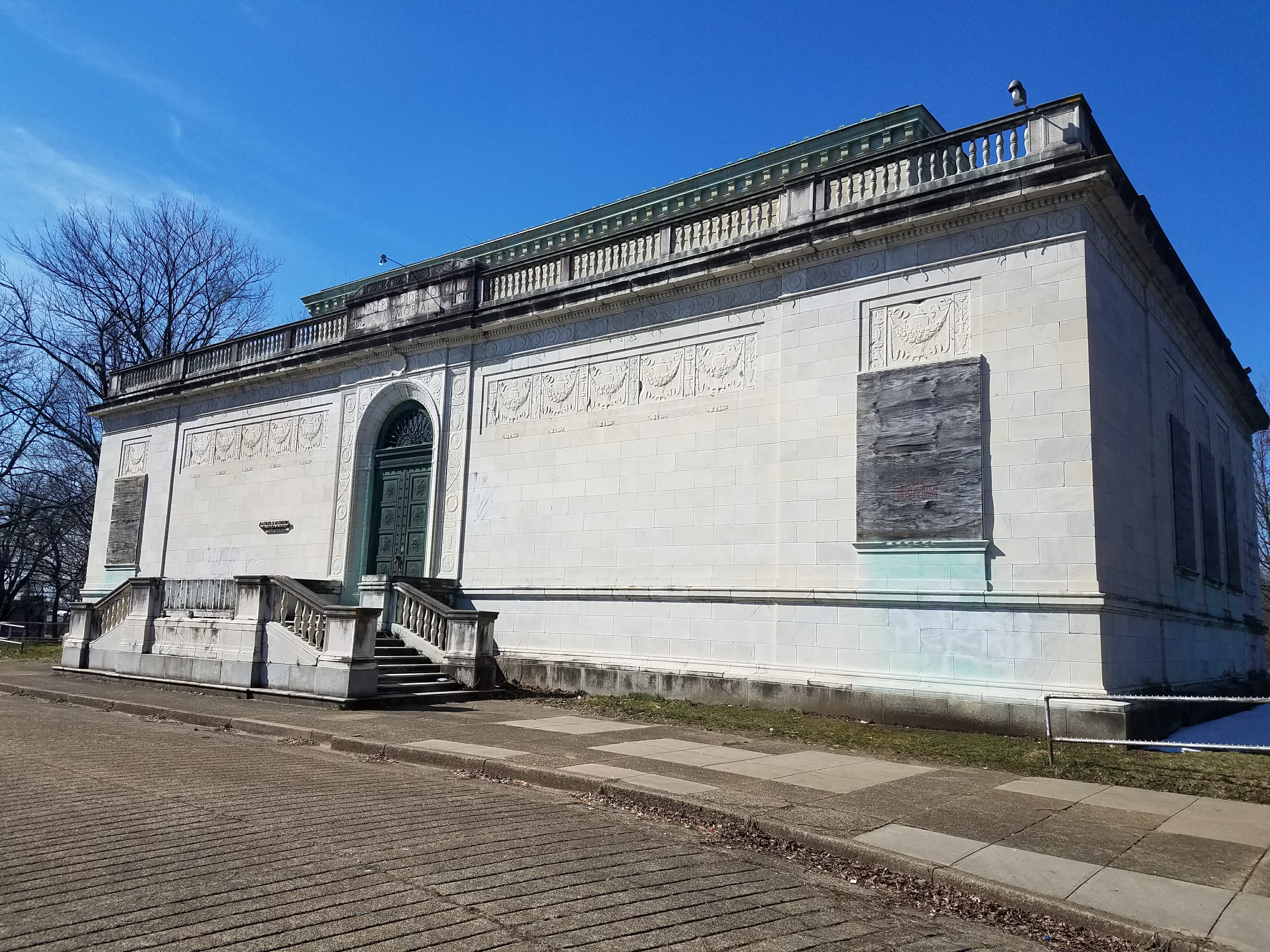
The Deshong Art Museum trust was dissolved in 1984 and the art collection was given to Widener University

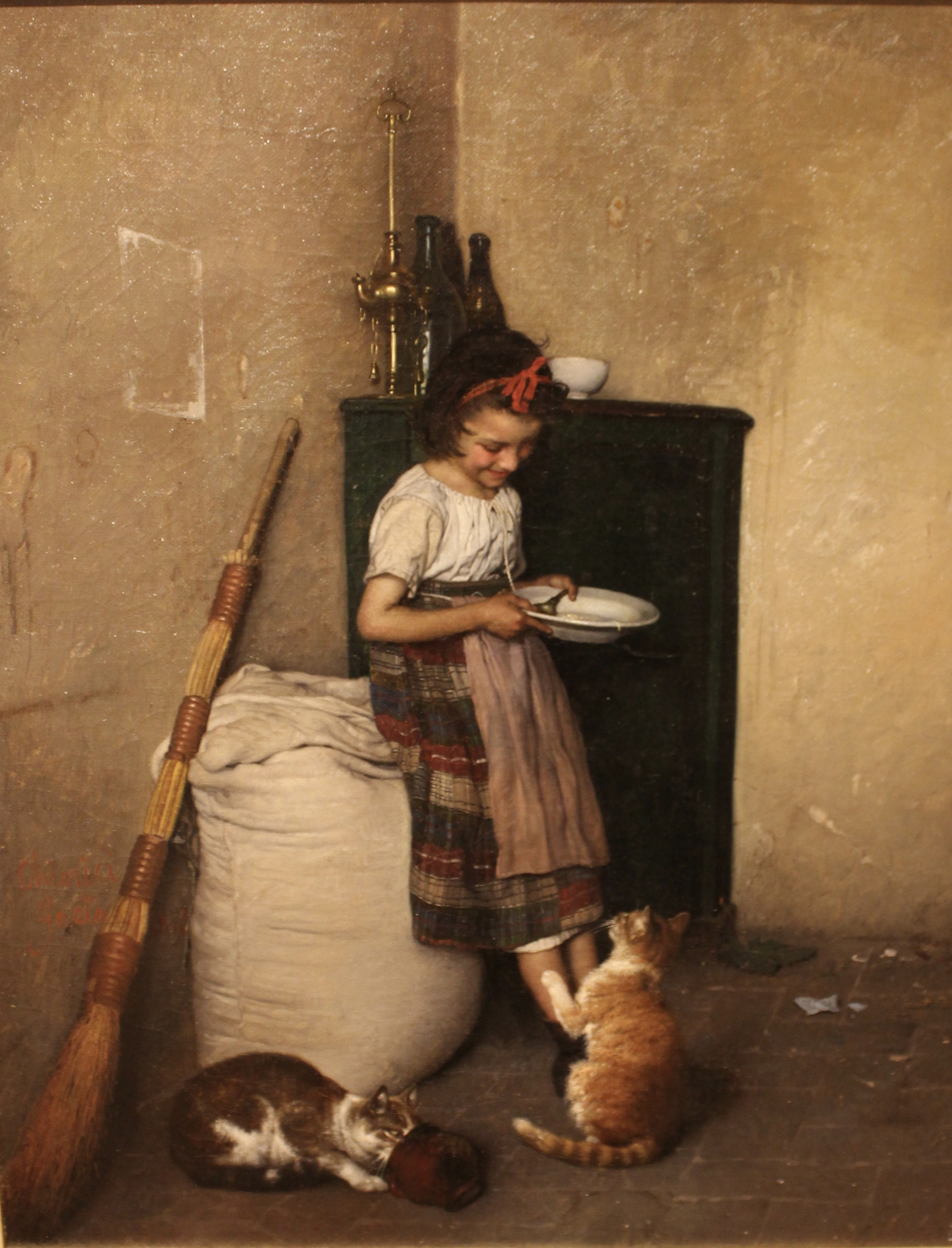
Child Feeding her Pets (1872) by Gaetano Chierici, from the Widener University Alfred O. Deshong Collection

The Wolfgram Memorial Library contains 242,000 volumes, 175,000 microfilms, 12,000 audio-visual materials and 1,960 serial subscriptions.

In 1979, Widener University leased and restored the Deshong Art Museum located on Edgemont Avenue in Chester. The Deshong Art Museum was built in 1914 after the death of the art collector and wealthy industrialist Alfred O. Deshong left his trust and land to the city of Chester. Deshong donated over 300 pieces of art to the museum including carved Japanese ivory figures, Chinese carved hard stone vessels and 19th century American and European paintings.

Over the years, the museum fell into disrepair and in July 1984 the trustees that managed the art museum dissolved the trust. The Asian and impressionistic art collection were given to Widener University and are displayed in their permanent collection.

The PMC Museum highlights the legacy of the Pennsylvania Military Academy of Cadets with exhibits of sabres, uniforms, scrapbooks, newspapers, and yearbooks.

=== Rankings and classifications ===
The 2025 Best Colleges list from U.S. News & World Report ranked Widener as tied for 266th among 434 national universities, with a score of 43 out of 100. It also ranked Widener's undergraduate engineering program tied for 150th among programs whose highest engineering degree is a bachelor's or master's. The 2025 U.S. News & World Report's Best Graduate Schools ranks several of Widener's graduate programs: clinical psychology → #185 (tie), health care law → #80 (tie), Environmental Law → #53 (tie) physical therapy → #122, and social work → #201.

== Student life ==
=== Enrollment ===
Widener enrolls approximately 6,300 total students including 3,600 undergraduate, 1,700 graduate students, and 1,000 law school students. Among full-time undergraduate students, the male/female ratio is about 0.8:1 (44% male, 56% female). 48% of undergraduates choose to live on the Main Campus while the remaining students live off-campus or commute. Approximately 54% of all full-time undergraduates are from Pennsylvania with 45% coming from the rest of the country (predominantly Delaware, Maryland, New Jersey, New York, and Virginia), and 1% of students originating from outside the U.S. The acceptance rate for undergraduate applicants in fall 2013 was 65.5%.

=== Student clubs and events ===
The university has over 100 student clubs. Graduate students are currently not allowed to participate in club sports activities.

TV Club is Widener's student-run television program. WDNR was the student-run campus radio station until the university chose to shut it down in 2014.

=== Fraternity and sorority life ===
Widener has several fraternities and sororities. Approximately 12% of all undergraduates are members.

== Community ==
Widener is one of only 22 colleges that is a member of Project Pericles, an organization promoting social responsibility and addressing civic apathy among students. It is classified as a Community Engagement Institution.

Widener has several initiatives aimed at benefiting the surrounding community. These include:

- Pennsylvania Small Business Development Center – The school opened the center in 2006 to provide consulting and educational programs to local small businesses and entrepreneurs. It is one of only 18 in the state and one of 3 in the Philadelphia region (with Temple University and University of Pennsylvania).
- Philadelphia Speakers Series – Since 2004, Widener has sponsored this series which has had such notable speakers as Steve Wozniak, Henry Kissinger, Walter Cronkite and Dave Barry.
- University Technology Park – A joint project started in 1999 between the university and Crozer-Keystone Health System to foster small business opportunities focusing on health care, science and technology. It currently consists of two buildings (with three more planned) on 20 acres (81,000 m^{2}) and is located directly in between the Main Campus and Crozer-Keystone Medical Center.
- Widener University Observatory – The observatory has free public telescope viewings throughout the school year hosted by the physics and astronomy department.

=== Charter school ===
In 2006, the university established a new charter school near the Chester campus to serve local residents from kindergarten to grade 5. Named the Widener Partnership Charter School, the school utilizes the university's programs in education, social work, nursing, and clinical psychology. This collaboration involves the participation of Widener faculty and students to not only provide educational support but also provide additional assistance outside of school through counseling and health services.

Classes in the charter school started in September 2006, enrolling 50 students in both kindergarten and grade 1. The school continued to add a new grade each year until grade 8 had been reached, surpassing the initial expectations of the project.

=== Chester revitalization project ===
A $50 million revitalization project was started in 2007. The project, named University Crossings, included the addition of a hotel, bookstore, coffee shop, restaurant, and apartments. The project is expected to have an overall economic impact of $1 million to Chester, as well as creating 100 new jobs.

In 2017, Widener University purchased the Taylor Memorial Arboretum in Nether Providence Township about 1 mile north of the Chester campus. The university purchased the site from BNY Mellon bank and plans to use the nature reserve for research and hands-on learning opportunities for citizen science projects.

== Athletics ==
Widener athletics monogram

Widener has 22 varsity teams (11 for men and 11 for women) participating in Division III within the MAC Commonwealth of the Middle Atlantic Conferences (MAC). Formerly known as the Pioneers, their nickname changed to the Pride in the Fall of 2006 after a student poll. Widener sports teams include:

- Men's and Women's varsity: basketball, cross country, lacrosse, soccer, swimming, indoor track and field, outdoor track and field, volleyball and golf
- Men's varsity: baseball and football
- Women's varsity: field hockey and softball
- Co-ed varsity: esports
- Club sports: men's ice hockey, men's and women's rugby, and cheerleading

=== Achievements ===
The football team won the MAC championship in 2012 and made an "Elite 8" appearance in the Division III Playoffs, the ECAC Southwest Bowl in 2011, and the ECAC South Atlantic Bowl in 2005.

Its greatest success has been winning the NCAA Division III National Championship in 1977 and 1981 under long-time coach Bill Manlove and reaching the semi-finals in 1979, 1980, and 2000. Widener also reached the quarterfinals of the tournament in 2012 before losing to eventual NCAA D-III National Champion, Mount Union, by a lopsided 72–17 score. In 2014, the team again won the MAC championship and eventually lost in the NCAA Division III tournament in the "Elite Eight" to Linfield by a score of 45–7. Additionally, Widener football has won 17 MAC championships, the most of any team in the conference. Billy "White Shoes" Johnson played for Widener in the early 70s. He went on to be an all-pro NFL player and was selected to the NFL 75th Anniversary All-Time Team as well as the College Football Hall of Fame.

The men's basketball team has won 15 MAC titles and appeared in the NCAA Division III Tournament 17 times, advancing to the "Sweet 16" in 1987 and 2006, the "Final 4" in 1985, and the championship game in 1978. The men's lacrosse team has appeared in the NCAA Tournament 8 times since 2000 and has won 12 MAC titles since 1996. The men's swimming team has won 12 MAC titles since 1994.

=== Facilities ===
The Schwartz Athletic Center is home to basketball, swimming, indoor track, and volleyball. Opening in 1994, Leslie C. Quick Jr. Stadium seats over 4,000 people and has a turf playing field surrounded by an 8-lane track. The stadium houses the football, soccer, men's lacrosse, and outdoor track & field teams. In addition, Edith R. Dixon Field, opening in 2005, houses the women's field hockey and lacrosse teams. It sports an artificial turf, lighting, and a scoreboard.

In Fall 2019, the Esports Arena in the basement of University Center opened for the inaugural season of the esports program. The arena includes 26 top-of-the-line gaming PCs and serves as both a practice and competition space for the athletes.

The Philadelphia Eagles held its preseason training camp on Widener's campus from 1973 to 1979. The 2006 movie Invincible depicts the campus during the Eagles' 1976 summer training camp.

== Notable alumni ==
As of 2011, there were 59,018 total living alumni.
