= Tamke-Allan Observatory =

Observatory in Tennessee, US

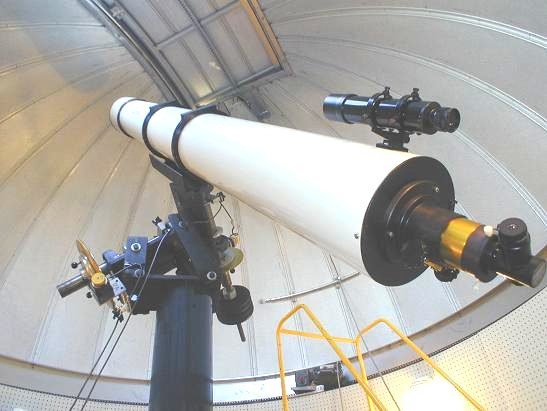
- Organization: Roane State Community College
- Location: Rockwood, Tennessee (USA).
- Coordinates: 35°49.95′N 84°37.07′W
- Altitude: 336 m (1,102 ft)
- Established: 1998
- Website: www.rscc.cc.tn.us/obs/

Telescopes
- (Unnamed): 8 in (200 mm) refractor
- (Unnamed): 12 in (300 mm) reflector
- (Unnamed): Various radio telescopes

Tamke-Allan Observatory (TAO) is an astronomical observatory owned and operated by Roane State Community College. Dedicated in 1998, it is located in Rockwood, Tennessee.

== See also ==
- List of astronomical observatories
