= Ty Ty, Georgia =

- City
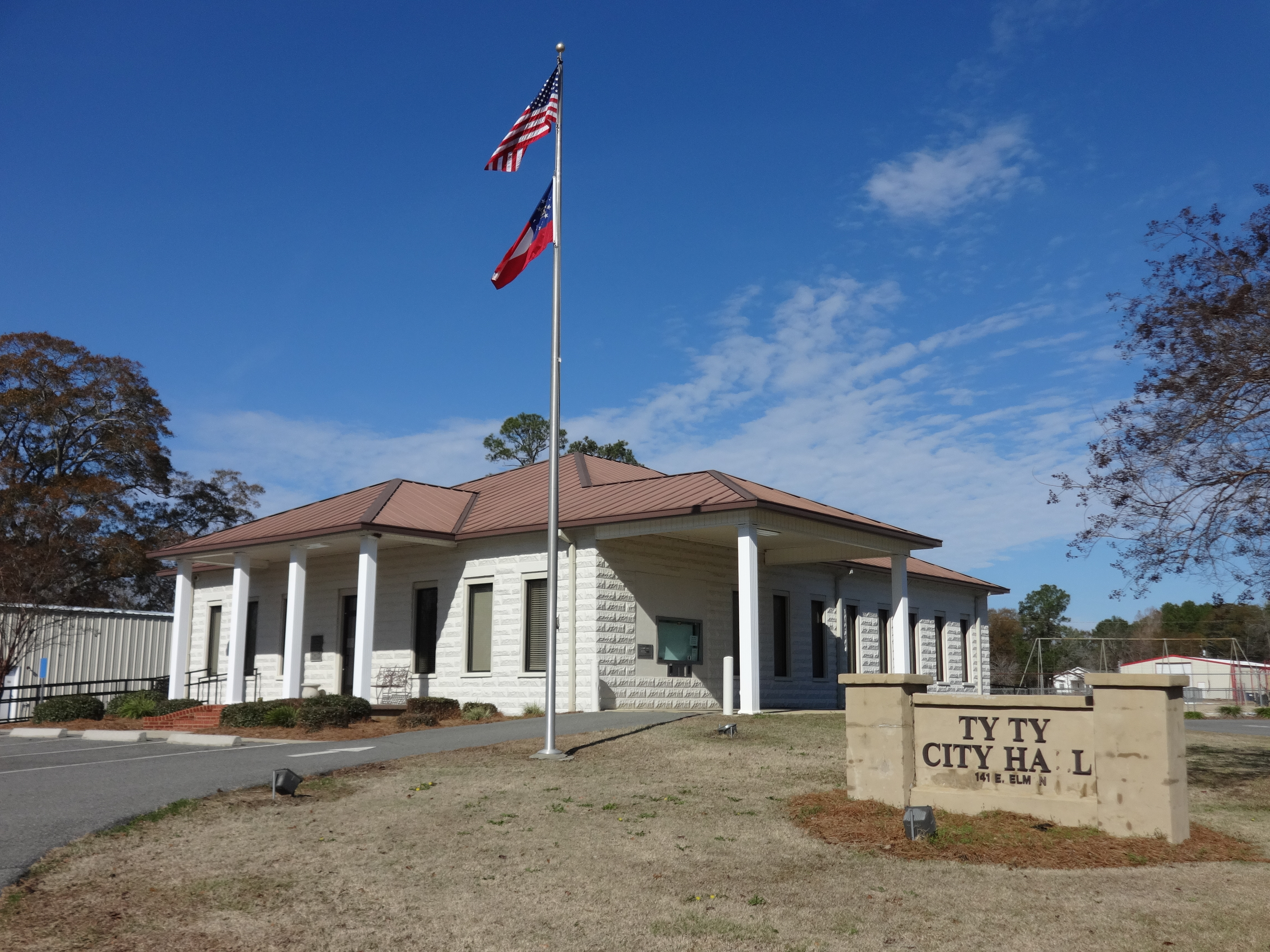
- Ty Ty City Hall

- Location in Tift County and Georgia
- Coordinates: 31°28′17″N 83°38′56″W
- Country: United States
- State: Georgia
- County: Tift

Area
  - Total: 0.80 sq mi (2.07 km^{2})
  - Land: 0.79 sq mi (2.04 km^{2})
  - Water: 0.012 sq mi (0.03 km^{2})
- Elevation: 315 ft (96 m)

Population (2020)
  - Total: 641
  - Density: 813.7/sq mi (314.18/km^{2})
- Time zone: UTC-5 (Eastern (EST))
  - Summer (DST): UTC-4 (EDT)
- ZIP code: 31795
- Area code: 229
- FIPS code: 13-78100
- GNIS feature ID: 0333293
- Website: https://cityoftyty.org/

Ty Ty is a city in Tift County, Georgia, United States. As of the 2020 census, Ty Ty had a population of 641. The community takes its name from nearby Ty Ty Creek which in turn takes its name from the titi trees on its bank.

== Geography ==
Ty Ty is located at 31°28′16″N 83°38′56″W (31.471106, -83.648859).

According to the United States Census Bureau, the city has a total area of 0.8 square miles (2.1 km^{2}), all land.

== Demographics ==
Historical population
| Census | Pop. | Note | %± |
|---|---|---|---|
| 1890 | 353 | | — |
| 1910 | 276 | | — |
| 1920 | 403 | | 46.0% |
| 1930 | 452 | | 12.2% |
| 1940 | 442 | | −2.2% |
| 1950 | 478 | | 8.1% |
| 1960 | 461 | | −3.6% |
| 1970 | 447 | | −3.0% |
| 1980 | 618 | | 38.3% |
| 1990 | 579 | | −6.3% |
| 2000 | 716 | | 23.7% |
| 2010 | 725 | | 1.3% |
| 2020 | 641 | | −11.6% |
U.S. Decennial Census; 1850-1870 1870-1880; 1890-1910 1920-1930; 1940 1950 1960; 1970 1980 1990; 2000 2010

=== Racial and ethnic composition ===
Ty Ty city, Georgia – Racial and ethnic composition Note: the US Census treats Hispanic/Latino as an ethnic category. This table excludes Latinos from the racial categories and assigns them to a separate category. Hispanics/Latinos may be of any race.
| Race / Ethnicity (NH = Non-Hispanic) | Pop 2000 | Pop 2010 | Pop 2020 | % 2000 | % 2010 | % 2020 |
|---|---|---|---|---|---|---|
| White alone (NH) | 454 | 413 | 317 | 63.41% | 56.97% | 49.45% |
| Black or African American alone (NH) | 235 | 252 | 203 | 32.82% | 34.76% | 31.67% |
| Native American or Alaska Native alone (NH) | 0 | 0 | 2 | 0.00% | 0.00% | 0.31% |
| Asian alone (NH) | 1 | 7 | 2 | 0.14% | 0.97% | 0.31% |
| Native Hawaiian or Pacific Islander alone (NH) | 0 | 0 | 0 | 0.00% | 0.00% | 0.00% |
| Other race alone (NH) | 0 | 1 | 0 | 0.00% | 0.14% | 0.00% |
| Mixed race or Multiracial (NH) | 0 | 8 | 17 | 0.00% | 1.10% | 2.65% |
| Hispanic or Latino (any race) | 26 | 44 | 100 | 3.63% | 6.07% | 15.60% |
| Total | 716 | 725 | 641 | 100.00% | 100.00% | 100.00% |

=== 2020 census ===
As of the 2020 United States census, there were 641 people, 260 households, and 202 families residing in the city.

== Notable people ==
Ty Ty is the birthplace and home of Darby Cottle Veazey, a two-time All-American softball player and one of only two female athletes to have their number retired at Florida State University. Cottle was named the USOC "Best Amateur Softball Player" in the nation in 1981 and later won the prestigious Broderick Award.

Ty Ty is also the hometown of bass singer James “Big Chief” Wetherington, who sang with many gospel music quartets, most notably The Statesmen.
