= Israeli Astronomical Association =

Nonprofit organization

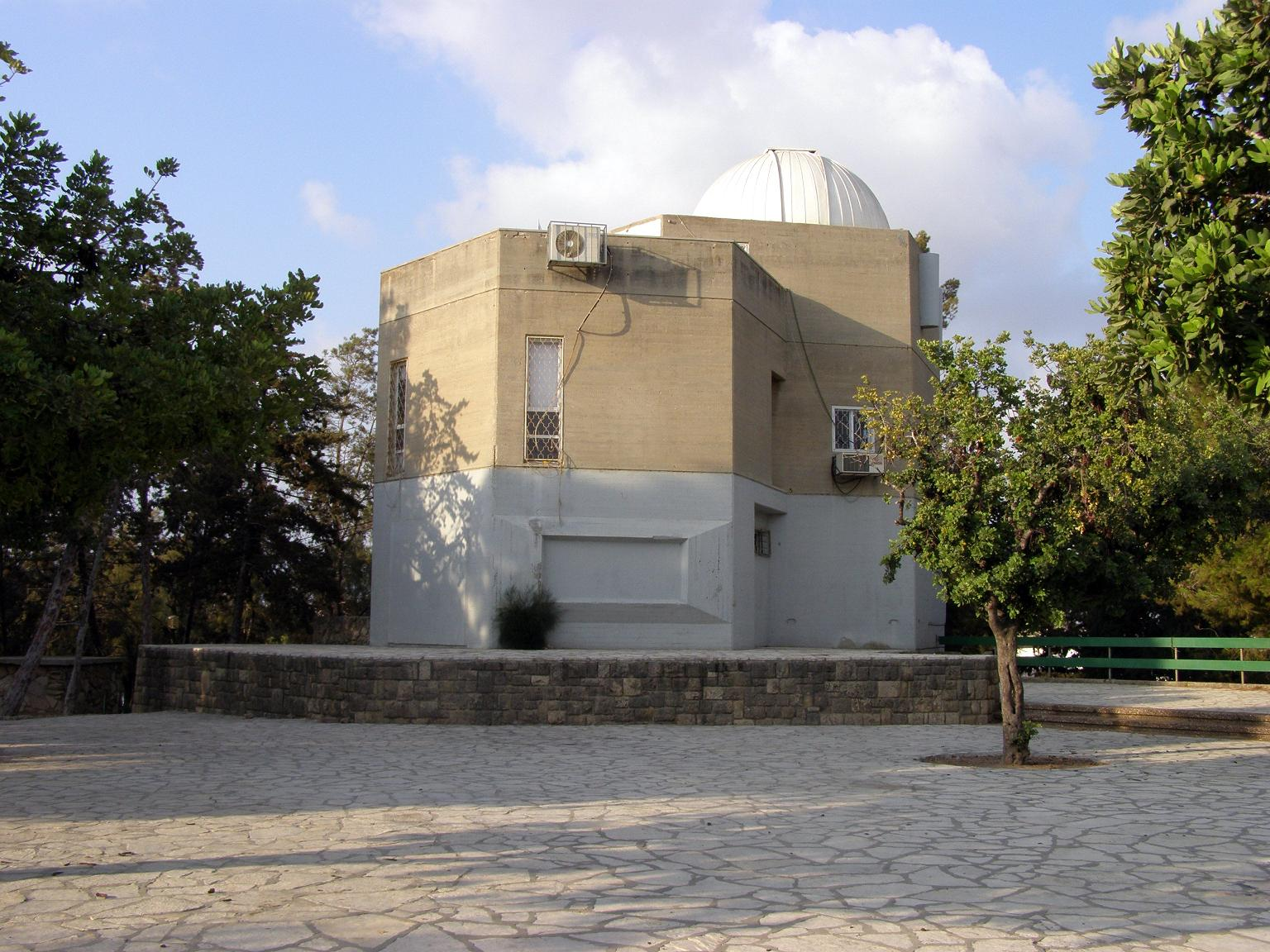
The Givatayim Observatory operated by the IAA

The Israeli Astronomical Association (IAA) is an Israeli nonprofit organization. Its purpose is to deepen and distribute the awareness for the field of astronomy among the Israeli public.

== History ==
The Israeli Astronomical Association was established first as an amateur fellowship on May 28, 1951, by a group of astronomy fans immigrating from Germany and Czechoslovakia, among them Dr Heilbruner and Dr Zaichik. Dr Zaichik was the first chairman of the association and kept his position for many years until his retirement due to personal health matters.

The decision to make the association national was made in 1953 in the chamber of David Ben-Gurion, the country's prime minister, in order to promote astronomical knowledge and related science fields in the newly formed state of Israel.

The association was then allocated a territory in Givat Ram in Jerusalem by the Israel Land Administration. The same area was later designated for the development of the Hebrew University of Jerusalem. A planetarium was built for the exclusive use of the association with the financial help of the Williams family from the Palestine bank (later was known as Bank Leumi, Israel National Bank) in 1956.

The main goal of the association was—and still is—the distribution knowledge of the astronomy amongst the Israeli public. This purpose is carried out by organizing conventions, courses, lectures, star parties and observations, as well as publishing the magazine Astronomy (previously All the Stars of Light and The Stars in their Month). This magazine is one-of-a-kind in Hebrew ever since.

In 1953 the association built an observatory in the suburb of Talabia in Jerusalem and started branching all over the country—Tel Aviv, Ramat Gan, Haifa and the Galilee. These branches are no longer active and others will take their place. All the activities of its members were made and are still being made fully voluntarily.

Due to a temporal setback on the activities of the association and the transference of its center of gravity to Givatayim, The Hebrew University of Jerusalem took hold of the planetarium building in 1986, which by then was in the university's expanding territory. The takeover included Albert Einstein's telescope which was given to the association in 1962 from the "Ben Shemen" school. The university turned most of the planetarium site into its office spaces, which brought the association and the Williams family to file two lawsuits against The Hebrew University of Jerusalem (1574/98, 8514/90). These lawsuits were supposed to return the management of the planetarium back to the hands of the association as well as using the planetarium for astronomical purposes. Unfortunately it was decided that in spite of the forceful take-over by the university, the observatory will remain in their custody. Currently the association does not have the resources to maintain the battle and neither the observatory nor the planetarium in Givat Ram do function in their designated purposes.

In 1967, following the Six-Day War, the association inaugurated the Givatayim Observatory in the city of Giv'atayim in the center of Israel. Giv'atayim was the choice of preference due to the height of the place allocated for the observatory, far above the sea level and in distance from its humidity (relative to the surroundings at the time). The observatory was established with the funds of the municipality of Giv'atayim, the association and donations from abroad raised by the observatory manager at the time, Eng. Yossi Fooks. For 25 years the observatory was solely managed by the association. Dince 1994 it had co-management with the municipality of Giv'atayim. The chairmen of the association were sometimes the managers of the observatory at the same time. Among them: Haim Levi, Dr. Noah Brosch (presently the director of the Wise Observatory of Tel Aviv University), Dr. Isaac Shlosman (presently Astrophysics Professor at the University of Kentucky), Ilan Manulis (presently the director of the Technoda Observatory) and Dr. Igal Patel that was the manager of the observatory for over 20 years (ever since 1987). Nadav Rotenberg was the Chair for 10 years, and the current Chair is Dr. Amit Shraga.

== Main activities ==
The association operates as a nonprofit organization with hundreds of members. The majority of the activities are focused on the observatory in Giv'atayim. Nevertheless, the association holds country wide astronomical activities with organized observations on the south side of Israel, astronomical weekends, conventions of astronomy and seminars.

The journal of the association Astronomy is published several times a year. The association also publishes a yearly almanac with all the astronomical phenomena expected to be seen in Israeli skies. A guideline for the association is that all of its members—including the functionaries—are all volunteers. The activities of the association are financed by membership fees (as for the year 2014, membership fees are 100 NIS per year), incomes raised from the activities and from time to time it is also supported by the ministry of science and other donating bodies (the most recent is the Pelephone company on 1999).

The association holds ties with similar groups abroad and with national as well as international research institutions.

== Divisions ==
During the past as well as present, the association holds observation divisions. The two prominent divisions are:

- The Meteors Division, headed by Anna Levin, this division holds meteors observations and reports to the International Meteors Organization regularly. On 2008 a seminar was held for meteor observing and new observers were trained, increasing the number of members from 3 to 10. The division also holds lectures on the topic of meteors twice a year and publishes a forecast of meteor showers on the quarterly journal of the association and on the web.
- The Variable Stars Division, headed by Ofer Gabzo, this division reached the peak of its activities during the 90s when it had 5 observing members which regularly sent thousands of observations (magnitude estimates of variable stars) per year to the American Association of Variable Star Observers (an international associations despite its name). In 1992 the head of the division, Ofer Gabzo, set a world record with over 22,000 observations in one year.

Nowadays, only Ofer Gabzo holds the relevant knowledge inside the association.
