= Jiamusi University =

Provincial public university in Jiamusi, Heilongjiang, China

Coordinates: 46.786463°N 130.363501°E

- 佳木斯大学
- Type: Public
- Established: 1947
- Location: Jiamusi, Heilongjiang, China
- Campus: Urban
- Website: en.jmsu.edu.cn

Jiamusi University (Chinese: 佳木斯大学; pinyin: Jiāmùsī dàxué) is a provincial public university in Jiamusi, northeastern Heilongjiang, China. The university is affiliated with the Province of Heilongjiang. Geographically, it is the earliest university to observe the sunrise everyday in China.

The school was founded in 1947. In 1995, then Jiamusi Medical College (佳木斯医学院), then Jiamusi Engineering College (佳木斯工学院), then Jiamusi Teachers Vocational School (佳木斯师范专科学校), and then municipal Jiamusi University were merged to establish the current form of Jiamusi University. After 2000, Jiamusi Municipal Grain Workers Secondary Vocational School (佳木斯市粮食职工中等专业学校), Fujin Normal School (富锦师范学校), and Heilongjiang Provincial Polytechnic School (黑龙江省理工学校) were merged to the school.
