= David Cole Observatory =

Astronomical observatory in Hyannis, Massachusetts

David B. Cole Observatory
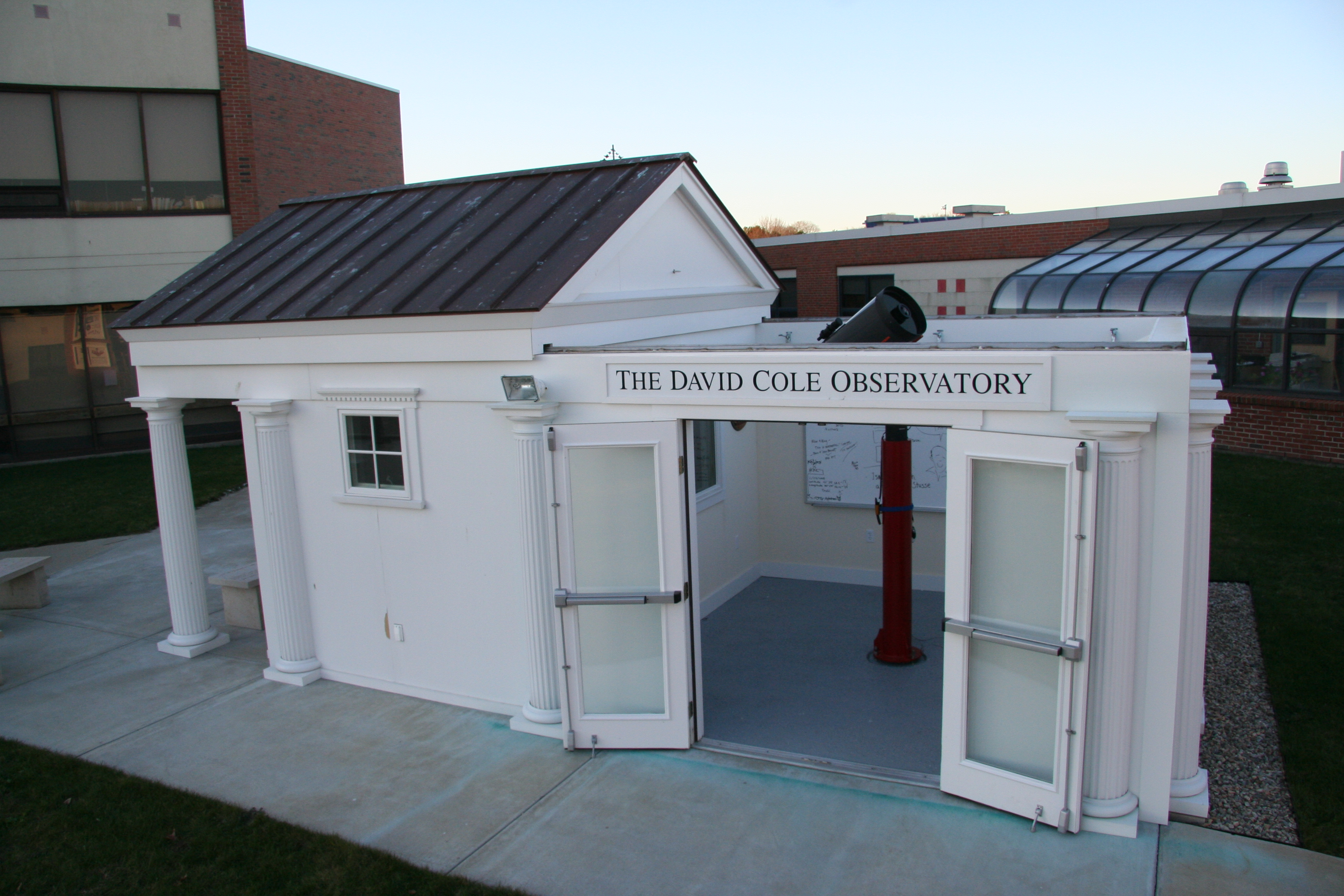
- A view of the observatory inside the Cobb Astro Park
- Organization: Barnstable High School
- Location: Hyannis, Massachusetts
- Coordinates: 41°39′18.30″N 70°19′17.06″W
- Altitude: 54 feet (16 m)
- Established: 2007

Telescopes
- Celestar 8 inch: Schmidt–Cassegrain
- Celestar 11 inch: Schmidt–Cassegrain
- Celestron 11" CPC telescope: Schmidt–Cassegrain
- CGE 14 14 inch German Equatorial Mount: Schmidt–Cassegrain
- Meade LX200 10 inch: Schmidt–Cassegrain
- Orion SkyQuest XT12 IntelliScope: 12 inch Dobsonian
- Coronado Solar Telescope: 60 mm

The David B. Cole Observatory is an educational astronomical observatory owned and operated by Barnstable High School. It is named after David Cole, the longtime trustee of the trust fund of Enoch Cobb. The observatory itself houses one telescope, while there are mounts outside the building for four more telescopes. The observatory is also located within the grounds of the high school, thus allowing for more access to the building for its students.

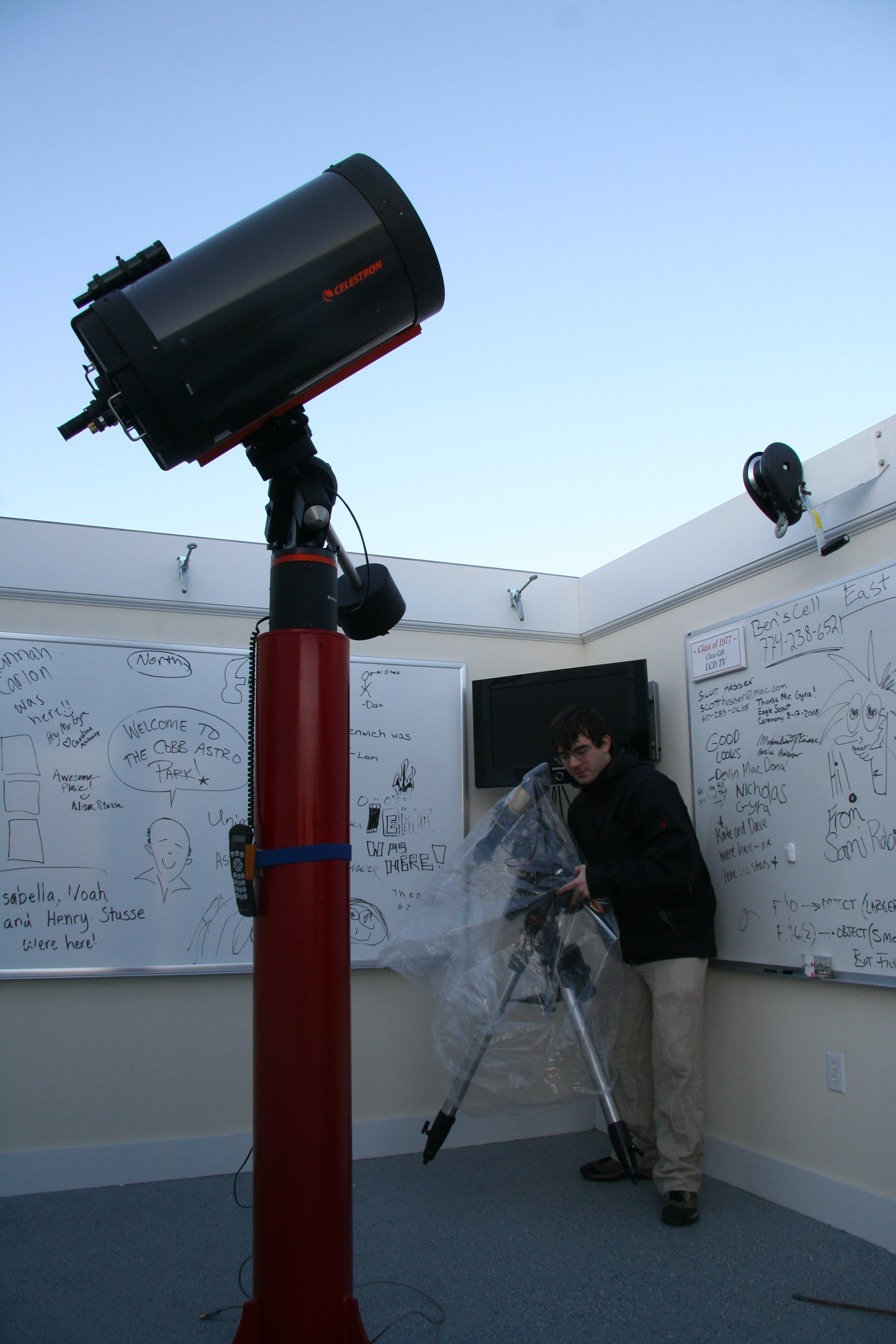
The main telescope at the observatory

== See also ==
- List of astronomical observatories
