= David G. Coles =

Canadian lawyer

David G. Coles KC
- Born: Halifax, Nova Scotia
- Education: Dalhousie University (BA, LLB)
- Occupation: Lawyer
- Relatives: Allen Linden (uncle)

David G. Coles, QC (born in Halifax, Nova Scotia) is a Canadian lawyer. He earned his B.A. from Dalhousie University in 1981. He then received his LL.B. in 1984, also from Dalhousie. He was admitted to the Nova Scotia Bar in 1985.

Coles has appeared on appeals to the Supreme Court of Canada on four separate occasions and participated in over 170 reported decisions. His practice includes representing a number of institutional clients including Canadian Broadcasting Corporation, Canadian National Railways, Meridian Construction Inc., National Bank, Nova Scotia Power and Amica. He appears regularly in the Supreme Courts and Courts of Appeal of Nova Scotia, New Brunswick and Prince Edward Island. His practice includes class actions/mass tort work.

Coles is a partner and practises in the areas of Business Litigation, Civil Litigation, Estate Litigation, Employment Law, Media Law, and Construction Law. He is the Chairman of the firm's litigation section.

Coles' uncle Allen Linden is a prominent judge of the Canadian Federal Court of Appeal.

Coles is a part-time lecturer at the University of King's College, Halifax.

== Education ==
1981 Dalhousie University, B.A.

1984 Dalhousie University, LL.B.

== Employment ==
1975-85 Correctional Services - Department of Attorney General (Summer Employment/Part-time/Full-time); Research Officer/Probation Officer 1985-91 Articling Clerk/Associate - Boyne Clarke, Dartmouth, Nova Scotia 1991–present Litigation Partner (Commercial Law/Media Law) - Boyne Clarke, Dartmouth, Nova Scotia

== Bar activities ==
Member Construction Law Subsection Canadian Bar Association Member (Past Provincial Chairman) National Media Law Subsection Canadian Bar Association Member Ad IDEM

== Honours ==
2005 King's Counsel

== Publications ==
Numerous articles on freedom of expression and media law related topics in national legal publications The Public Inebriate in Provincial Correctional Institutions - 1973 to 1975 - Department of Attorney General A History of the Administration of Jails in the Province of Nova Scotia - Nova Scotia Criminal Justice Communications Project Blueprint for Provincial Assumption of Responsibility for Correctional Institutions - Correctional Services - Department of Attorney General

== Appearances ==
He has appeared in all levels of courts in the province and in four separate cases (involving numerous hearings) before the Supreme Court of Canada.
