= Beakerhead =

Arts and science festival in Alberta, Canada

- Genre: Science education
- Location: Calgary, Alberta, Canada
- Inaugurated: September 11, 2013; 13 years ago
- Previous event: November 6, 2026-November 8, 2026
- Organizer: Telus Spark Science Centre (since 2022)
- Website: www.sparkscience.ca/beakerhead

Beakerhead is a multi-day festival held every September in Calgary, Alberta, Canada that combines the arts/culture sectors with the science/technology sectors to encourage collaboration, innovation, and science education through interactive art exhibits, engineered installations, entertainment, and workshops – drawing international presenters and attendees. Beakerhead also includes a year-round education and outreach initiative.

Through public art installations, science on the streets, and community and school competitions, Beakerhead promotes the progression of education at the intersection of arts, science, and engineering. It was started with founder's Mary Ann Moser and Jay Ingram and a full-time team of four: Jasmine Palardy, Michelle Htun, Hanan Chebib and Claudia Bustos. Since its inception in 2013, Beakerhead has become one of Calgary's largest collaborations, bringing together students, artists, scientists, engineers, Calgarians, and tourists in indoor and outdoor public spaces and venues throughout Calgary. Presenters have included: former astronaut and musician Chris Hadfield, ArcAttack, Zimoun, Bee Kingdom Glass, Wu Tang Clan's GZA, Dr. Chris Emdin, MondoSpider, El Pulpo Mecanico, Amanda Parer, and CompressorHead.

Since 2022, Beakerhead has partnered with the Telus Spark Science Centre.

== September Festival ==
=== Past Programs ===
- Four-to-Six: an entertaining daily exhibit full of hands-on encounters with robots, music, street experiments, edible anatomy, science busking, and a variety of artists and performers.
- Beakerbites (formerly Engineered Eats): Food and drink meet science at participating restaurants and bars featuring Beakerhead-themed creations. Themes: Eggs (2015), Milk (2016), Barley (2017) and Canola (2018).

=== On-going Programs ===
- Workshops and Tours: Beakerhead hosts workshops, talks, screenings, and readings for guest artists, engineer academics, and the general public.
- The Spectacle: An evening event featuring dance parties, performances, and indoor and outdoor installations. Previous events have included crane riding, massive 3D projections, inflatable artworks, science demonstrations, a human-sized hamster wheel, fire breathing dragons and interactive art.

== Beakerhead Year-Round ==
=== Past Programs ===
- Beakerhead Big Bang: an interactive public art proposal and residency program that helped support the creation of new artwork, which would debut in Calgary during the five-day long Beakerhead event every September. The program invited artists, architects, scientists, and other creative professionals to propose an interactive public art installation that incorporated science, technology, and collective experience. The selected projects were funded by Beakerhead and built in Calgary over the course of a year, beginning with a weeklong planning residency hosted at Banff Centre for Arts and Creativity.The inaugural Big Bang Residency was awarded to the BASS SHIP by Beama. The BASS Ship, which stands for Beama Applied Sciences Sector Ship, is a 30-foot high interactive audio-visual spaceship that invites participants to explore ideas about non-verbal communication, culture, and civilization.
- SciComm Lab: for over 10 years, the co-founders of Beakerhead, Jay Ingram and Mary Anne Moser, have hosted a science and communications program at the Banff Centre for Arts and Creativity where participants could learn to present science with a compelling, audience-focused approach. Previously, the SciComm labs have been intensive two-week summer courses, in 2017, Beakerhead extended the program and offering courses across Canada. Previous course sessions included "Elevator Pitch," "Personalizing the Impersonal," "Audience-Focused Communications," and "Improv."

=== School Programs ===
- Beakerhead works with the kindergarten to grade 12 education system to provide curriculum-related experiences that allow students to explore the combination of both artistic and scientific skills. In 2015, Beakerhead worked with 24,200 students in 104 participating schools. The current school programs include field trips, school visits, and an annual Ingenuity Challenge and the Science Genius Rap battles.

== Past Events ==
=== 2013 ===
The first edition of Beakerhead took place September 11–15, 2013. The main events and attractions included:

- Sustainival: The world's first green carnival and midway, powered by vegetable oils, wind, solar, and other forms of renewable energy.
- Four-to-Six: Stephen Avenue Walk between 1 Street SE and 4 Street SW was transformed into an entertaining exhibit featuring street-based science experiments and robots making art.
- Engineered Eats: Dining became an experimental experience where food and drink met science at Beakerhead's participating restaurants and bars.
- Shell International Engineering Competition: Engineering students from across Canada, the United States, and Europe competed in a 24-hour challenge of ingenuity.
- Theatre and music performances including the Calgary Philharmonic Orchestra, DieSpace 3.0, and i-ROBOT Theatre.
- Catharsis Catapults: Teams designed and built catapults to toss love-to-hate items.
- Beakernight: An evening featuring dance parties, performances, and outdoors and indoor installations, including a nine-foot laser cat and musical tesla coils that shot bolts of lightning.

=== 2014 ===
The second edition of Beakerhead took place September 10–14, 2014. The main events and attractions included:

- Little Big Street: A miniature neighbourhood featuring interactive structures such as a human-sized nest and an inflatable giant lotus.
- Laser Cat: A 16-foot engineered art installation from Art Directors Club in the United States and Hungry Castle in Barcelona with an outdoor dance floor and videographic light and art.
- Four-to-Six: Stephen Avenue Walk between 1 Street SE and 4 Street SW was transformed into an entertaining exhibit featuring street-based science experiments and robots making art.
- Engineered Eats: Dining becomes an experimental experience when food and drink meet science at Beakerhead's participating restaurants and bars.
- Theatre performances including Ghost River Theatre's adaptation of Ray Bradbury's Tomorrow's Child.
- The Periodic Table: A sustainable energy ferris-wheel-turned-dining-room where diners can enjoy a meal created by chef Nicole Gomes, a contestant on Top Chef Canada.
- Net Blow-Up: A self-supporting, climbable structure designed by three artists from Vienna, Austria, called Numen/For Use.
- Beakernight: An evening featuring dance parties, performances, and outdoors and indoor installations including a two-storey high, fire-breathing octopus from El Pulpo Mecanico.

=== 2015 ===
The third edition of Beakerhead took place September 16–20, 2015. The main events and attractions included:

- Sandbox of Human Ingenuity: A giant sandbox featuring The Claw, a larger-than-life sized version of the classic arcade game.
- A performance from science advocate and rapper GZA of Wu-Tang Clan.
- A String (Theory) of Incredible Encounters: An outdoor gallery of engineered art installations, including Intrude, five huge bunnies designed by Australian artist Amanda Parer in Central Memorial Park, and the Fabulist, an interplanetary inflatable designed by Bee Kingdom Glass.
- The Gorgeous Libation: A one-night-only pop-up bar where patrons could explore the history and future of energy.
- The Seven Wonderers: A night of science storytelling led by John Rennie, former editor-in-chief of Scientific American; Rose Eveleth, host and producer of Meanwhile in the Future; Torah Kachur, national science columnist for CBC Radio, Jennifer Gardy, regular guest host of the Nature of Things for CBC TV; Sarah Chow, science comedian and former host of This Week at UBC; Raj Bhardwaj, medical columnist for CBC Radio; and Ivan Semeniuk, science reporter for the Globe and Mail.
- Beakernight: An evening featuring dance parties, performances, and outdoors and indoor installations including a fire-spitting skee ball and large-scale 3D projections.

=== 2016 ===
The fourth edition of Beakerhead took place September 14–18, 2016. The main events and attractions included:

- Rock 'n Roll History of Space Exploration: Jay Ingram and his band, the Cosmonauts, led the audience on a visual and musical journey of space exploration.
- Four-to-Six: Stephen Avenue Walk between 1 Street SE and 3 Street SW was transformed into an entertaining exhibit featuring mobile contraptions and a cornstarch walk.
- BASS Ship: A 30-foot interactive audio-visual spaceship installation designed by Beama.
- Tentacles: Giant octopus tentacles designed by UK artists Filthy Luker and Pedro Estrellas emerge from the McGill Block.
- The Seven Wonderers: A night of science storytelling led by Nathaniel Barr, a professor of creativity and creative thinking at Sheridan College; Kori Czuy, a PhD student at the University of Calgary studying sensual mathematics; Gill Deacon, a CBC Radio host, ward-winning broadcaster, and bestselling author; Dr. Christopher Emdin, an associate professor at Columbia University and a leading researcher in hip-hop, science, and education; Randy Frank, executive director of research and development at 3M Canada; Seema Goel, an artist in residence at the Faculty of Science at the University of Manitoba; Kristofer Kelly-Frere, a strategist with the Civic Innovation Project at the City of Calgary.
- Beakernight: An evening featuring dance parties, performances, and outdoors and indoor installations including a can-crushing cow and human-sized hamster wheel.

=== 2017 ===
The fifth edition of Beakerhead took place September 13–17, 2017. The main events and attractions included:

- Snakes and Ladders: A segment of 14 sites focusing on the ups and downs of invention in celebration of Canada 150.
- Serpent Mother: Created by San Francisco’s Flaming Lotus Girls, Serpent Mother is a fire-breathing installation at Beakerhead, 168 feet long and with 40 pillars of fire.
- Scent Bar: A blindfolded sensory performance experience based on our sense of smell, located at Chophouse.
- Spectral Illuminations II: Site-specific projections projected on the surface of Memorial Park Library, presented by EMMEDIA Gallery and Production Society and the Calgary Public Library.

=== 2018 ===
The sixth edition of Beakerhead took place September 19–23, 2018. The main events and attractions included:

- Treeter Totter: A giant see-saw exhibit that teaches users about climate change, with deciduous trees on opposite ends of a wooden plank that raise and lower according to movement, demonstrating human's ability to change the course of nature.
- Becons: A sculpture made of recycled materials by Alberta artist Max Streicher, educating individuals on the Dung Beatle.
- 30 ft high Tesla Coils connected to a piano that you can play.
- An eye-catching balloon installation called "Dreams Never Die" created by Maria Galura.

=== 2019 ===
The seventh edition of Beakerhead took place from September 18-22, 2019. The main events and attractions included:

- The Long View Polar Bear, created by Don Kennell. A 35 foot sculpture made out of car hoods to represent the greatest threat to polar bears: climate change. At the spectacle The Long View Polar Bear was projection mapped by AZMA.
- Paraluna, by Christopher Schardt. A mesmerizing array of LED lights spinning to make beautiful images for the audience lying on the grass below.
- A visit from True North Absurdities, a local artist team who brought with them two fire-breathing, interactive sculptures: Notorious B.A.D. and Trippity Twitchit.
- Amanita Arcade, an interactive larger-than-life, mushroom-shaped memory game created by Shadow Puppet Productions.
- The Portal by The PRGM, an interactive portal lit by LED lights and fire.
- Performances by MakeFashion and Le Cirque de la Nuit.

=== 2020-2021 ===
Beakerhead was not held in 2020 due to the COVID-19 pandemic.

In June 2021, that year's edition was likewise announced as cancelled but on September 25, Beakerhead partnered with the Calgary International Film Festival; a giant light-up marionette named David was showcased climbing the Devon Tower at Eau Claire.

=== 2022-2024 ===
The eighth edition of Beakerhead took place from September 23-25, 2022. This was the first time the event was partnered with Telus Spark.

The ninth edition took place from September 14-17, 2023 and celebrated the festival's tenth anniversary. Attractions were held at Contemporary Calgary, Shaw Millennium Park, and Telus Spark, and included the outdoor art installation "Body" by Walk the Plank.

The tenth edition took place from September 20-22, 2024.

=== 2025 (cancelled) ===
Beakerhead was not held in September 2025. The organisers said that the festival would be "taking a pause". It was suggested that a "pause" would enable them to consider how Beakerhead can potentially return in the future to a city that is growing and changing.

=== 2026: Petri Dish ===
In September 2026, Beakerhead was announced as "Petri Dish". It took place from November 6-8.
