= Peter von Tiesenhausen =

Canadian environmental artist

Peter von Tiesenhausen is a Canadian artist working near Demmitt in Peace River Country, Alberta. He is known for his environmental activism and art installations, particularly his work Lifeline.

== Early life ==
Von Tiesenhausen was born in New Westminster, British Columbia to Baltic German parents who moved to Canada after being stripped of their property in Estonia. His family moved to northern Alberta when he was three. When his father put the family farm up for sale, von Tiesenhausen bought a quarter of it, and continued acquiring more land in subsequent years. He worked in mining and construction for 14 years, including in Antarctica, before committing himself to art full-time at the age of 31.

== Lifeline ==
Von Tiesenhausen's most famous work, Lifeline, is a white picket fence on his land in Demmitt that has had eight feet added to it each year, beginning in 1990. The idea arose from a discussion at the Banff Centre about Douglas Cardinal's suit to block an addition to St. Mary's Church in Red Deer, which Cardinal had designed. Von Tiesenhausen's land sits close to a gas plant, and company representatives threatened expropriation for a pipeline right-of-way. In response, von Tiesenhausen declared that the land was actually an artwork subject to copyright, such that disturbing the surface would be a violation of his rights. He then built the first section of the fence, and adds a new section every May after his birthday. The company diverted the pipeline, and von Tiesenhausen has managed to settle all other matters with oil and gas companies out of court.

== Other works and accomplishments ==
Von Tiesenhausen has produced many other works of environmental art. In his work Vessel/Enclosure, he build a boat out of willow branches and left it to decay, photographing it repeatedly from the same position. He carved five enormous wooden figures called The Watchers and transported them more than 30,000 km across Canada, exposing them to the elements. Castings of the figures, showing the signs of weathering from exposure, were ultimately placed in Downtown Toronto.

In 2008, von Tiesenhausen protested against Prime Minister Stephen Harper's comments to the effect that arts are for the elite by burying an iron bust in Sarnia, Ontario, stating: "Harper wants us to bury culture, we'll bury culture." In 2017, a work by von Tiesenhausen called Drawn by Desire, made of nearly 500 stamped metal plates forming a human silhouette, was displayed in a Simons store in Londonderry Mall, Edmonton. In 2018, he had a solo exhibition at the Art Gallery of Alberta. In 2020, his work Things I Knew to Be True was unveiled at the Stanley A. Milner Library, consisting of rows of human-like figures in cut metal arranged in the form of paragraphs of text.

Together with his son Maggie Tiesenhausen and art collector Murray Quinn, von Tiesenhausen founded the secretive, experimental art gallery Doris, operated out of the Beaverlodge Art and Culture Centre in Beaverlodge, Alberta. Peter von Tiesenhausen and Maggie Tiesenhausen also operate the Common Opulence residency program in Demmitt.
