= Telus World of Science Edmonton =

Science centre in Alberta, Canada

Coordinates: 53.5611°N 113.5639°W

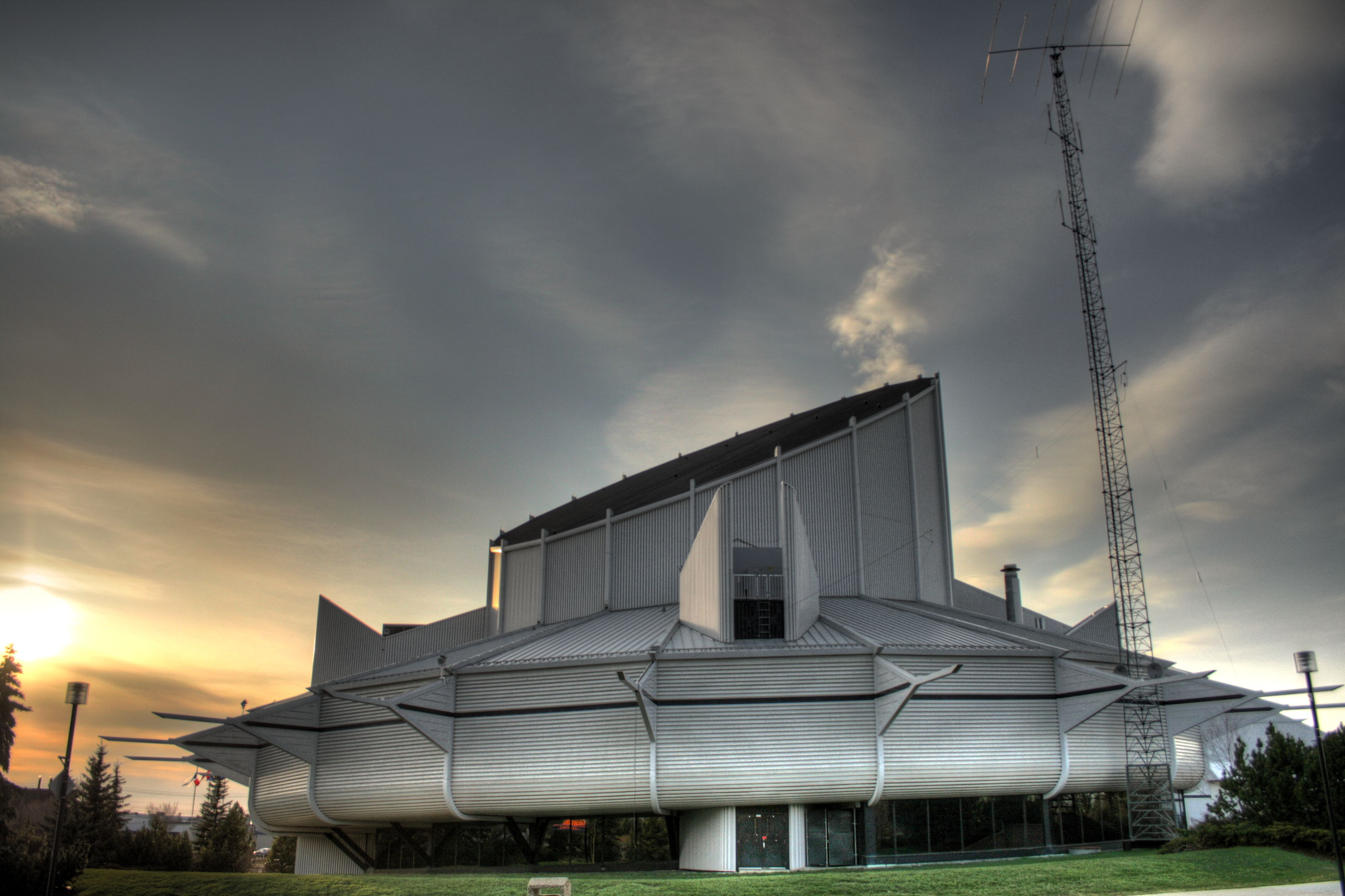

- Located in Edmonton
- Former name: Edmonton Space Sciences Centre (1984–1990); Edmonton Space and Science Centre (1990–2001); Odyssium (2001–2005)
- Established: July 1, 1984
- Location: 11211 142 Street NW; Edmonton, Alberta, Canada; T5M 4A1
- Type: Science centre
- Visitors: 580,000 (2023)
- CEO: Constance Scarlett
- Architect: Douglas Cardinal
- Public transit access: Westmount Transit Centre
- Website: telusworldofscienceedmonton.ca

Telus World of Science Edmonton (TWOSE) is a broad-based science centre in Edmonton, Alberta, Canada, operated by the (non-profit) Edmonton Space & Science Foundation. The centre is located on the southwest corner of Coronation Park in the neighborhood of Woodcroft. The science centre houses 144,430 sq. ft. of public space and is the largest science centre in Western Canada (by largest total public space). It is currently a member of both the Association of Science-Technology Centers (ASTC) and the Canadian Association of Science Centres (CASC).

== History ==
The centre's predecessor, Queen Elizabeth Planetarium, operated as Edmonton's planetarium and was located to the east of the centre. The Queen Elizabeth Planetarium opened its doors to the public in 1960 and was named in honour of Queen Elizabeth II. It was equipped with a star projector, which allowed it to simulate the night sky and provide educational programs about stars, planets, and celestial events. The planetarium was originally built with a seating capacity of 65.

In 1978, the Space Sciences Foundation was founded to promote the construction of a new planetarium and science centre in Edmonton. The following year, Douglas Cardinal was selected as the project's architect. In mid-1980, the project was approved in principle by the City of Edmonton after the foundation won a $6.5 million commitment from the Alberta 75th anniversary committee. On August 18, 1980, the city's economic affairs committee recommended Government House Park, next to the Provincial Museum of Alberta, as the site of the new science centre. On August 30, 1980, the city selected the Edmonton Space Sciences Centre as the city's commemorate project for Alberta's 75th anniversary. However, following the dedication, the project faced uncertainly due to delays in the site selection as well as rising costs as city administration wanted to build the centre in Rossdale despite local residents opposing the site. By December 1980, the province stepped in and ordered the city to conduct a historical impact study before proceeding with the Rossdale site. On December 8, 1981, the Government House Park site and budget was approved. However, on December 17, the site was changed to Coronation Park after city council voted to rescind its earlier decision. Groundbreaking of the science centre took place in March 1982 and was expected to be completed in 1984.

On July 1, 1984, the Edmonton Space Sciences Centre officially opened to the general public. By 1988, the centre faced financial problems and was seen a 'black hole' for the city due to the centre facing $1.6 million in capital debt, accumulating an operating deficit of $600,000 over five years, and declining revenues from its IMAX theatre. In late June 1988, the centre was granted $250,000 in emergency funds by the city to keep its operation afloat. A $1.6 million loan was also given by the province to cover the capital debts. In December 1988, city council voted to take control over the centre from the foundation. In August 1989, the city reached an agreement that would see the foundation remain as a non-profit and to run the centre and its programming while also working with civic groups in promoting the city's science and technology initiatives.

On May 14, 1990, the centre officially changes its name to Edmonton Space and Science Centre. From 1989 to 1993, the centre underwent a $3.8 million renovation which added 1,530 square metres (16,500 ft^{2}) of new exhibit space, a revamped cafeteria and gift shop, expanded parking, and making the centre handicap-accessible. In 1997, the centre's original debt was paid off.

In 1998, the science centre proposed a $10 million expansion to the facility that would see four galleries with 40,000 square feet of space for permanent, temporary, and travelling exhibits. The following year, Edmonton Space and Science Centre revealed the design of the project which included renovations to the existing space exhibits, labs, and theatre, and a 2,970 square metres (32,000 ft^{2}) expansion for three new galleries. Groundbreaking on the project, now at a cost of $14 million, began in May 2000. The facility re-opened to the public on July 1, 2001 under its new name, Odyssium.

In 2005, the Odyssium was renamed the Telus World of Science Edmonton under a 20-year naming rights deal with Telus Communications worth $8.2 million.

The centre's IMAX theatre underwent a $4 million renovation in 2013 which included increasing the screen size, making it the largest IMAX screen in Alberta, upgraded seats, and two digital 3D IMAX projectors to replace the older IMAX film projector. In 2015, the IMAX theatre upgraded to a 4K laser projector system. Beginning in 2016, the science centre underwent a $41.5 million expansion and renovation called Aurora Project. Phase one and two of the project, which saw the refurbishment of the Purple Pear restaurant and renovation of the Zeidler Dome and S.P.A.C.E. (Stars, Planets, Astronauts, Comets, etc.) Gallery, were completed in September 2016 and August 2018, respectively. Phase three was completed between 2018 and 2022 with the addition of new galleries: Nature Exchange, Curious City, and Health Zone, the expansion of the Science Garage, a new front entrance, and new gift shop. Phase 4, which saw the addition of Arctic Journey Expedition Gallery, was completed in September 2022.

== Facilities ==
The Telus World of Science Edmonton features a 190-seat theatre that shows educational movies, shot in high resolution IMAX film reel. Images are enhanced by a custom designed six-channel, multi-speaker sound system are projected onto a 13m x 19m (4 storey x 6 storey) screen. When the science centre opened in 1984, it was the first IMAX theatre in Western Canada.

The 200-seat Zeidler Dome (formerly known as Margaret Zeidler Star Theatre) is used for laser shows and presentations. It was the largest such theatre in Canada when the centre opened in 1984. In 2008, the theatre's projection system was converted to digital with the use of Sky-Skan's Digital Sky II system, making it first planetarium and science centre in Canada to showcase the digital technology for domed theatres. The dome is additionally equipped with a digital laser system for its musical laser light shows.

The science centre has a restaurant called Purple Pear for visitors and for special events such as fundraisers. The restaurant is also responsible for providing the concession, which is currently hosted in the main lobby, next to the box office. and a new focus on fresher, and local ingredients. They were also the first location in Western Canada to use tagged Coca-Cola Freestyle machines.

There is also a gift shop in the lobby, featuring a range of educational products, books, and gift items.

Due to historic rain levels in the summer of 2026, the facility was forced to close for a few months due to flooding which caused significant damage to the first floor.

== Coronation Park facilities ==
=== Queen Elizabeth II Planetarium (QEP) ===
Built in 1959, the Queen Elizabeth Planetarium was the original home of the science centre. The RASC previously ran the QEP from 1960-1983 until the Edmonton Space Science foundation took over soon afterward. In 2016 the City of Edmonton announced plans to restore the planetarium and grant it full heritage status. On July 1, 2023, the QEP was opened to the public and is now operational.

=== Observatory ===
Built the same time as the original Edmonton Science Centre, the Observatory opened its doors in 1984. This outdoor structure is located in Coronation Park and It is free of charge, but it opens only when the weather permits, and it closes if the temperature is below −10 °C (14 °F). It is equipped with seven telescopes, including a Meade 16" LX200, a 180 mm (7 in) Starfire refractor, and three solar telescopes all provided by the Royal Astronomical Society of Canada (Edmonton Centre).

== Building design ==
The building was designed by architect Douglas Cardinal.

== Moon rock ==
The science centre houses a moon rock collected during the Apollo 11 mission in 1969. Lunar Sample Number 15555,791 is a basaltic fragment from the lunar surface. The moon rock at TWOSE is part of NASA's outreach program.

== Arctic research ==
TWOSE is an active member of the University of the Arctic. UArctic is an international cooperative network based in the Circumpolar Arctic region, consisting of more than 200 universities, colleges, and other organizations with an interest in promoting education and research in the Arctic region.

== See also ==
- Telus World of Science (disambiguation)
- TELUS Spark Science Centre, Calgary
- List of astronomical observatories in Canada
