= Downtown West End, Calgary =

Downtown West End Downtown west end area
- Neighbourhood
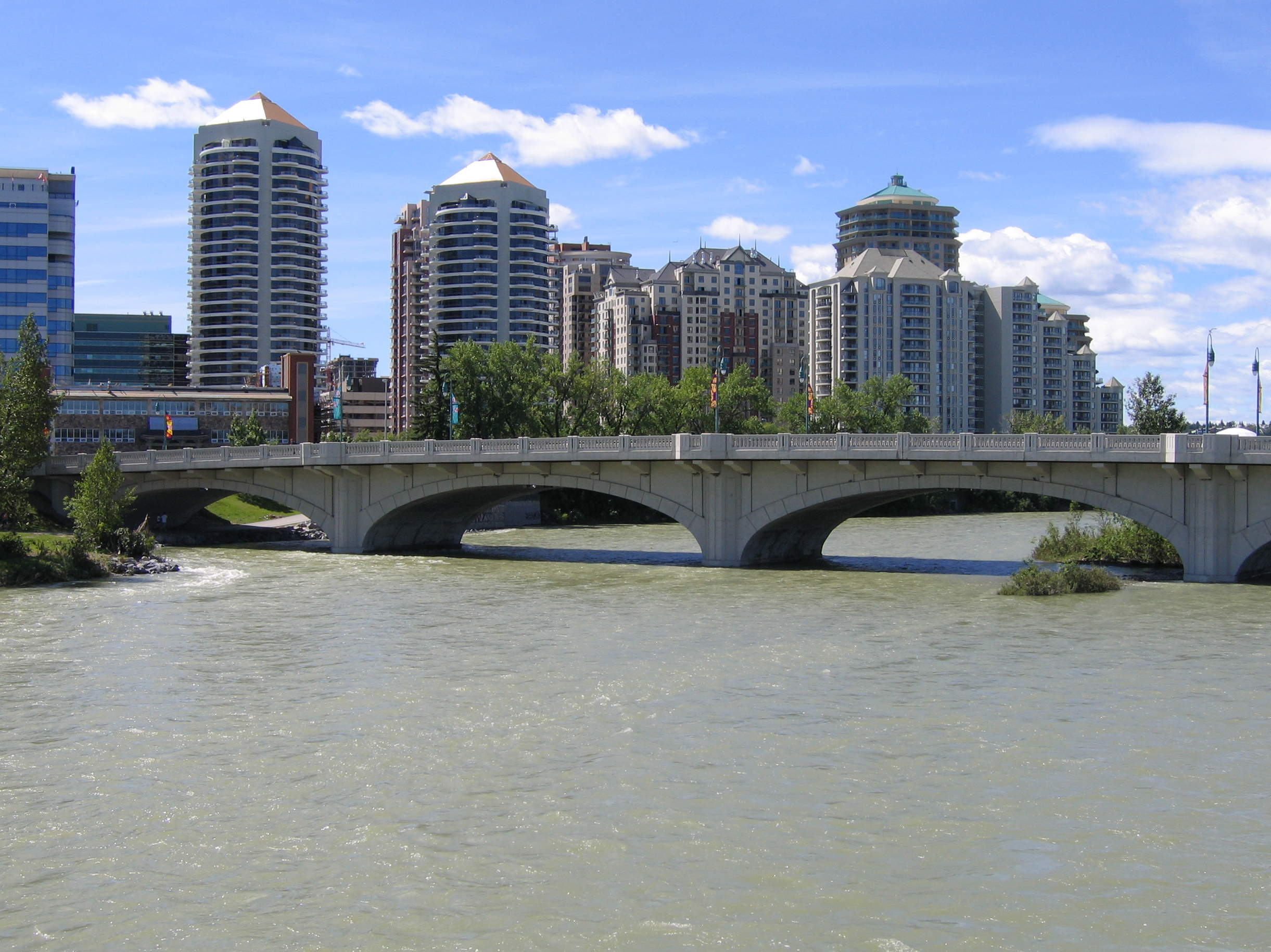
- Condominiums in the Downtown West End

- Location of Downtown West End in Calgary
- Coordinates: 51°02′50″N 114°05′10″W
- Country: Canada
- Province: Alberta
- City: Calgary
- Quadrant: SW
- Ward: 7
- Established: 1884

Government
  - Mayor: Jeromy Farkas
  - Administrative body: Calgary City Council
  - Councillor: Myke Atkinson (Independent)

Area
  - Total: 0.338 km^{2} (0.131 sq mi)
- Elevation: 1,050 m (3,440 ft)

Population (2021)
  - Total: 2,825
  - Average Income: $47,964
- Website: dwca.ca

The Downtown West End is a neighbourhood within the western portions of downtown Calgary, Alberta, Canada. It is bounded to the north by the Bow River, to the east by 9th Street W, to the south by the CPR Tracks and to the west by 14th Street W.

West End is a high density residential community, largely made up of condominiums and apartment buildings, with only 25 single-family detached homes remaining in the neighbourhood.

Downtown Calgary was established as a neighbourhood in 1884, after the arrival of the Canadian Pacific Railway in 1883. It is represented in the Calgary City Council by the Ward 7 councillor and represented at the provincial and federal levels by the MLA for Calgary-Buffalo and the MP for Calgary Centre respectively.

== Attractions ==
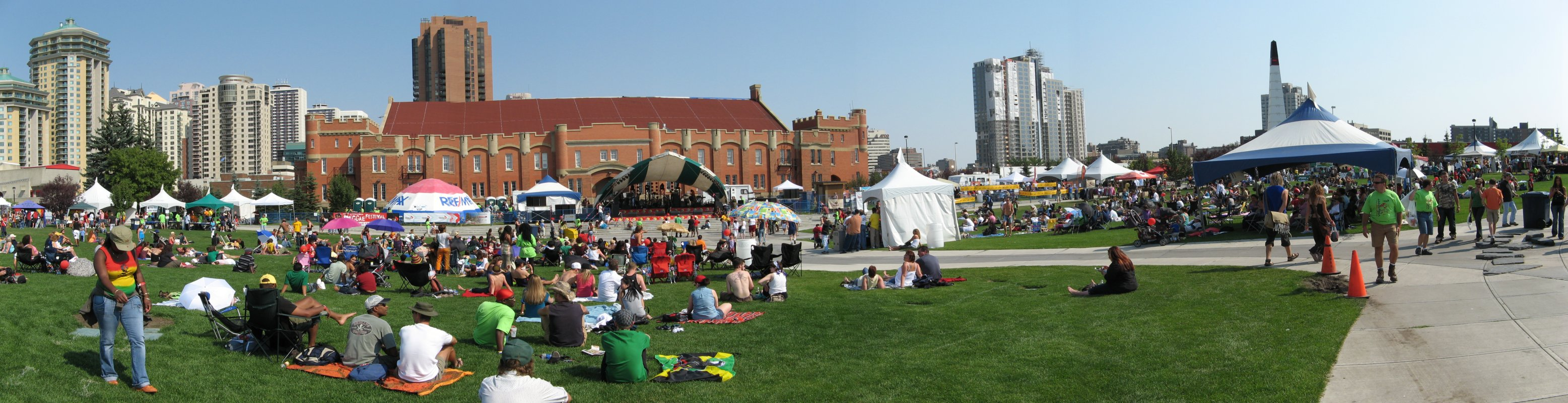
Calgary International Reggae Festival in Cowboys Park, Mewata Armouries in background

Cowboys Park and Mewata Armouries are located in the western area of the neighbourhood, while paved multi-use (bicycle, walking, rollerblading, etc.) paths line the northern rim along the Bow River.

Contemporary Calgary, a public art gallery, is located in the building that previously housed the Centennial Planetarium and the Calgary Science Centre.

The Downtown West - Kerby C-Train station serves the community. Downtown West End is also well connected into the Plus 15 skywalk system.

== Demographics ==
In the City of Calgary's 2019 civic census, Downtown West End had a population of 2,785 living in 2,061 dwellings, increasing from its 2018 population of 2,757 and decreasing 1 dwelling. There is an average 1.73 residents per dwelling.

Residents in this community had a median household income of $81,000 in 2021. As of 2021, 46% of the residents were immigrants.

== Crime ==
Crime Data
Year	Crime Rate (/100 pop.)
2018	3.5
2019	3.7
2020	3.5
2021	4.0
2022	3.8
2023	2.9

== See also ==
- List of neighbourhoods in Calgary
