= BNet =

BNet may refer to:

- Bungie.net, homepage of news and updates for Bungie and Destiny.
- Battle.net, an online gaming service provided by Blizzard Entertainment
- Student Radio Network, a group of radio stations in New Zealand previously branded as bNet
- beibl.net (BNET), a Welsh Bible translation.
- BNET, a defunct online magazine about business management owned by CBS Interactive
