= John Rennie (editor) =

American science writer (born 1959)

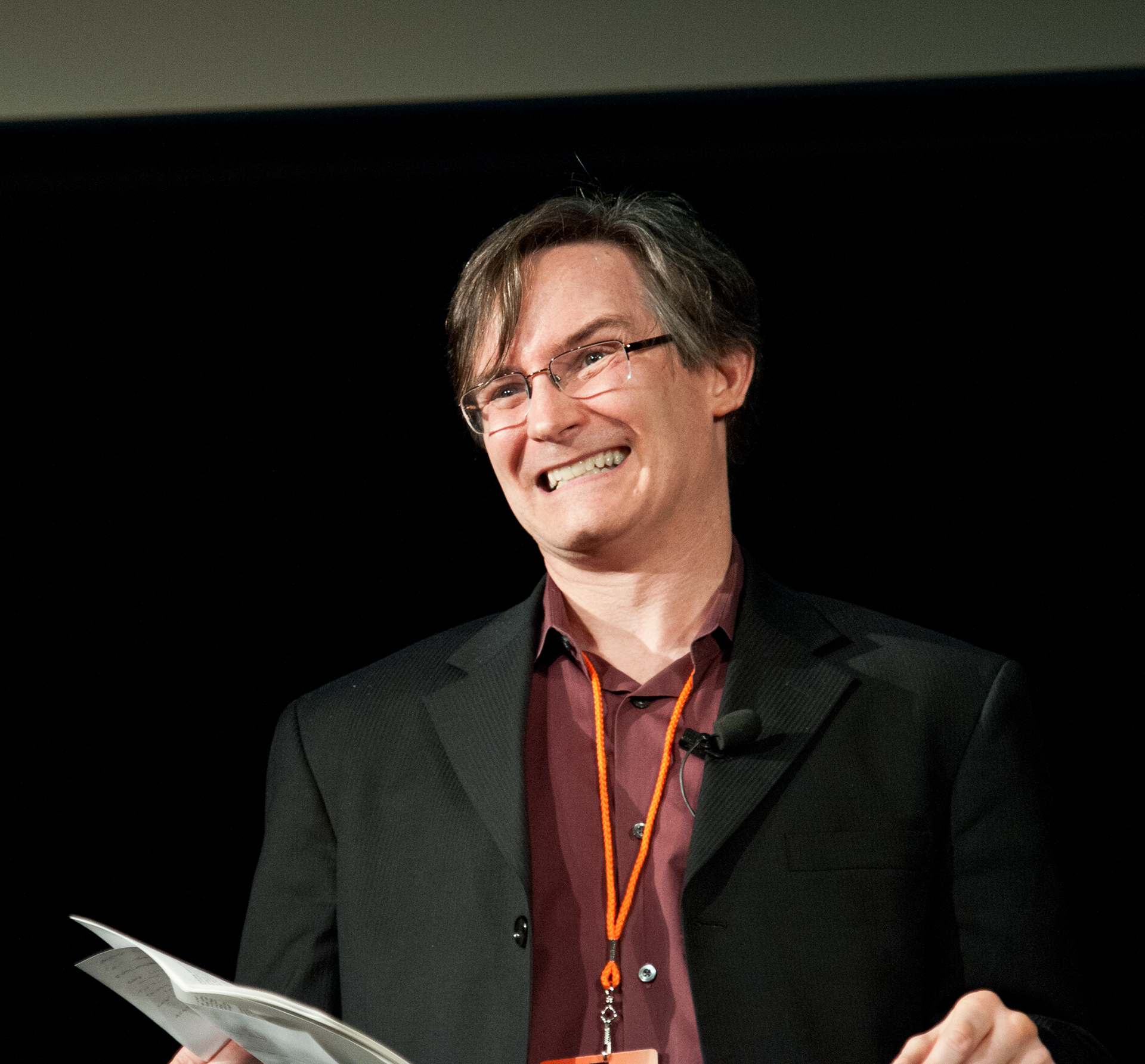
- Rennie speaking at NECSS 2011 conference in New York City
- Born: 1959 (age 66–67); Massachusetts, U.S.
- Education: Yale University (BS)
- Occupations: Biologist; journalist; writer; editor
- Awards: Carl Sagan Award for Public Understanding of Science (2000), Navigator Award from the Potomac Institute for Policy Studies (2003)
- Website: http://johnrennie.net

John Rennie (born 1959) is an American science writer who was the seventh editor in chief of Scientific American magazine. After leaving Scientific American in 2009, he began writing for Public Library of Science (PLoS) Blogs. Rennie has also been involved with several television programs and podcasts as well as multiple writing projects, including his latest position as a deputy editor on the staff of Quanta Magazine.

== Biography ==
John Rennie was born in 1959, near Boston, MA. In 1981, he completed a Bachelor of Science in Biology at Yale University. Rennie then worked for the better part of a decade in a laboratory at Harvard Medical School before commencing his career as a science writer and editor. He began his editorial career with Scientific American in 1989 when he joined its editorial board, becoming editor-in-chief in 1994. Rennie has several published articles in Scientific American, starting with the September 1989 issue and as recently as the December 2013 issue. Rennie has had a varied career in addition to his time as an editor at Scientific American, including positions in higher education, as an author, and as a television host.

== Career ==
=== Scientific American ===
Rennie joined the Board of Editors at Scientific American in 1989. In 1994 he was installed as the 7th editor-in-chief for Scientific American, serving in that role until 2009. While editor-in-chief, Rennie was involved in several projects including the launch of its website, authoring articles, and contributing to Scientific American's podcasts, Science Talk and 60-Second Science.

=== Television ===
Rennie has appeared in, or contributed in some other way to, several television programs since the mid-1990s:

- A&E Networks' Scams, Schemes, and Scoundrels
- CNN's Anderson Cooper 360°
- History's Weird U.S. and MysteryQuest
- National Geographic's Naked Science
- The Weather Channel's Hacking the Planet and The Truth About Twisters
- Travel Channel's Mysteries at the Museum
- Science's Space's Deepest Secrets

=== Other writing ===
The blog that Rennie authored for PLoS, The Gleaming Retort, primarily focuses on science writing, climate, technology, and health. It was active from September 2010 through December 2014.

Rennie wrote the blog The Savvy Scientist for SmartPlanet between November 2011 and September 2012 and penned a handful of articles for the General Electric sponsored online magazine, Txchnologist, in 2011 and 2012.

In 2017, Rennie joined the staff of Quanta Magazine as a deputy editor.

=== Higher education ===
Rennie is listed as adjunct faculty for the graduate Science, Health and Environmental Reporting Program at New York University's Arthur L. Carter Journalism Institute. Rennie also appears as core faculty for Beakerhead's SciComm Lab.

== Awards ==
In 2000, Rennie was awarded the Carl Sagan Award for Public Understanding of Science by the Council of Scientific Society Presidents. In September 2003, he was awarded the Navigator Award from Potomac Institute for Policy Studies.

== Selected articles ==
- Rennie, John (November 1993). "Insects are Forever". Scientific American. 269 (5): 9–10.
- Rennie, John (February 1994). "Too Little, Too Late?". Scientific American. 270 (2): 11–12.
- Rennie, John (July 2002). "15 Answers to Creationist Nonsense". Scientific American. 287 (1).
- Rennie, John; Mirsky, Steve (April 16, 2008). "Six Things in Expelled That Ben Stein Doesn't Want You to Know..." Scientific American.
- Rennie, John (November 30, 2009). "Seven Answers to Climate Contrarian Nonsense". Scientific American.
- Rennie, John (September 14, 2010). "Creationist Blarney". The Gleaming Retort.
- Rennie, John (May 28, 2011). "The Ice That Burns: Are Methane Hydrates the Next Big Resource?". Txchnologist.
- Rennie, John (June 30, 2011). "Lead Zeppelin: Can Airships Overcome Past Disasters and Rise Again?". Txchnologist.
- Rennie, John (April 25, 2012). "Recap of "Science Writing in the Age of Denial" (part 1)". The Gleaming Retort.
- Rennie, John (April 28, 2012). "Recap of "Science Writing in the Age of Denial" (part 2)". The Gleaming Retort.
- Rennie, John (February 26, 2013). "Evolved Fists or the Best Weapons at Hand?". The Gleaming Retort.
- Rennie, John (September 2, 2013). "Sequencing the Snipe's Genome, and Other Lab Hazing Rituals". The Gleaming Retort.
- Rennie, John (July 17, 2014). "Passion and 3D printers reinvent STEM learning". The Gleaming Retort.
