= Centennial Planetarium =

Former planetarium in Calgary, Canada

Coordinates: 51.04744°N 114.08947°W

The Centennial Planetarium, located at 701 11 Street SW in Calgary, Alberta, was designed by Calgary architectural firm McMillan Long and Associates and opened in 1967 for the Canadian Centennial, it is one of Calgary's best examples of Brutalist architecture, winning several awards open its opening. As of 2019, the building houses Contemporary Calgary, a public art gallery.

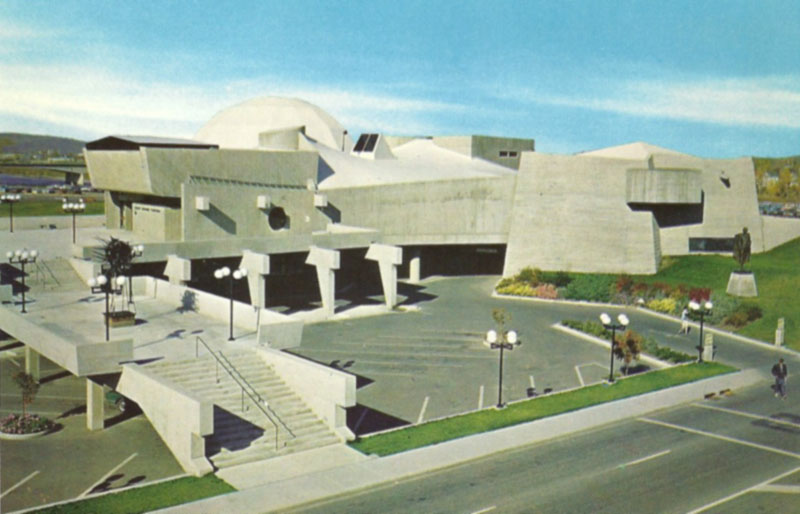
Centennial Planetarium 1970 R. Hopf

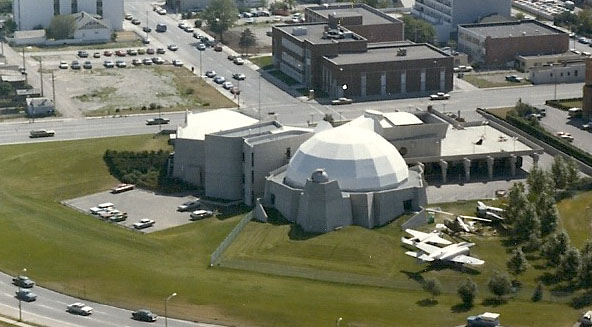
Calgary Centennial Planetarium Aerial Photo early 70s

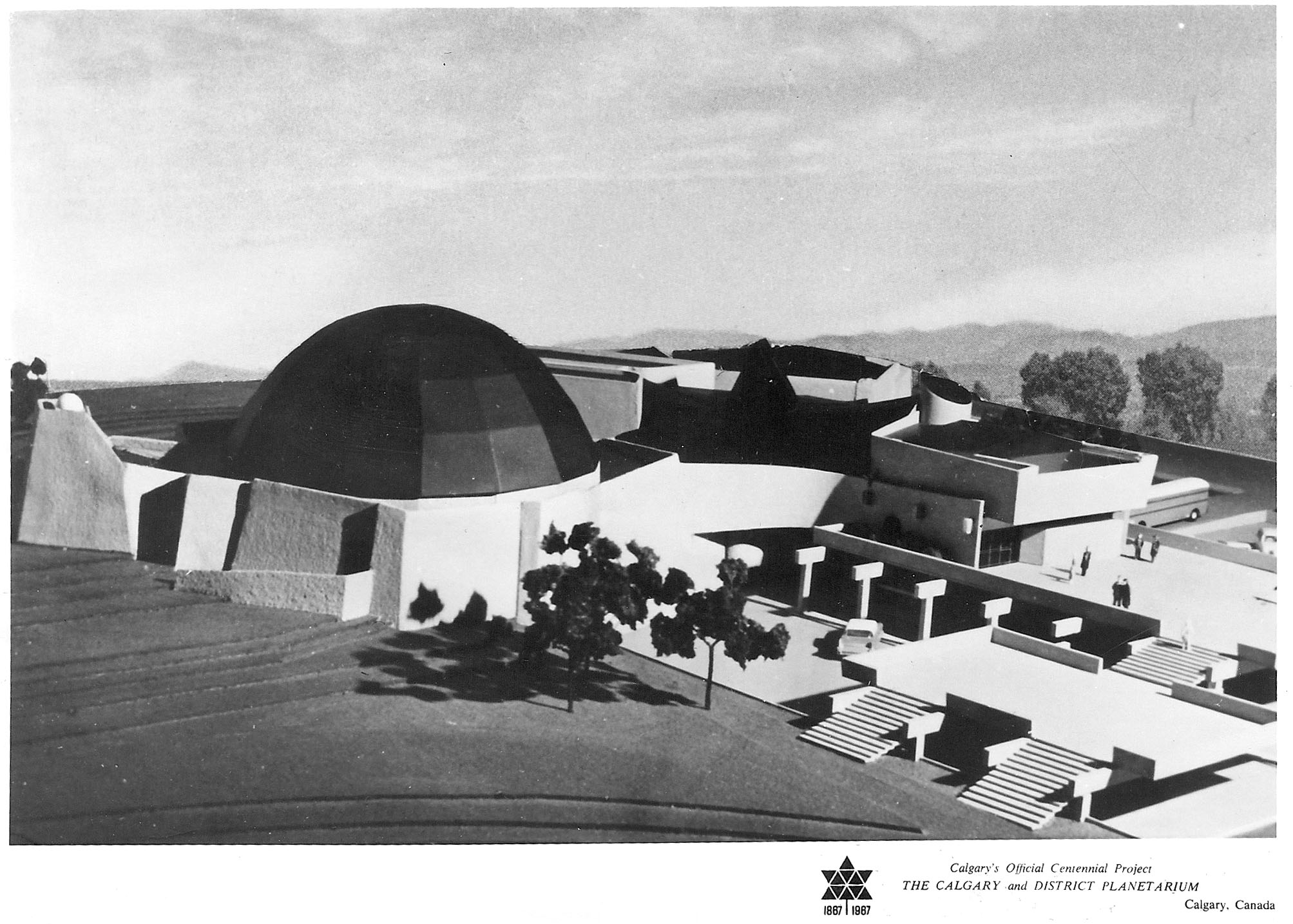
Calgary Centennial Planetarium Concept Model

== History and design ==
For the Canadian Centennial in 1967, the City of Calgary elected to undertake, as a civic project, the construction of a new planetarium. This choice was reflective of the interest in space exploration that was prominent in the 1960s. A design competition was held in 1964 for the new building. Advised by the director of the architecture department at the University of British Columbia, Henry Elder, the three finalists were McMillan Long, Gordon Atkins, and Bill Boucock. The design by the firm of McMillan Long and Associates was eventually selected as the winner. This firm had been established in 1964 between Hugh McMillan and Jack Long, and lasted until 1969, at which time McMillan retired. The Centennial Planetarium was built between 1966 and 1967 by Sam Hashman.

Built on a site north of Mewata Armouries overlooking the Bow River, the Planetarium is constructed of raw concrete and features non-orthogonal design. Designed around a central bay, the building has two main wings. The west wing holds the "celestial theatre," a 255-seat theatre with a 65-foot domed screen. The east wing holds a 250-seat lecture hall. The Planetarium also contained a library, observation deck, and telescopes.

In 1967 the Planetarium won the Nation Design Council Concrete Award, and in 1970 the Massey Medal in Architecture.

From 1971 to 1985, the Planetarium also housed the collection of aircraft, aero engines, and associated reference library that became the basis of the Hangar Flight Museum.

In 1984 the Calgary Science Centre moved into the Centennial Planetarium. It would occupy the space for the next 27 years, vacating the building in 2011. On 27 June 2011, the Calgary Science Centre ceased operations at the planetarium before moving to their new location in the Nose Creek valley, which opened in October of that same year.

Although there have been several additions, the building is in mostly-original form. In 2010, a significant portion of the parking structure on the south side was removed to make way for the west line of the CTrain.

In June 2018, Contemporary Calgary, a new public art gallery, reached an agreement with the City of Calgary to lease the property for 25 years. It was then renovated by the City of Calgary and the architecture firm Lemay, then known as Lemay + Toker. The renovations included a 10,000 sq ft (930 m^{2}) gallery and a second 3,000 sq ft (280 m^{2}) gallery, a rooftop sculpture garden and event space, entrance pavilion, restaurant and public space.

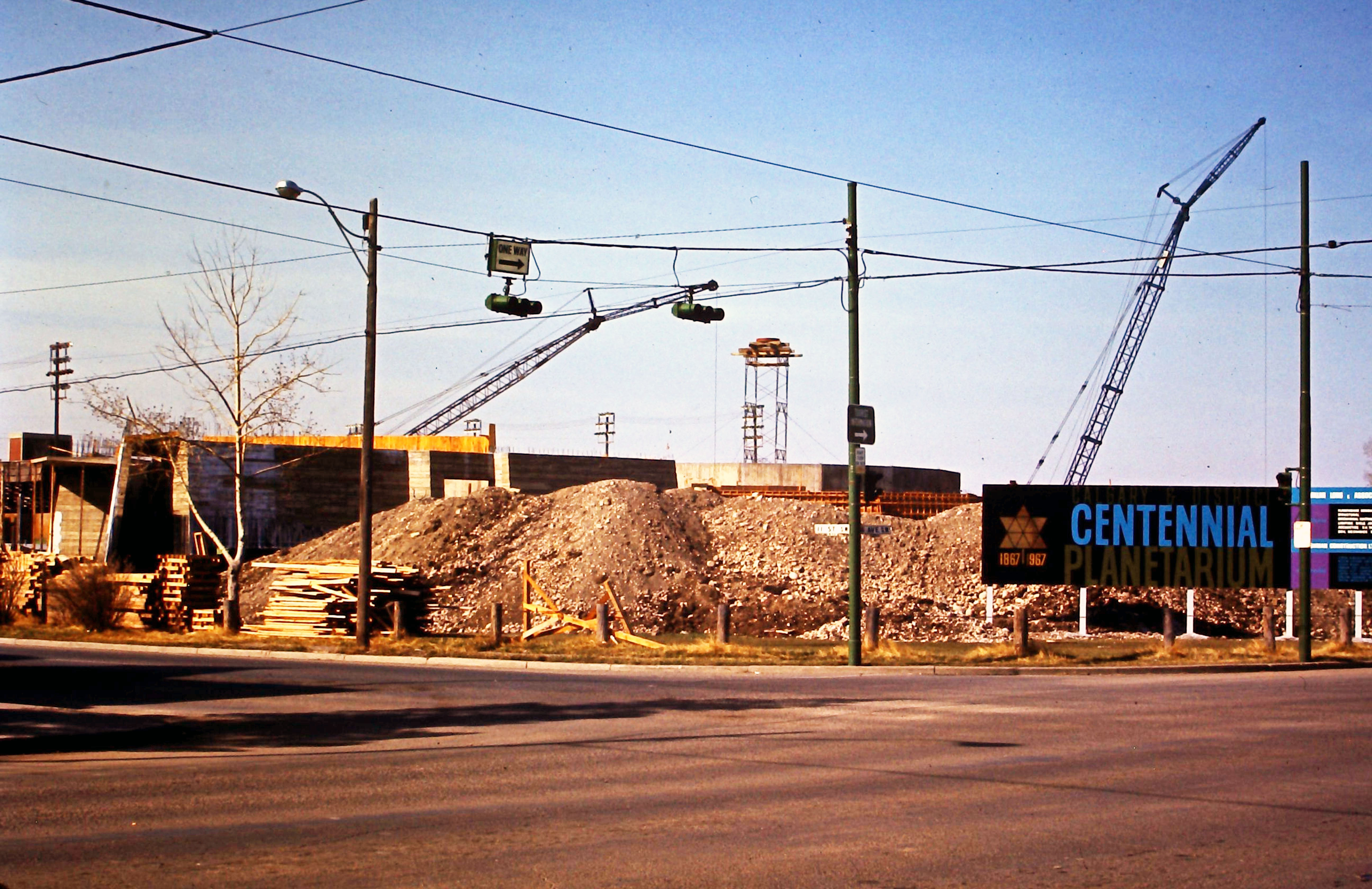
Calgary Centennial Planetarium 1966

== Current status ==
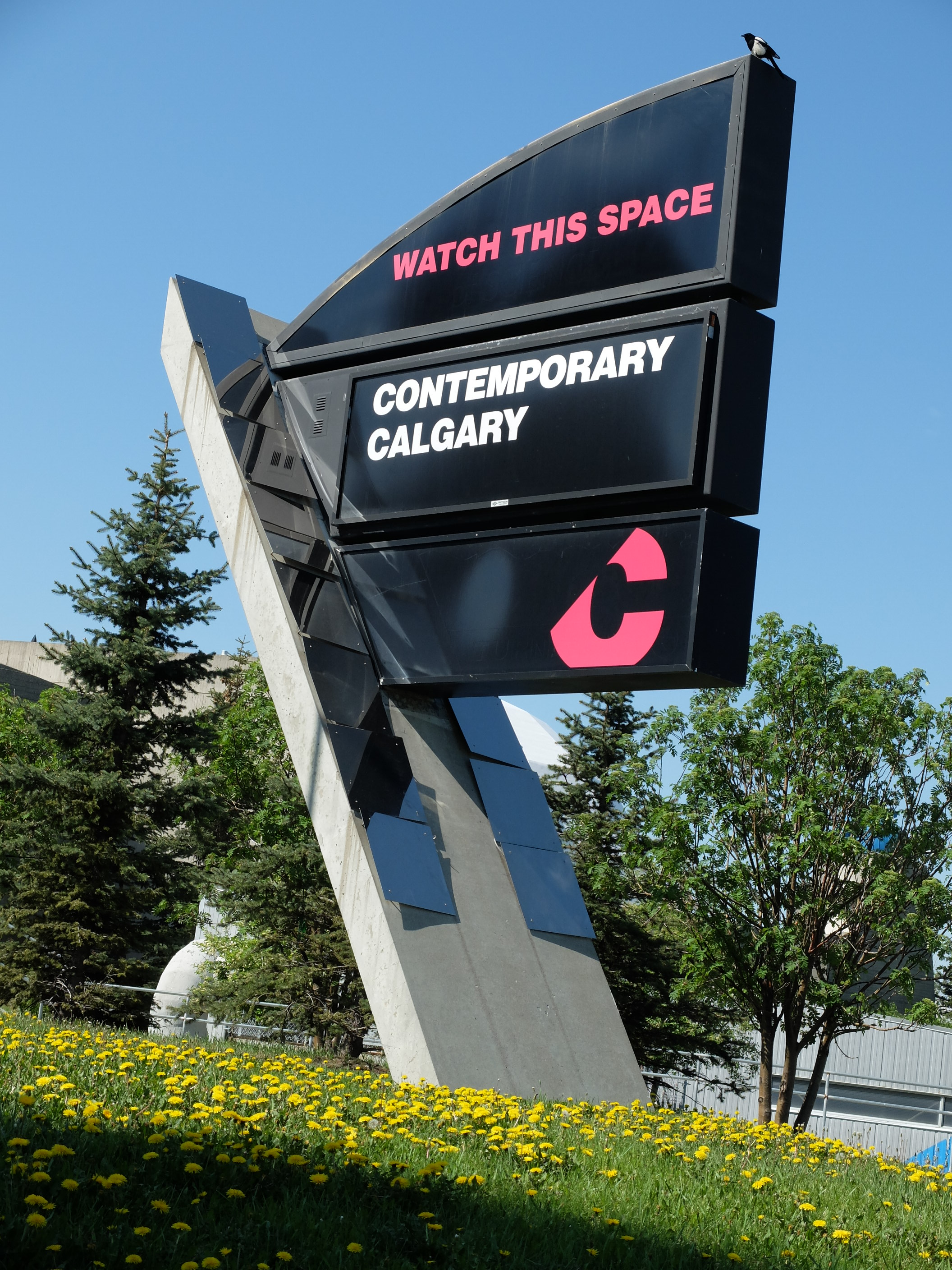
Sign advertising new residency of Contemporary Calgary, May 2017

In March 2014, the City of Calgary agreed to work with the newly formed Contemporary Calgary - an amalgamation of the Art Gallery of Calgary, the Institute for Modern and Contemporary Art and the Museum of Contemporary Art Calgary - to turn the planetarium into an art gallery. The City of Calgary began renovating and upgrading the building and its facilities in 2017. Major new federal funding was announced in August 2019, and the new location was open to the public two days a week while work continued.

Today the gallery hosts several exhibition spaces, a cinema/performing art space and educational spaces for outreach. It showcases a revolving schedule of exhibitions and events year round, including major commissions that engage the history of its Brutalist architecture and scientific past, such as Charles Stankievech's exhibition The Desert Turned to Glass.

== See also ==
- List of Brutalist structures
