= Gordon Atkins =

Canadian retired architect

Gordon Lee Atkins (born 5 March 1937) is a Canadian retired architect. During a career lasting from 1960 to 1999, he practiced primarily in Calgary, although he designed several projects elsewhere in western Canada. Along with contemporaries including Peter Hemingway, Jack Long, and Douglas Cardinal, Atkins is credited with developing a distinct Canadian prairie style of architecture. In 1967 Atkins became the first Albertan to receive the Massey Medal for Architecture.

== Biography ==
Atkins was born Gordon Lee Kearl on 5 March 1937 in Calgary, Alberta. Shortly after his birth his parents divorced and he moved to Cardston with his mother, living with her and his grandparents. Later he changed his last name to his mother's.

After a suggestion by his high school principal, Atkins decided to study architecture in university. Choosing to attend the University of Washington, he studied there from 1955 to 1960. Upon graduation Atkins took a job in Winnipeg with the firm Green Blankstein and Russell. After working a year in Winnipeg, in 1961 Atkins moved to Calgary where he joined the partnership Alton McCaul Bowers. In 1963 he opened his own practice under his own name. For his Melchin Summer Homes, in 1967 he became the first Albertan architect to win the Massey Medal for Architecture. In 1977 he formed a partnership with Robert E. Weston called Gordon Atkins and Associates Architects.

Atkins lived in a home at 1008 Durham Avenue South West in the Mount Royal neighbourhood in Calgary. He used the house to experiment ideas on, significantly modifying it during his residence. The house was demolished circa 2011. A Mormon, he has twice served as a bishop in the Church of Jesus Christ of Latter-day Saints.

Atkins's records are held at the Canadian Architectural Archives in Calgary as the Gordon Atkins fonds.

== Works ==
Name	City	Address	Year
Merle Derochie House	Calgary	6725 Laird Crescent South West	1964
Bloch House	Seattle		1964
Melchin Summer Homes	Windermere		1966
Eugene Coste Elementary School (addition)	Calgary	10 Hillgrove Crescent South West	1966
Alberta Government Telephones Building	Calgary	800 34th Avenue South West	1966
Drahanchuk Studio	Bragg Creek		1967
Mayland Heights Elementary School	Calgary	2324 Maunsell Drive North East	1967
Leavitt House	Calgary	920 Prospect Avenue South West	1969
Pinebrook Golf and Country Club	Calgary	166 Pinebrook Way South West	1971
Stoney Tribal Administration Building	Morley		1976
Falconridge Condominiums	Calgary	2200 Varsity Estates Drive North West	1977
Indian Friendship Centre	Calgary	140 2nd Avenue South West	1978
Shouldice Athletic Change Pavilion	Calgary	Shouldice Athletic Park	1979
Grande Prairie Regional College Electrical Training Facility	Grande Prairie	10609 104th Avenue	1980
Southern Alberta Youth Development Centre	Strathmore	630 Westchester Road	1980
Medicine Hat Provincial Building	Medicine Hat	346 3rd Street South East	1981
