= Telus World of Science =

Telus World of Science may refer to:

- Telus World of Science Edmonton
- Calgary Science Centre, known as Telus World of Science 2005–2011
- Science World (Vancouver), known as Science World at the Telus World of Science 2005–2020
