= Contemporary Calgary =

Contemporary art gallery, located in Calgary, Alberta, Canada

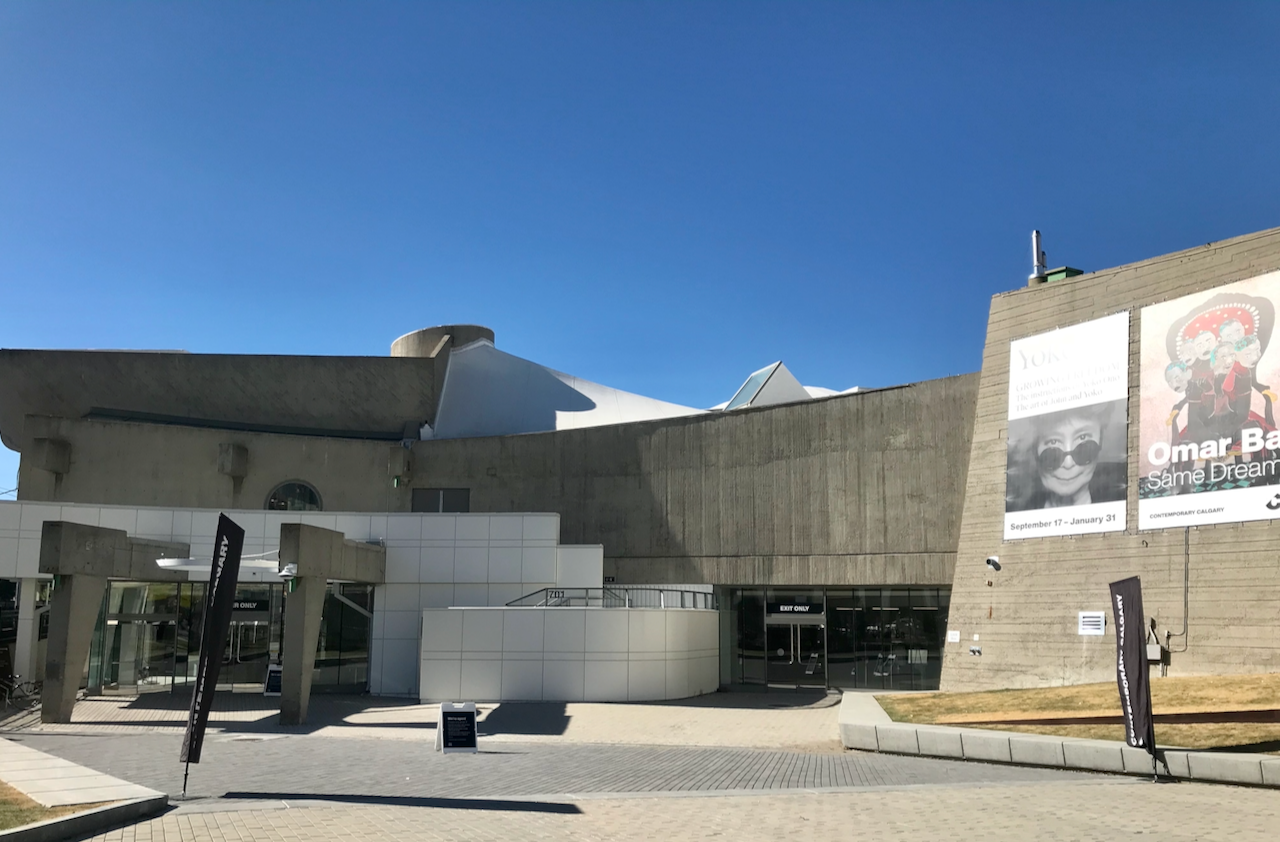
- Established: 2019
- Location: Calgary, Alberta, Canada
- Coordinates: 51°2′50.964″N 114°5′22.47″W
- Type: Art museum
- Website: https://www.contemporarycalgary.com

Contemporary Calgary is a public contemporary art gallery located in Calgary, Alberta, Canada. Located in the former Centennial Planetarium/TELUS World of Science building in the city's downtown core, the gallery offers contemporary art programming by local, national, and international artists. It launched its inaugural season in 2020.

== History ==
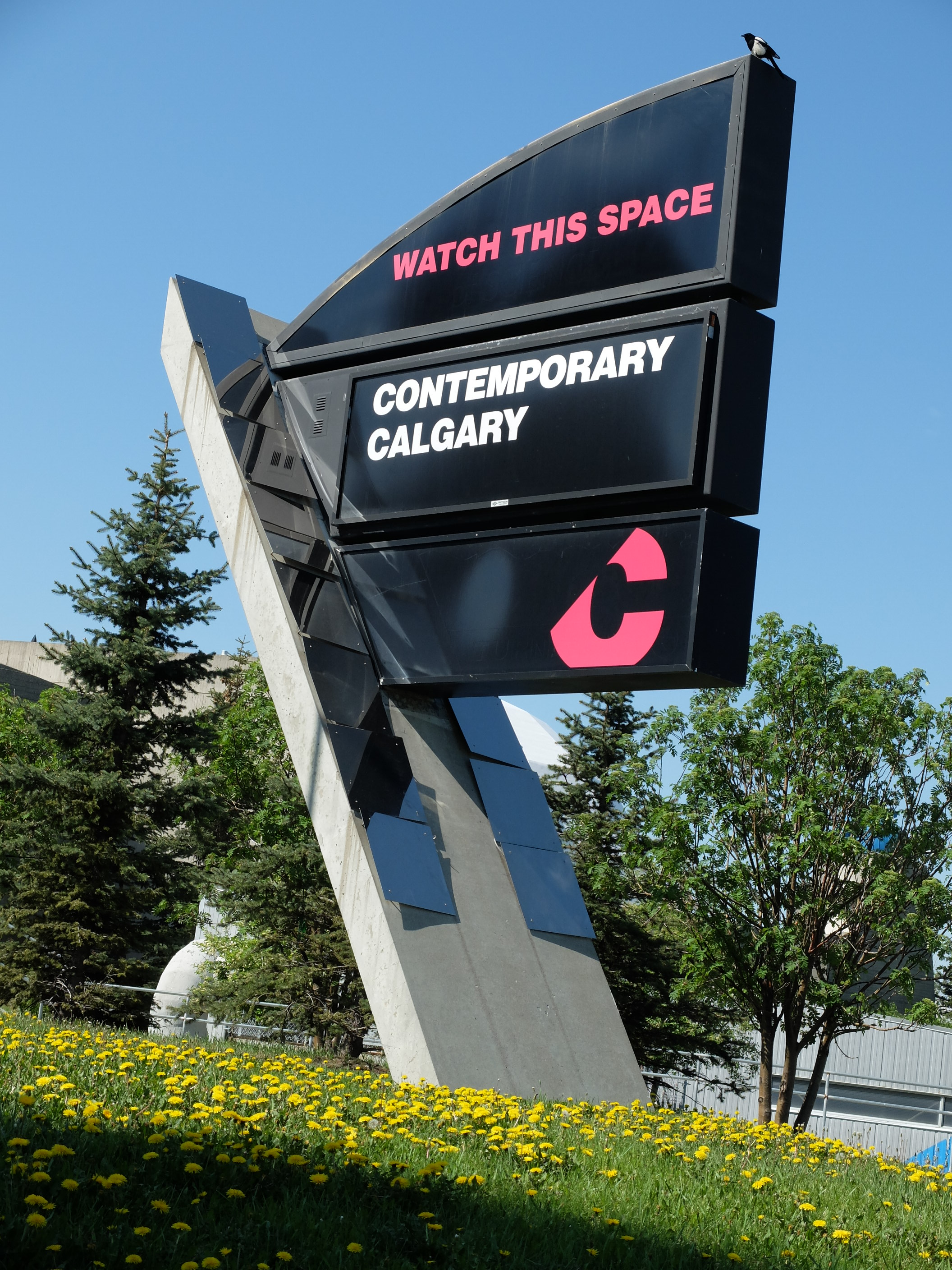
Sign advertising the forthcoming gallery in 2017.

In 2013, three arts groups in Calgary – the Institute of Modern and Contemporary Art, the Museum of Contemporary Art, and the Art Gallery of Calgary – joined to form Contemporary Calgary, a non-profit organization dedicated to creating a permanent public contemporary art gallery in the city. The group put forward a proposal to the City of Calgary to repurpose the vacant Centennial Planetarium for this goal.

In June 2018, Contemporary Calgary reached an agreement with the city to lease the property for 25 years. The City of Calgary contributed $25 million to upgrade the building; the Canadian government committed $30 million, contingent on matching funds from the provincial government. The rest of the project was funded by private donations.

In June 2019, Contemporary Calgary opened to the public for two days per week while renovations continued. In December 2019, it announced that this stage of renovations had been completed and that it would launch its first exhibitions in 2020, with opening hours expanded to six days per week.

On January 23, 2020, the organization held its official opening, with two exhibitions nodding to the building's history as a planetarium: Planetary, a group exhibition created by 35 local artists during workshops and residencies held on site, and British artist Luke Jerram's large-scale Museum of the Moon installation. More than 1,200 people attended on opening night. In March 2020, the organization temporarily closed its physical location due to the COVID-19 pandemic and began offering programming online. It reopened its doors in September 2020, with new exhibitions of works by Yoko Ono and Omar Ba.

== Architecture ==
The Centennial Planetarium was built in 1967, to mark the Canadian Centennial. It was built in the Brutalist style and a section includes a geodesic dome roof. The building housed a science centre (now Telus Spark) from the 1980s until 2011, at which time it became vacant. The building is located in the west end of Calgary's downtown core.

In January 2019, Contemporary Calgary announced that it had selected Bruce Kuwabara of KPMB Architects (Toronto) to lead the renovation of the building, along with Gibbs Gage Architects (Calgary). The first phase of the project, including the renovation of a 7,000-square foot gallery, opened to the public in January 2020. The second phase of the project includes the construction of a 10,000-square foot gallery, a 3,000-square foot gallery, a rooftop sculpture garden, and an event space. The project also includes plans for a new entrance pavilion and a restaurant.
