= SmartPlanet =

Online magazine

- "Insight and ideas that impact the world around you."
- Editor: Larry Dignan
- Categories: Business, technology, science, energy, healthcare, design, thought leadership
- Circulation: 250,000 readers
- Publisher: CBS Interactive
- First issue: November 2, 1999
- Final issue: June 30, 2014
- Country: United States, (US and France editions)
- Language: English
- Website: smartplanet.com

SmartPlanet was an online magazine that covered clean technology and information technology as it related to healthcare, science, transportation, corporate sustainability, architecture, and design. It was part of the business portfolio of CBS Interactive that included BNET and ZDNet and was known for its daily coverage of the technology and energy industries. It stopped publishing on June 30, 2014.

== History ==
SmartPlanet logo circa 2008

SmartPlanet logo circa 2009

SmartPlanet's homepage in 2008

The site was first launched by Ziff Davis on November 2, 1999 as an online educational service and "personal learning community" focused on the technology industry.

After CNET Networks acquired Ziff Davis and subsidiary ZDNet in 2000, SmartPlanet was relaunched in 2001 as a paid learning service for IT professionals.

In 2008, it was relaunched as a U.K.-based eco-friendly, green lifestyle publication that featured reviews of sustainable and ethical products. It was edited by Adam Vaughan, who is now energy correspondent of The Guardian.

In June 2009, SmartPlanet was relocated to the U.S. and revamped as a business-centric publication led by ZDNet editor-in-chief Larry Dignan. It stopped publishing on June 30, 2014, and its staff and content were merged with ZDNet.

== Editorial coverage ==
SmartPlanet's homepage in 2010

At launch in 2009, SmartPlanet was divided into three sections: Smart Business, Smart Technology and Smart People.

=== Blogs ===
Within SmartPlanet's sections were several blogs:

- Business Brains, which covers cities, transportation and corporate sustainability.
- Intelligent Energy, which covers clean technology.
- Pure Genius, which profiles the inventors and thought leaders behind innovation.
- Rethinking Healthcare, which covers health technology and policy.
- Science Scope, which covers scientific discoveries.
- Thinking Tech, which covers aerospace, automotive, military, supercomputers and other applied technology.
- Solving Cities, which covers urban planning, public works infrastructure, government 2.0 initiatives and green building.
- Transport Theory, which covers various modes of transportation and the systems and infrastructure that support them.
- Smart Takes, an editor's blog with daily news and opinion items.

Its blogs were eliminated in a 2013 redesign and rebranding that recategorized the content into news ("The Latest," formerly called "The Bulletin") and features ("The Issue").

=== Video ===
SmartPlanet regularly produced original video on new technologies, innovators and industry conferences on sustainability, energy and green technology.

The site's occasional series called "The Future Of..." was known for featuring real-world applications of new technologies that redefine existing products or services, such as diabetic monitors, bus stops and hospitals.

In 2011, the series won the Jesse H. Neal National Business Journalism Award for "Best Use of Video" by a B2B trade publication.

== See also ==
- BNET
- CBS Interactive
- CBS MoneyWatch
- CBS News
- CNET
- TechRepublic
- ZDNet
