= St. Mary's Church, Red Deer =

Catholic church in Red Deer, Alberta

Coordinates: 52.258684°N 113.782075°W

St. Mary's Church
- Immaculate Conception of the Blessed Virgin Mary
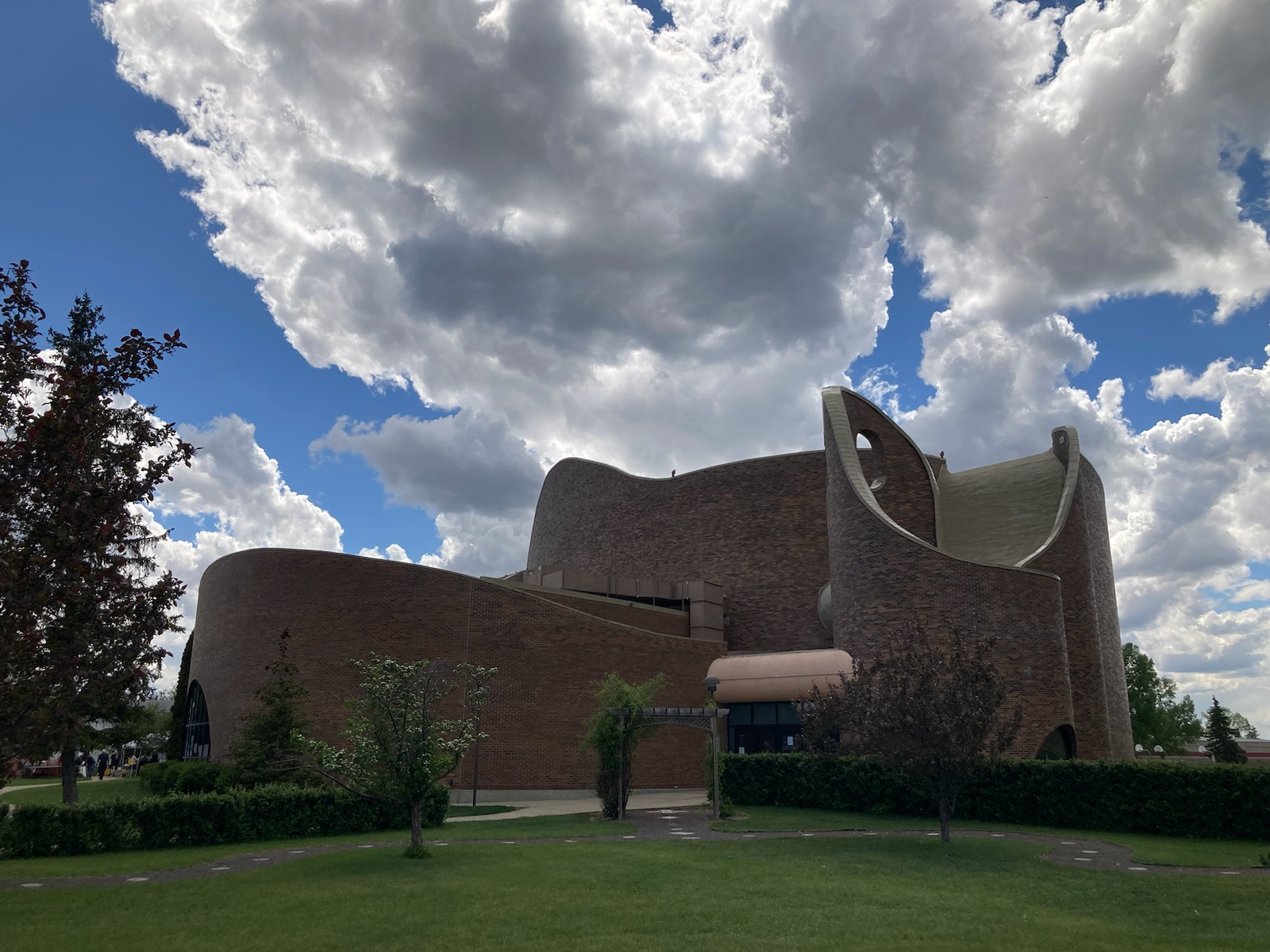
- Location: Red Deer, Alberta
- Address: 6 McMillan Avenue
- Denomination: Catholic
- Website: stmarysparishredeer.ca

History
- Dedication: 8 December 1968

Architecture
- Architect: Douglas Cardinal
- Groundbreaking: 22 June 1966

Administration
- Archdiocese: Roman Catholic Archdiocese of Edmonton

St. Mary's Church, formally the Immaculate Conception of the Blessed Virgin Mary, is a Catholic parish church in Red Deer, Alberta. The church is part of the Roman Catholic Archdiocese of Edmonton and opened in 1968. It is most notable as the first building designed by Douglas Cardinal.

== History ==
St. Mary's was the second Catholic parish in Red Deer and was formed as an outgrowth of the Sacred Heart parish. The new parish was formed in October 1963 as St. Thomas Aquinas Parish, and received its current name in September 1964. The parish hired architect Douglas Cardinal to design its church. Cardinal, who had grown up near Red Deer, had at the time just opened an independent practice. Cardinal designed an expressionist structure made of brick that was intended to respond to the modernisations of the Second Vatican Council. Construction began in 1966 and the church opened officially in 1968.
