= Seema Goel =

- Education: McGill University, Ontario College of Art and Design, Rhode Island School of Design
- Website: seemagoel.com

Seema Goel is a Canadian artist, curator, writer, educator, and environmental scientist. She is known for multidisciplinary art and writing bridging art and science, her work with communities tying craft to climate change activism, and her efforts to engage the public in science through the arts. Her layered perspective as a first generation Canadian navigating the post-colonial experience, as well as her ability to traverse and connect art and science, are profound influences on her approach to making. Understanding and challenging the lens through which the world is viewed are primary to her process.

== Biography ==
Goel holds a B.Sc. in biology from McGill University, an Associate Arts diploma in ceramics, glass, and sculpture from the Ontario College of Art and Design, and an MFA in sculpture from the Rhode Island School of Design. She is currently completing an interdisciplinary MSc between engineering and aesthetics. From 2015-2020 she was the Science Technology Engineering Art and Math (STEAM) and Outreach Coordinator for the Faculty of Science at the University of Manitoba a post unique in Canada which positions art as fundamental to the creative thinking required to excel within and propel the sciences. During this time she also served as the Science Rendezvous Winnipeg Co-Director and by re-orienting it to STEAM principles successfully grew the festival by 25 times capacity; in 2019 it was led by 800 student volunteers who welcomed 8000 visitors to campus over 3 days.

Goel has been actively exhibiting since 1997 and has shown Canada, the United States, Ireland, and Spain. She employs an eclectic range of materials including (but not limited to) glass, ceramics, robotics, responsive technologies, projection, taxidermy, and wool. Her work often employs humour and tactile engagement to hook audiences into the work, and from there allows the plumbing of larger themes. She is noted for her collaborative and community based projects which invite shared ownership of projects, and which frequently bring non-artists into the world of making.

From December 13, 2000 - January 27, 2001 Goel was part of a multi-artist show called Strangers In a Strange Land. The title of the show comes from the American writer Robert A. Heinlein and specifically refers to his work about a "young Earthling who is forced to negotiate two different physical and cultural terrains." Other artists from the show included Eveline Boudreau, Rigmor Clarke, Felipe Diaz, Zhong-Yang Huang, Yuji Komiya, Jeannie Mah, Jeff Nachtigall, Zarqa Nawaz, Taras Polataiko and Amira Wasify. Strangers In a Strange Land was curated by Jack Anderson. The artists were all living and working in Saskatchewan at the time of the exhibition and were either immigrants or first generation Canadians. Works displayed spoke to how the individual artists experienced split-ethnicity. ex-marks the spot, Goel's piece, was mixed media installation and featured a Middle Eastern carpet the viewer would step upon which then activated a super-8 film projection in front of them. The film component included a reference to Dorothy from the Wizard of Oz and called up the idea of "home" as a personal, nostalgic, fiction. ex-marks the spot mimics the feeling of dislocation that an immigrant feels on their journey.

Goel was part of 2011's Any Sharp Knife Will Do which included work by Jeff Nye, Bruce Johnson, Ian Carr-Harris, and Lee Henderson. The exhibition dealt with death and decay and focused on creating a space of contradiction. The show was "not aggressive, but confusing, beautiful and transgressive." As part of the exhibition Seema Goel wrote How I Became a Cannibal.

Seema Goel was one of the speakers at "Who Counts? A Feminist Showdown." This event was Winnipeg artist-run centre's mentorship program Mentoring Artists for Women's Art (MAWA) 30th anniversary symposium. Goel, along with artist Amy Fung, "drove home the intersections of race and class with gendered oppression as the “yes” side of the “Is Art Gendered?” debate."

From September 17, 2005 - October 23, 2005 Goel's work was featured in another multi-artist show called Blown. Other artists included were Ana Rewakowicz, Max Streicher and Robert Zingone. Blown showed how artists could use inflatable forms and pneumatic systems in their works. Goel's pieces were Excitatory response; action potential and aspiration.

Goel portrays human-human, human-animal and human-place relationships. She examines how humans interact with one another and the world around them. There is a special emphasis on human's "abilities to engage with, change, and manipulate".

== Works ==
- Birds Vs Windows
- Flock Together
- Murmur
- Any Sharp Knife Will Do
- Carbon Footprint Project
- Happy Birthday to DNA (2005)
- ex-marks the spot (2000)
- excitatory response; action potential (2005)
- aspiration (2005)
