= BNET =

Online magazine about business management

- Division of: CBS Interactive
- Key people: Eric Schurenberg; Editor-in-Chief
- Founded: 2007
- Headquarters: San Francisco, California, United States
- Area served: Worldwide
- Industry: Business, News
- Website: http://www.bnet.com
- Finaldate: 2012

BNET was an online magazine dedicated to issues of business management.

It was owned by CBS Interactive and was a part of its business portfolio alongside ZDNet, TechRepublic, SmartPlanet.

BNET site registration allowed users to receive several e-newsletters, download certain whitepapers, and post comments on their site. BNET was one of the top 10 financial news & research sites on the Internet from May 2007 to May 2008, according to comScore's rankings. In 2012, BNET was merged into CBS MoneyWatch.com.
