= Douglas Cardinal =

Canadian architect (born 1934)

Douglas Cardinal OC FRAIC
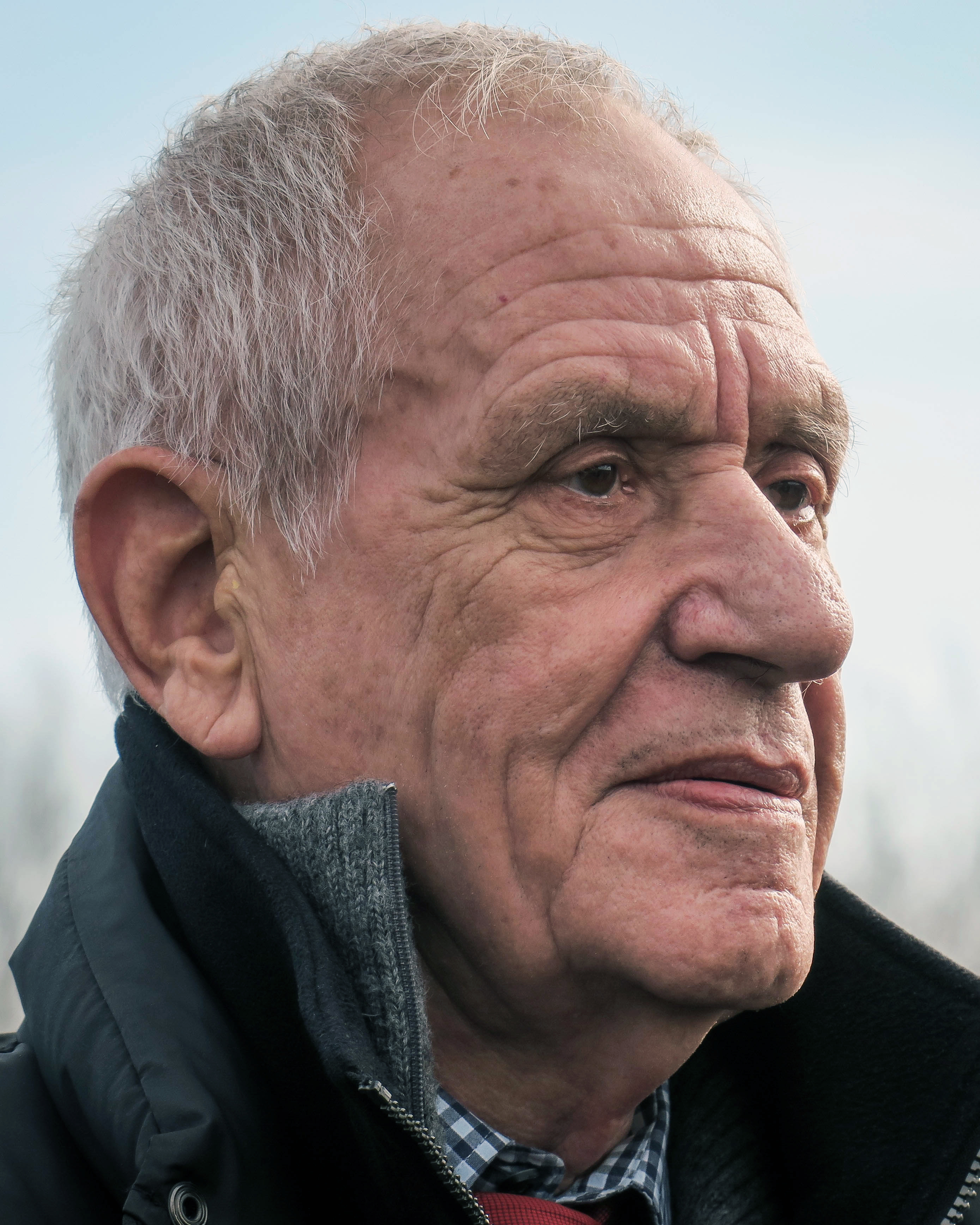
- Cardinal in 2016
- Born: Douglas Joseph Cardinal; 7 March 1934 (age 92); Calgary, Alberta, Canada
- Education: University of British Columbia; University of Texas at Austin
- Occupation: Architect
- Awards: Gold Medal of the Royal Architectural Institute of Canada; Queen Elizabeth II Golden Jubilee Medal; Governor General’s Award in Visual and Media Arts
- Projects: National Museum of the American Indian; Grande Prairie Regional College; Canadian Museum of History

Douglas Joseph Cardinal OC FRAIC (born 7 March 1934) is a Canadian architect based in Ottawa, Ontario. His architecture is influenced by his Indigenous heritage, as well as European Expressionist architecture. Cardinal designed the Canadian Museum of History in Gatineau, Quebec, and the National Museum of the American Indian in Washington, DC.

== Life ==
Born in Calgary, Alberta, to parents Joseph and Frances Cardinal, Douglas Cardinal is the oldest of eight children. He is a member of the Siksika Nation. His father was of Siksika (Blackfoot), French, and Ojibwe heritage, while his mother was of German, French and Mohawk/Métis descent. His mother worked as a nurse and was well educated.

Cardinal's parents met in 1926. Despite the limited rights of women in the early 20th century, which discouraged women's education, the matrilineal culture of Cardinal's father's tribe accepted Cardinal's mother. These cultural ideas shaped Cardinal's upbringing and affected his worldview and relationship with his heritage. He has recalled that his mother told him at a young age, "You’re going to be an architect."

Cardinal grew up just a few miles outside the small city of Red Deer, Alberta. He attended St. Joseph's Convent Catholic, a boarding school designed for rural children who wanted to continue their education beyond Grade 8—the highest level offered by most one-room country schools at the time. He completed high school there. The school was run by the Daughters of Wisdom who were highly regarded for teaching both Catholic and Protestant students.

Like many boarders, Cardinal was introduced to the arts and culture by the Sisters. He later credited the school with having a profound influence on his development. Exposure to traditional architecture and its cultural significance inspired Cardinal to design spaces similar to churches and basilicas.

=== University ===
In 1953, he started studying architecture at the University of British Columbia (UBC) but was forced to leave two years later due to his radical ideas. Cardinal's architectural approach was to create buildings that responded to nature, which did not align with the ideas of modernism that were prominent in the 1950s.

In his third year of studies, he was told by the director of UBC that he had the "wrong background" for the program and the profession. Cardinal left UBC and returned to Red Deer to start working at local architectural firms as a draftsman. In response to anti-Indigenous racism at the time, Cardinal eventually left Canada for Arizona and Mexico, and later settled in Texas.

He attended the University of Texas at Austin, from which he graduated with a degree in architecture in 1963. He also studied cultural anthropology.

=== Inspirations ===
Cardinal's philosophy was inspired by architect Rudolph Steiner, who he studied at the University of Texas. Steiner's work led Cardinal to study anthropomorphism, which he applied to his work. The idea of anthropomorphism and its concept of responding to human behavior, natural cycles of life, and land tectonics aligned with Cardinal's cultural heritage.

Another inspiration for Cardinal was the work of Frank Lloyd Wright. Cardinal appreciated Wright's way of responding to the landscape with the use of natural materials, such as stone and brick.

== Career ==
Cardinal opened his private practice in 1964. That same year, he was commissioned to design St. Mary's Church in Red Deer, Alberta. Construction was completed in 1968. It has since been recognized as a prominent example in the history of Canadian architecture. In 2007, the church was featured on a Canada Post stamp series featuring four Canadian architects to commemorate the centennial of the Royal Architectural Institute of Canada (RAIC).

Beginning with his work at St. Mary's, Cardinal was one of the first North American architects to use computers to assist in the design process. Cardinal used 3D design programs to lay out the exact dimensions of buildings and help shape his curvilinear designs to the landscape around them.

In 1993, he was hired by the Smithsonian Institution as the Primary Design Architect for the National Museum of the American Indian (NMAI). The NMAI is currently situated on the National Mall in Washington, D.C., and is directly across from the Capitol of the United States of America. After contractual disputes, Cardinal was removed from the project in 1998 before it was completed, but he continued to provide input into the building's design.

In 2008, his firm was hired by the Kirkland Foundation to design a museum/convention centre in Union City, Tennessee. The Discovery Park of America was intended to be a unique structure housing a multilevel museum, with artifacts from across the nation, as well as large mixed-use community spaces. However, in early 2009, the firm's contract was terminated and all construction activity was halted.

=== Architectural style and philosophy ===
Throughout his early years, Cardinal dealt with racism and pressure to conform to mainstream architectural styles. He did not fully embrace his Indigenous heritage until moving to Texas. In 1970s, Cardinal developed his trademark architectural style with organic curvilinear forms. In those years, he also started wearing native clothes and necklaces and became an advocate for Indigenous rights.

Cardinal's connection to his native cultural background influenced his architectural approach. His work explores the relationship between humans, the environment, and the passage of time. Cardinal uses natural materials, organic shapes, and soil and sun studies. As part of his native philosophy, Cardinal's architecture aims to last for seven generations, as opposed to the economically driven and efficient approach of the patriarchal society.

=== St. Mary's Church ===
St. Mary's Church in Red Deer, Alberta is Cardinal's first building. Upon his return to Alberta, Cardinal met with Father Werner Merx, who wanted the new church to be innovative and unique. The archbishop of the church, Anthony Jordan, had already appointed another architect for the job, but Merx insisted on hiring Cardinal and realizing his vision. Archbishop Jordan had helped resolve a legal case for Cardinal 10 years earlier and approved Cardinal for the job.

Cardinal start the project in 1967. Despite initial challenges, St. Mary's Church became one of his most iconic designs. The church has 750 seats inside and includes tubular skylights for natural daylight. Its blend of natural organic forms was considered unprecedented for the time.

=== Canadian Museum of History ===
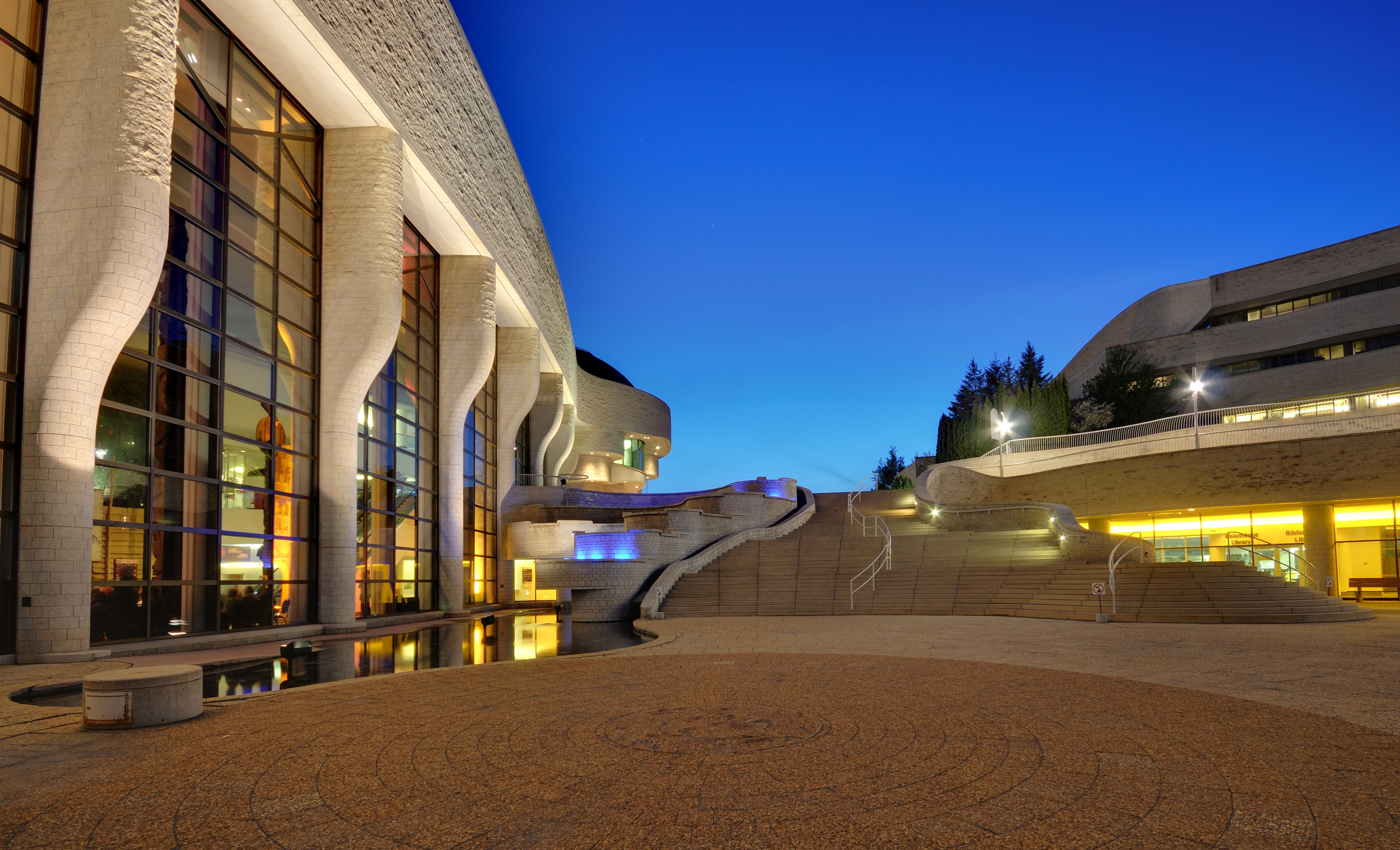
Canadian Museum of History

The Canadian Museum of Civilization, which opened in 1989, is another project that reflects Cardinal's architectural style. The building is located on the banks of the Ottawa River, facing Parliament Hill. Whereas the government buildings in the city centre face away from the river, Cardinal designed the Museum of Civilization building to face the river. He also included a curvilinear facade that wraps around the environment. The envelope of the building is shaped in an organic form that mimics many shapes commonly found in nature.

In appreciation for the neighboring Parliament buildings, Cardinal used the same limestone material to construct the museum. The museum also engages with its historical context by including totem poles and native murals inside the building. Cardinal wanted the space inside to feel alive and dynamic. Former prime minister Pierre Trudeau also encouraged Cardinal to create a museum where people embrace their different backgrounds and learn from each other. Trudeau's idea for a multicultural Canadian society aligned well with Cardinal's vision.

However, in 1984 the new Brian Mulroney government did not approve Cardinal's design. He lost his team on the project and was not fully paid for his previous work. However, Cardinal was dedicated to completing the building. He eventually finished the museum and it became one of his many fundamental projects.

=== Architectural peers ===
Cardinal was part of a community that included some of Canada's most influential architects, such as Moshe Safdie, Raymond Moriyama, Eberhard Zeidler, Arthur Erickson, Ray Affleck and Ron Thom. Although the members' styles and conceptual vision were different, they all agreed on a shared vision of architecture that conveyed meaning and beauty, rather than the commercial style of the era.

However, Cardinal struggled with personal and financial problems, and consequently he did not receive as much recognition as his peers.

== Works ==
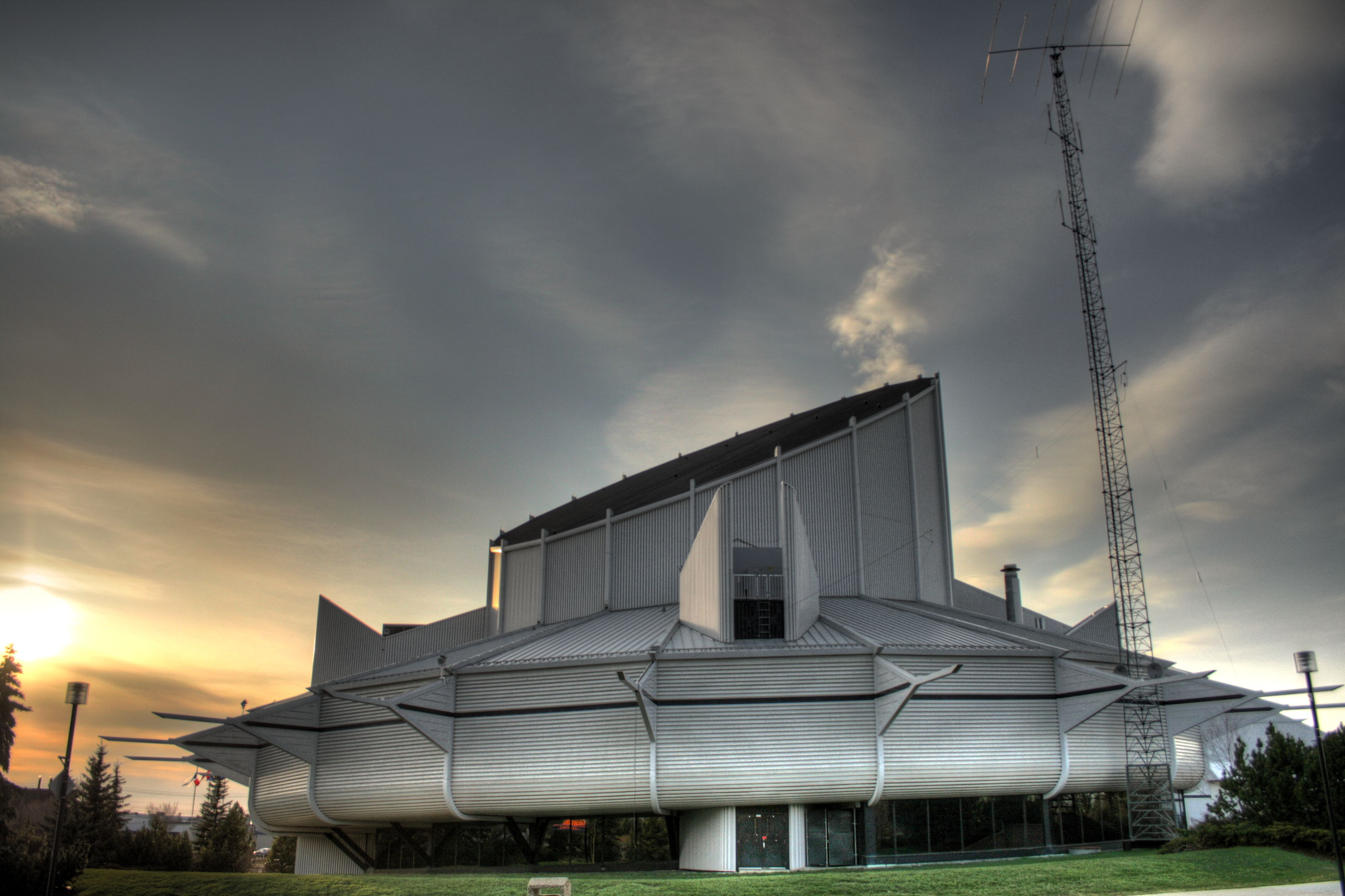
Edmonton Space And Science Centre (1984)

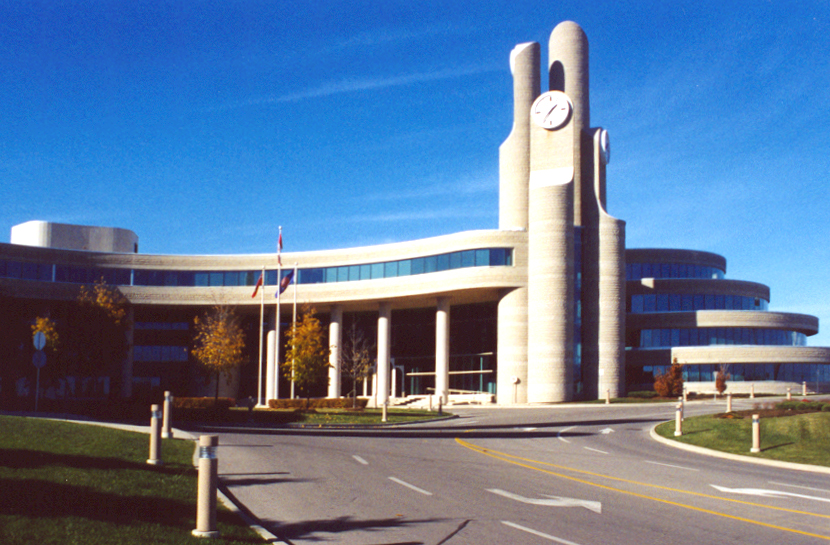
York Region Administrative Centre (1992)

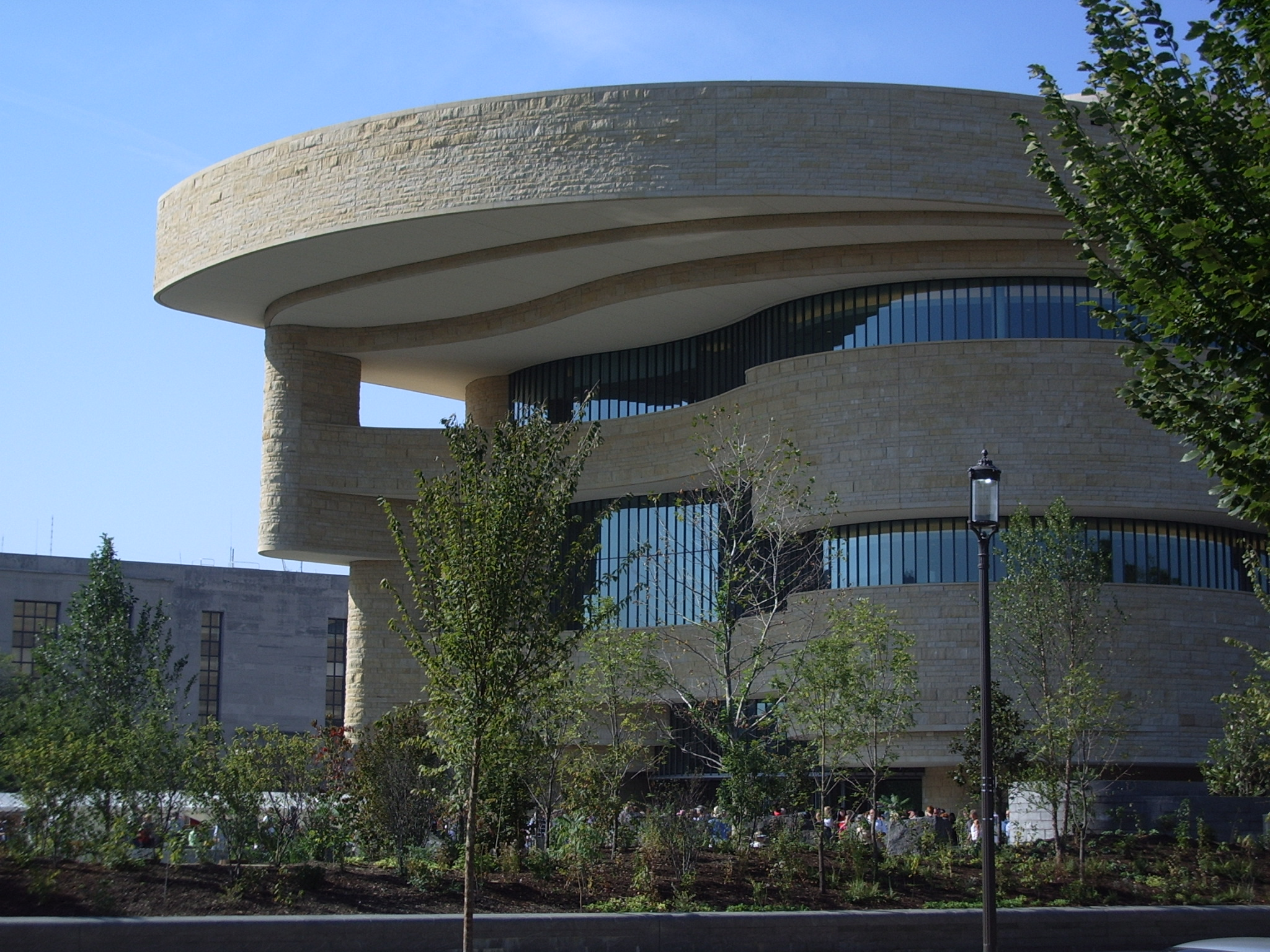
Smithsonian National Museum of the American Indian (1993–1998)

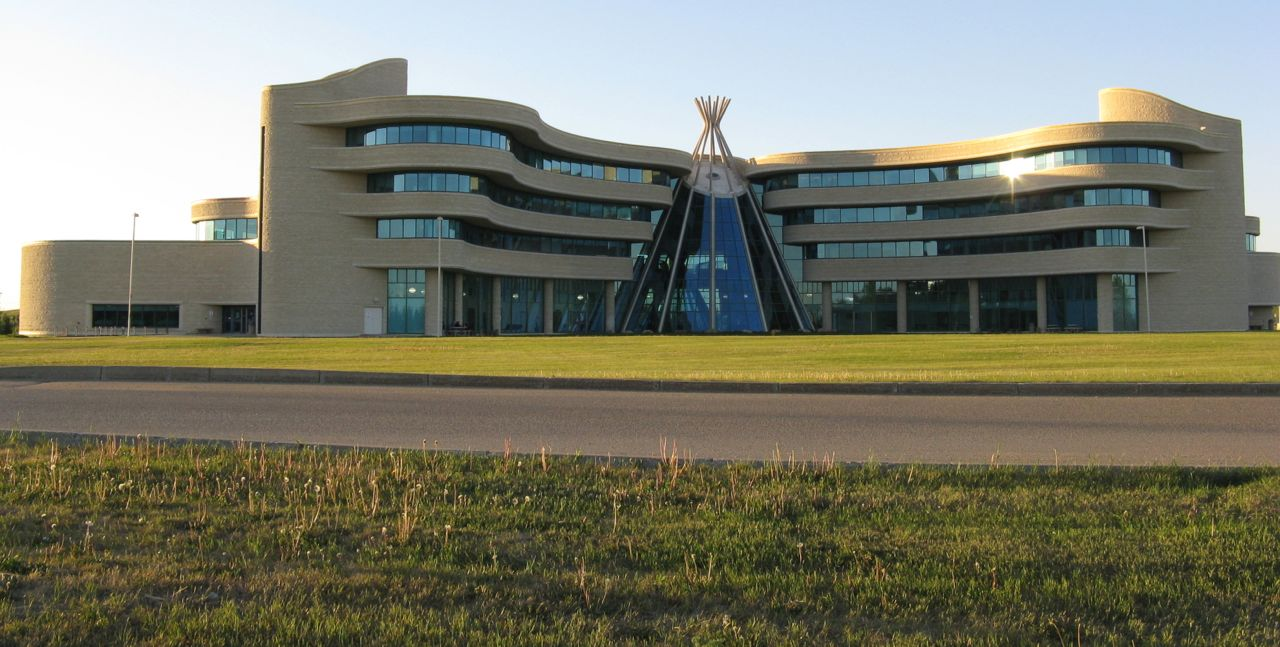
First Nations University (2003)

Among the many projects Cardinal has completed in his career are the following:

- St. Mary's Church (1968) Red Deer, Alberta
- Diamond Jenness Secondary School (1972) Hay River, Northwest Territories
- Fairview Elementary School (1975) Red Deer, Alberta
- Alberta Government Services (Provincial) Building (1976) Ponoka, Alberta
- Grande Prairie Regional College (1976) Grande Prairie, Alberta
- Precam Elementary School (1976) La Ronge, Saskatchewan
- St. Albert Place & City Hall (1976) St. Albert, Alberta
- Grotski Residence (1978) Edmonton, Alberta
- Spruce Grove City Hall (1981) in Spruce Grove, Alberta
- Spruce Grove Composite High School (1982) Spruce Grove, Alberta
- Cardinal Residence (1982) Stony Plain, Alberta
- Edmonton Space And Science Centre (1984) Coronation Park, Edmonton, Alberta, which has since been renovated and rebranded as the Telus World of Science
- Leighton Artist Colony, at the Banff Centre (1985) Banff, Alberta
- Sioux Valley (1986) Sioux Valley, Manitoba
- Canadian Museum of History (1989) in Gatineau, Quebec, opposite Parliament Hill
- Jehovah's Witnesses Kingdom Hall (1991) Gatineau, Quebec
- York Region Administrative Centre (1992) in Newmarket, Ontario
- Kainai Middle School (1996) Sioux Valley, Manitoba
- National Museum of the American Indian (1993–1998) Washington
- Circle of Life Thunderbird Place (2001) Winnipeg, Manitoba
- First Nations University (2003) in Regina, Saskatchewan
- Me-No-Ya Win Health Centre (2010) Sioux lookout, Ontario
- Wabano Centre (2013) Ottawa, Ontario
- Gordon Oakes Red Bear Centre (2016) at the University of Saskatchewan in Saskatoon, Saskatchewan
- Unceded: Voices of the Land Exhibition (2018) at the Venice Biennale
- Adelante Healthcare Goodyear Project (2018) Mesa, Arizona
- Long Point First Nation, Winneway, Quebec
- Iskotew Healing Lodge, Ottawa, Ontario
- Bonneville Rehabilitation Centre, Bonnyville, Alberta
- Ojigkwanong Students Centre, Carleton University, Ottawa, Ontario
- Ile a la Crosse Elementary School, Île-à-la-Crosse, Saskatchewan
- Cardinal Studio Sudbury, Ontario
- Oujé-Bougoumou Village, Oujé-Bougoumou, Quebec
- Janvier Gallery, Cold Lake, Alberta
- Grand Traverse Civic Centre, Grand Traverse County, Michigan, USA

== Achievements ==
=== Writings ===
- Of the Spirit, NeWest Press (Edmonton, Alberta, Canada), 1977.
- (With Trevor Boddy) The Architecture of Douglas Cardinal, NeWest Press (Edmonton, Alberta, Canada), 1989.
- (With Jeanette C. Armstrong) The Native Creative Process, Theytus Books, 1994.

=== Awards ===
In 2005 Cardinal was awarded The Distinguished Artist Award from the Lieutenant Governor of Alberta for "creating an indigenous style of Canadian architecture, characterized by gracious organic forms, which continually challenged the most advanced engineering standards".

- Honor award, Alberta Association of Architects, 1968;
- Honor award, City of Red Deer, Alberta, 1969;
- Award of Excellence, City of Red Deer, Alberta, 1978;
- Award of Excellence, Canadian Architect, 1972;
- Member, Royal Canadian Academy of Arts, 1974;
- Achievement of Excellence Award in Architecture, Province of Alberta, 1974;
- Fellow, Royal Architectural Institute of Canada, 1983;
- Banff Centre National Arts Award, 1990;
- Canada Council Molson Prize for the Arts, 1993;
- Aboriginal Achievement Award, 1995;
- RAIC Gold Medal for Architectural Achievement, 1999;
- Royal Architectural Institute of Canada, Millennium Celebration of Architecture, St. Mary’s Church, Alberta, 2000;
- Juan Torres Higueras Award, Federation of Pan American Associations of Architects, 2000;
- Governor General’s Award in Visual and Media Arts, Ottawa, Ontario, 2001;
- Best Building Award, Grand Traverse Centre, United Contractor of America, 2002;
- United Nations Award for Sustainable Design, Oujé-Bougoumou Village, Quebec, 2002;
- Golden Jubilee Medal in honor of Her Majesty The Queen’s 50th Anniversary, Ottawa, Ontario, 2002;
- "Douglas J. Cardinal Performing Arts Centre" opens in GRPC, Grand Prairie, Alberta, 2004;
- Laureate, Canada Council of the Arts, 2004;
- Presidential Award, Masonry Design Awards, First Nations University, 2005;
- Lieutenant Governor of Alberta Excellence in the Arts Award, Banff, Alberta, 2005;
- Outstanding Professional Achievement Award, American Society of Landscape Architects, 2006;
- "World Master of Contemporary Architecture" by the IAA, Sofia, Bulgaria, 2006;
- Outstanding Professional Achievement Award, American Society of Landscape Architects, 2006;
- Canada Post postage stamp - Douglas Cardinal and St. Mary's Church - commemorating RAIC's 100th Anniversary, 2007;
- IAA Grand Prix Crystal Globe, 2009;
- St. Albert Place and City Hall declared ‘Municipal Historic Resource’, 2009;
- Gold Medal of the Union of Architects of Russia, Moscow, Russia, 2009;
- Best Public Services Development in Canada Meno-Ya-Win Health Centre, International Property Awards, Essex, United Kingdom, 2009;
- Alberta Masonry Design "Lifetime Achievement" Award, 2010;
- Wood WORKS! "Northern Ontario Excellence" Award for Sioux Lookout Meno-Ya-Win Health Centre, 2011;
- Ontario Wood Works "Northern Ontario Excellence Award" for Meno-Ya-Win Health Centre, 2012;
- RAIC-NSAA Le Prix du XXe siècle for Grand Prairie Regional College, 2013;
- Presidential Award from the Saskatchewan Masonry Institute for Gordon Oaks Red Bear Student Centre in Saskatoon, Saskatchewan, 2016;

== Personal life ==
Cardinal has been married four times and has eight children. After his return to Red Deer, Douglas Cardinal met his former high school sweetheart Deirdre. Her Irish Catholic family did not accept their relationship because of his heritage, so the pair eloped. They had one daughter.

Because interracial marriages were illegal at the time, charges were pressed against Cardinal. Lawyer and archbishop Anthony Jordan defended Cardinal, who was found not guilty. However, Deirdre's family pressured her to move home, where she raised her and Cardinal's daughter alone.

Shortly before moving to the United States, Cardinal started a relationship with Carole Olson, who accompanied him on a road trip 1957 to Texas where they were later married. The couple had three children, Nancy, Guy and Bret. The couple later divorced due to Cardinal's preoccupation with work.

He married Marylin Zahar in 1973, with whom he had two children, Lisa and Jean-Marc.

His fourth and current wife, Idoia Arana-Beobide, is of Basque origin and 30 years his junior. They met in 1988 while Cardinal was working on the Canadian Museum of History. At the time, she was a tour guide for the museum and an international student taking a museum studies course at a local community college. Cardinal and Arana-Beobide have two children, Aritz and Lorea, and reside in Ottawa. Arana-Beobide works as a director at his architectural firm.

== Bibliography ==
Hall, J. (July 14, 2014). The Outsider: How Douglas Cardinal Draws Genius from Native Roots. Toronto, ON: Toronto Newspapers Limited. ISBN 9780887858017.

Douglas Cardinal. (2018). The Canadian Architect, 63(2), 30–32.

Douglas Joseph Cardinal. (2016). Gale Literature: Contemporary Authors, Gale. Gale Literature Resource Center.

Cardinal, D. J. (1998). Architecture as a living process. Canadian Journal of Native Education, 22(1), 3.

Liscombe, R. (2003). Cardinal, Douglas. Grove Art Online. Retrieved on 2020-03-30 from https://www.oxfordartonline.com/groveart/view/10.1093/gao/9781884446054.001.0001/oao-9781884446054-e-7000014003.
