= Telus Spark Science Centre =

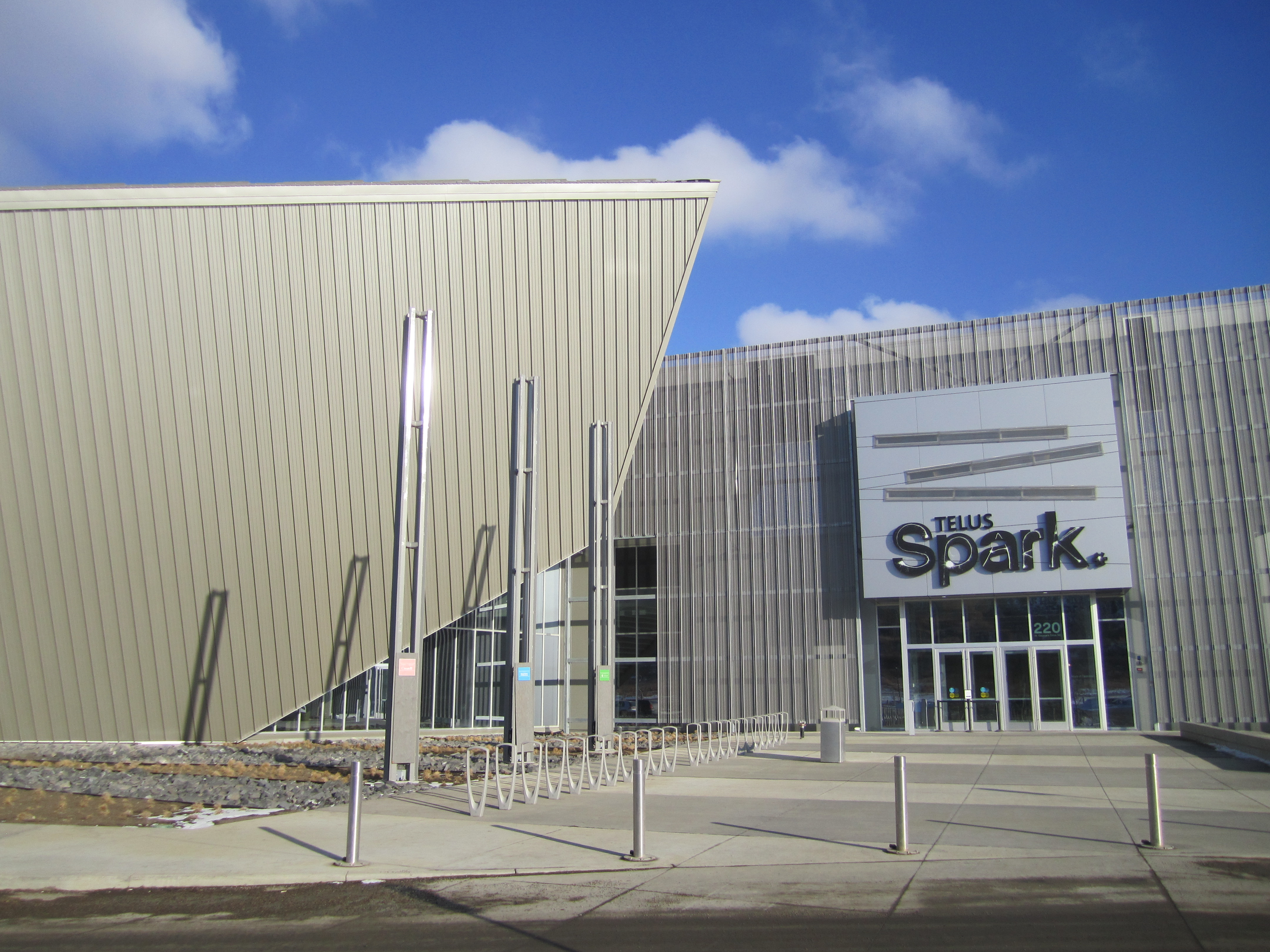

- Location in Calgary
- Former name: Telus World of Science Calgary (2005-2011)
- Established: October 29, 2011
- Location: 220 St. George's Drive NE, Calgary, Alberta
- Coordinates: 51.053899°N 114.024611°W
- Type: Science museum
- Visitors: 431,262 (2016)
- Website: https://www.sparkscience.ca

Telus Spark Science Centre is a science museum with interactive exhibits, multimedia presentations and educational demonstrations in Calgary, Alberta, Canada. There are more than 430,000 visitors annually, including over 82,000 students.

The science museum was established in 1987 as the Calgary Science Centre. The science centre was later re-branded Telus World of Science – Calgary in 2005. In 2011, the science centre moved locations from the former Centennial Planetarium to the Nose Creek Valley. The science centre was re-branded to Telus Spark during the move.

== History ==
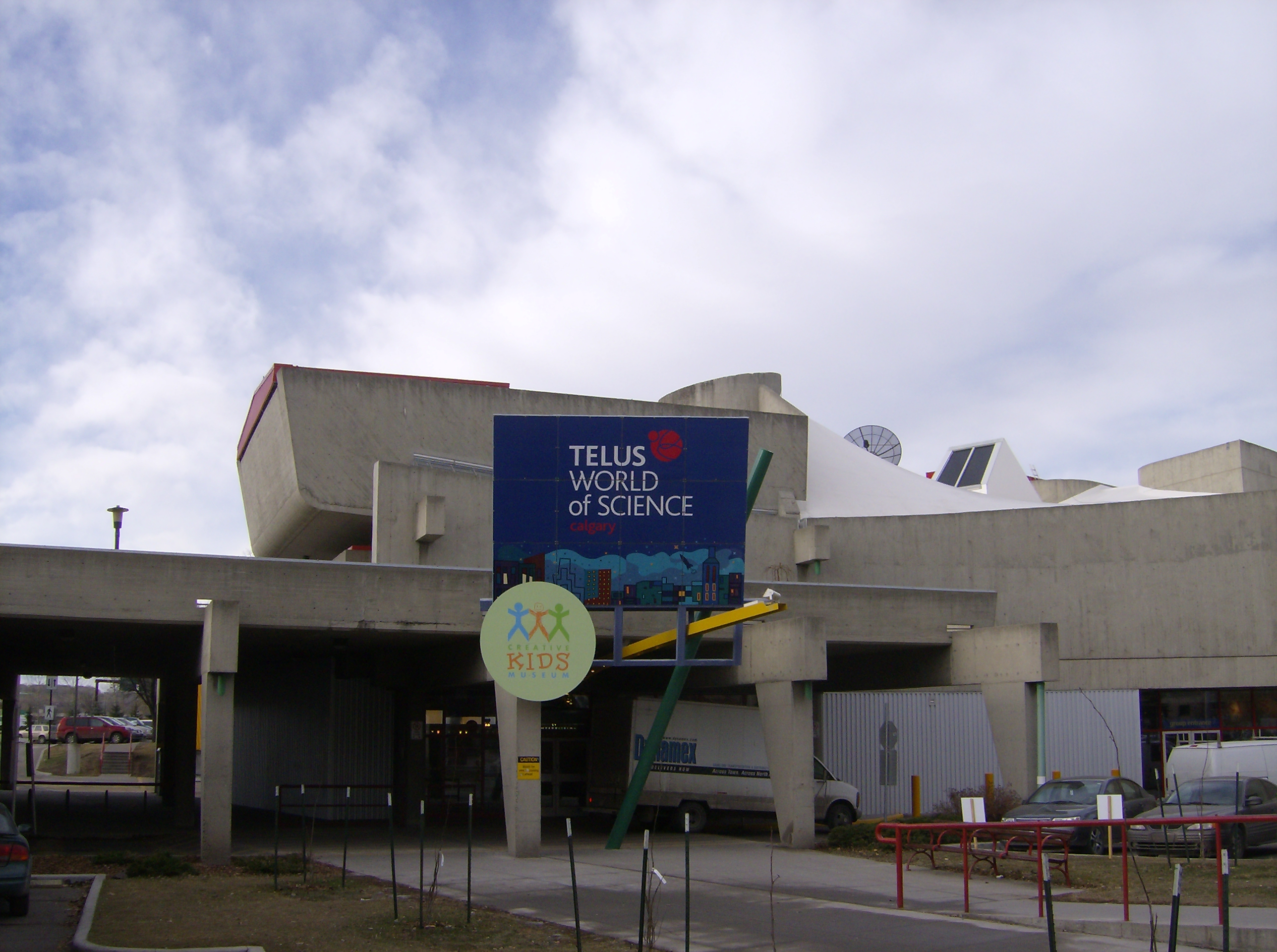
The science museum was located in the former Centennial Planetarium building from 1967 to 2011

The science centre originally opened as the Calgary Centennial Planetarium on July 1, 1967. In 1983 the Calgary Science Centre Society began a bid to bring a science centre to Calgary and in 1987 they received an operating agreement that would transform the planetarium into the Calgary Science Centre.

The Calgary Science Centre was renamed Telus World of Science – Calgary after a $9 million donation from Telus on April 27, 2005.

The original site, located on 11 Street SW in Calgary's Downtown West End, closed on June 27, 2011, and was replaced by a new science centre called Telus Spark. The new science centre is located on a 15-acre (61,000 m^{2}) site at 220 St. Georges Drive NE in Nose Creek Valley, north of the Wilder Institute/Calgary Zoo. Telus Spark opened on October 29, 2011.

=== COVID-19 crisis ===
In response to the COVID-19 pandemic, Telus Spark was awarded $381,414 by the Government of Canada to promote uptake of COVID-19 vaccines among indigenous youth, communities and leaders using online education and hip hop music.

== See also ==
- Telus World of Science (disambiguation)
- List of science centers
