= List of astronomical observatories in Canada =

Astronomical Observatories in Canada

== Alberta ==
- Newbrook Observatory (disused)
- Oldman River Observatory, Lethbridge Astronomical Society, Lethbridge
- Rothney Astrophysical Observatory, University of Calgary, Priddis, Alberta
- Sulphur Mountain Cosmic Ray Station (historic site)
- Sunridge Observatory, south of Medicine Hat
- Telus World of Science Edmonton RASC Observatory, Edmonton
- Wilson Coulee Observatory, RASC Calgary Centre, De Winton, Alberta
- Eagle Butte Observatory, South of Dunmore

== British Columbia ==
- Dominion Radio Astrophysical Observatory, Penticton
- Mount Kobau National Observatory, Mount Kobau (Never built)
- University of British Columbia Observatory, Vancouver (Demolished 2010)
- Dominion Astrophysical Observatory, Herzberg Institute of Astrophysics, Victoria
- University of Victoria Observatory, Victoria
- Climenhaga Observatory, University of Victoria
- Gordon MacMillan Southam Observatory, H.R. Macmillan Space Centre, Vancouver
- Large Zenith Telescope, University of British Columbia (at Malcolm Knapp Research Forest) (Decommissioned 2014)
- Trottier Observatory, Simon Fraser University, Burnaby
- Prince George Astronomical Observatory, Prince George

== Manitoba ==
- Glenlea Astronomical Observatory, Univ. of Manitoba/RASC Winnipeg Centre, Winnipeg

== New Brunswick ==
- Université de Moncton observatory
- Mount Allison University Gemini Observatory
- Moncton High School Observatory

== Newfoundland and Labrador ==
- Grenfell Observatory

== Nova Scotia ==
- Burke-Gaffney Observatory

== Ontario ==
- Algonquin Radio Observatory, Algonquin Provincial Park
- Boltwood Observatory, Stittsville
- David Dunlap Observatory, Richmond Hill
- David Thompson Astronomical Observatory, Fort William Historical Park, Thunder Bay
- Dominion Meteorological Building, 315 Bloor Street West, Toronto - now home to Munk School of Global Affairs
- Dominion Observatory, Ottawa
- Elginfield Astronomical Observatory, Middlesex Centre
- Gustav Bakos Observatory, University of Waterloo, Waterloo
- Hume Cronyn Memorial Observatory, University of Western Ontario, London
- Kessler Observatory, Carleton University, Ottawa
- Killarney Provincial Park Observatory
- Long Point Observatory, St. Williams
- Queen's University Observatory, Queen's University, Kingston
- Sudbury Neutrino Observatory, Sudbury
- Toronto Magnetic and Meteorological Observatory
- York University Observatory, North York (Toronto)

== Quebec ==
- ASTER Observatory, Saint-Louis-du-Ha! Ha!
- Bishop's University Astronomical Observatory
- Mont Mégantic Observatory

== Saskatchewan ==
- Cypress Observatory, Cypress Hills Interprovincial Park Centre Block, Maple Creek
- Davin Observatory, RASC Regina Centre, Davin
- Saskatchewan Science Centre Observatory, Regina
- Sleaford Observatory, RASC Saskatoon Centre, north of Colonsay
- Super Dual Auroral Radar Network (SuperDARN), University of Saskatchewan
- University of Saskatchewan Observatory, Saskatoon
- Wilkinson Memorial Observatory, Eastend

== See also ==
- List of observatories
