= October 1964 =

Month of 1964

| << | October 1964 | | | | | >> |
| Su | Mo | Tu | We | Th | Fr | Sa |
| | | | | 1 | 2 | 3 |
| 4 | 5 | 6 | 7 | 8 | 9 | 10 |
| 11 | 12 | 13 | 14 | 15 | 16 | 17 |
| 18 | 19 | 20 | 21 | 22 | 23 | 24 |
| 25 | 26 | 27 | 28 | 29 | 30 | 31 |

October 10–24, 1964: First autumn Summer Olympics are held in Tokyo

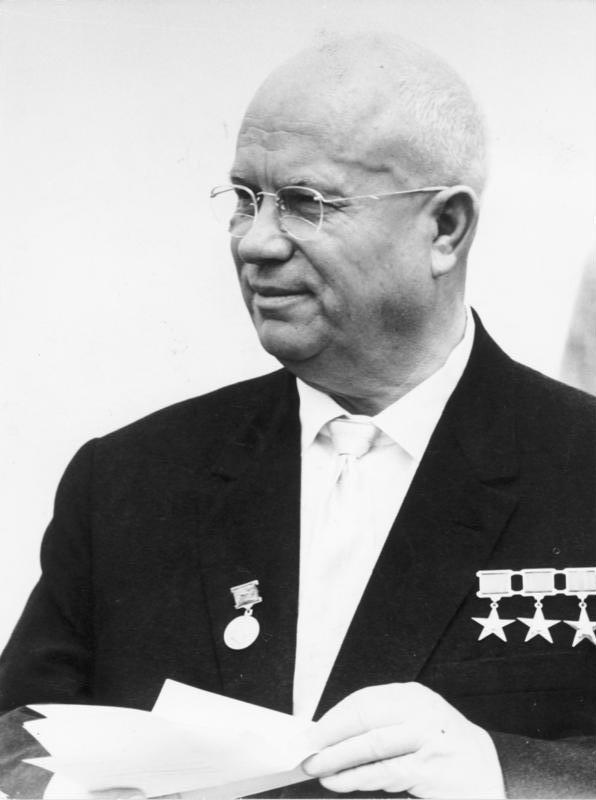
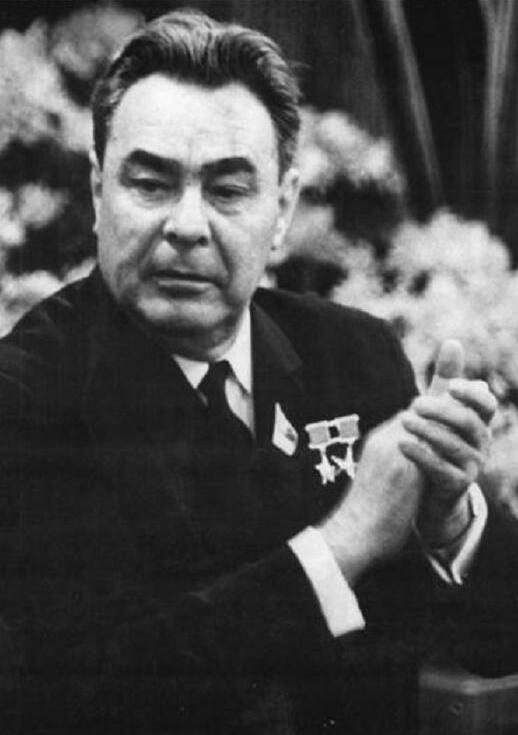
October 14, 1964: Soviet leader Nikita Khrushchev removed from office and replaced by Leonid Brezhnev
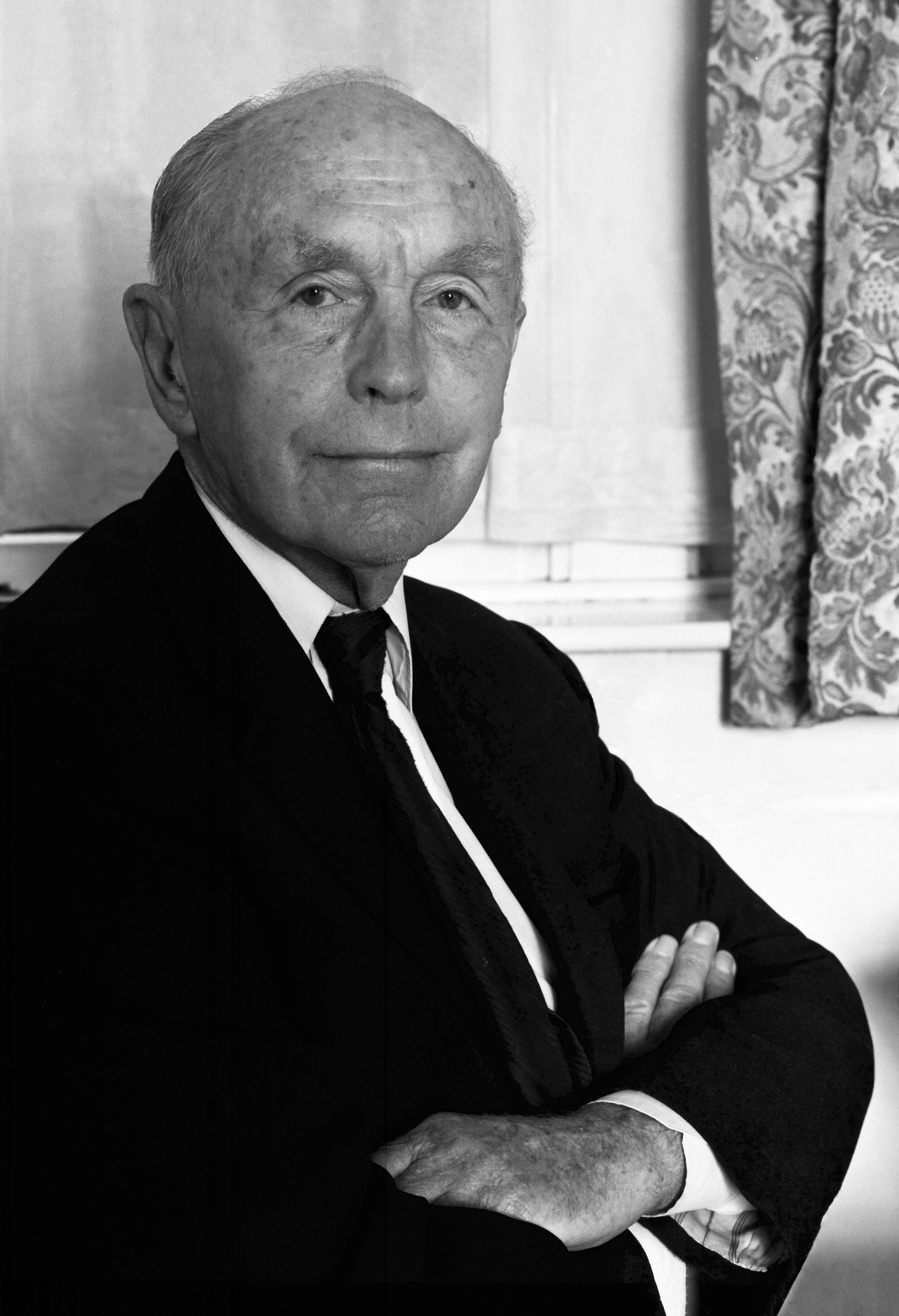
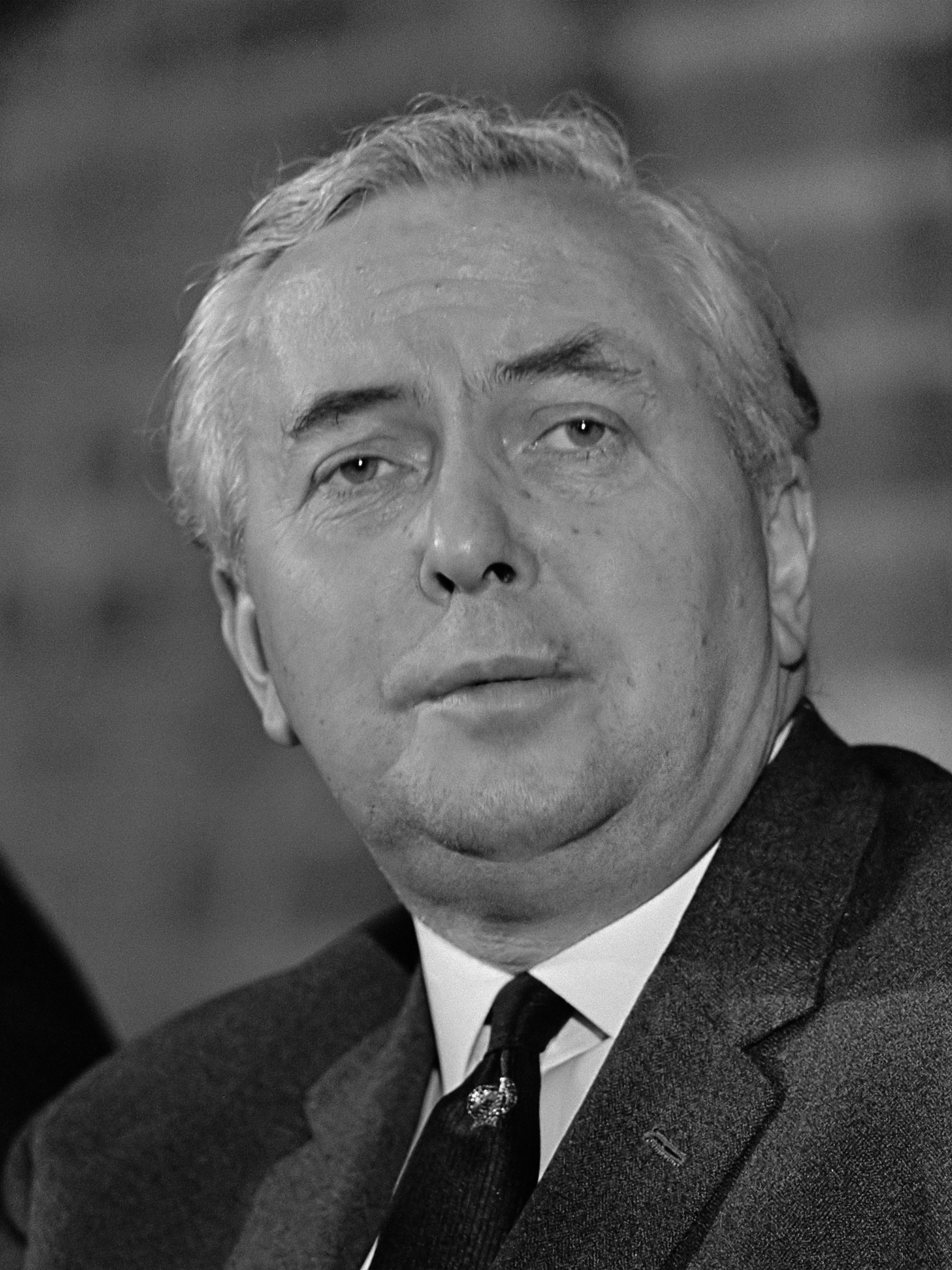
October 15, 1964: UK Prime Minister Douglas-Home's Conservatives lose to Harold Wilson's Labour Party

The following events occurred in October 1964:

== October 1, 1964 (Thursday) ==
- The wreckage of the American submarine USS Thresher was located, almost a year and a half after it sank during sea trials 220 miles (350 km) east of Cape Cod, killing all 129 people on board. U.S. Secretary of the Navy Paul H. Nitze disclosed later in the day that the bathyscape Trieste II had positively identified the lost vessel by its identifying number, 593, found on five different parts of the sub, which had broken up as it descended. The Thresher had sunk on April 10, 1963, with its entire crew and 17 civilians.
- At the University of California, Berkeley, police attempted to arrest Jack Weinberg, a Congress of Racial Equality volunteer who had violated a university ban on activism at the Sather Gate and who had refused to show his student identification. Hundreds of protesters then blocked the police car, and 21-year-old UC-Berkeley junior Mario Savio stood on the car's roof to address his fellow demonstrators, inaugurating the Free Speech Movement that would spread to other campuses.
- On the first day they could apply for passes to visit relatives in East Germany, 32,156 residents of West Berlin applied at the 17 different offices in the city that issued the permits. Each pass entitled the bearer to one visit between October 30 and November 12, and two visits during Christmas and New Year.
- The Shinkansen high-speed rail system was inaugurated in Japan, beginning a trip on the line's first section between Tokyo and Osaka. The initial speed for the 320-mile (510 km) trip was slower than expected, at 80 miles per hour (130 km/h).
- Born: Harry Hill, English comedian; as Matthew Keith Hall in Woking
- Died: Ernst Toch, 76, Austrian composer

== October 2, 1964 (Friday) ==
- All 80 people on board a Union de Transports Aériens flight were killed when the plane crashed into a mountain peak after taking off from Palma on the island of Majorca. The DC-6 had made several stops en route from Paris to Nouakchott in Mauritania, and departed from Palma at 4:14 a.m. and made its last contact with the Barcelona control tower at 5:10, giving no indication of trouble. Early accounts erroneously reported that the plane had fallen into the Mediterranean, roughly 45 miles (72 km) from Cartagena and the error would be repeated in reference books, including one account that "Although the crash area was searched by Spanish, French, British and Italian ships, neither survivors nor even wreckage of the doomed plane was ever discovered." The day after its disappearance, however, the missing French plane was located on the side of Mount Alcazaba, where it had impacted at 8,200 feet (2,500 m) on the 11,000 foot (3,400 m) mountain.
- A Communist Chinese musical, The East Is Red, was performed for the first time on a stage in Beijing and would gain widespread circulation the following year as a government-approved film about the Communist Revolution. People's Daily would report the next day that the musical, using "our people's favorite form of expression— singing and dancing— vividly portrayed the Chinese people, under the leadership of the Chinese Communists and Chairman Mao, engaged in their glorious journey of revolutionary battle and development."
- An American tourist in Paris was killed by a French woman who was committing suicide while both were visiting the Cathedral of Notre-Dame de Paris. Veronica McConnell, a 24-year-old hospital technician, was fatally injured when 37-year-old Denise Rey-Herne climbed over the balustrade of the 160-foot (49 m) high north tower and jumped, killing both of them.
- The collapse of a four-story apartment building in Cairo killed 45 people in Egypt. The dead were residents of the slums of the capital city's Deir el Malak district.
- The Kinks, created by English brothers Ray Davies and Dave Davies, released their first album. The self-titled album, Kinks, included their first hit song, "You Really Got Me".
- Died: James Cobb Burke, 49, American photographer who worked for Life magazine, was killed when he fell 800 feet (240 m) from a mountain in the Assam state in India, while taking pictures for as part of a reporting assignment.

== October 3, 1964 (Saturday) ==
- Operation Sea Orbit, the first round-the-world voyage by nuclear-powered ships, came to an end as the aircraft carrier USS Enterprise and the missile cruiser USS Long Beach arrived in Norfolk, Virginia after a 64-day, 32,600-mile (52,500 km) trip made without refueling; the cruise marked "the first around-the-world showing of the American flag" since the voyage of the Great White Fleet between 1907 and 1909.
- Algemene Bank Nederland (ABN, literally the General Bank of the Netherlands) was created by the merger of two Netherlands banks, Nederlandsche Handel-Maatschappij (NTS) and De Twentsche Bank (DTB). In the same year, Amsterdamsche Bank and Rotterdamsche Bank merged to create AMRO Bank. The two conglomerates would then merge in 1991 to become ABN AMRO.
- The New York Yankees clinched the American League pennant for the 29th time in 64 seasons, beating the Cleveland Indians, 8 to 3 and putting them two games ahead of the Chicago White Sox with only one game left in the season. At season's end the next day, the Yankees had a 99–63 win–loss record, the White Sox were 98-64 and the Baltimore Orioles were 97–65.
- The American TV series, Underdog, about an anthropomorphic shoeshine dog who turns into a superhero whenever trouble calls, is first broadcast on NBC. The show, which was created by Total Television, is one of the earliest known Saturday morning cartoons on U.S. television.
- A tornado killed 21 people when it swept through the predominantly Cajun French town of Larose, Louisiana, during storms hatched by the approach of Hurricane Hilda.
- Born: Clive Owen, English actor; in Coventry

== October 4, 1964 (Sunday) ==
- The St. Louis Cardinals clinched the National League pennant on the last day of the season with a combination of their 11 to 5 win over the New York Mets and the Cincinnati Reds' 10 to 0 loss to the Philadelphia Phillies. Going into the final day, St. Louis and Cincinnati both had records of 92 wins and 69 losses and both were playing at home; the Reds' loss came in the afternoon, and would have played a one-game playoff if the Cardinals had lost their evening game against the last place Mets.
- Graham Hill of England won the U.S. Grand Prix motor race for the second consecutive year, at Watkins Glen, New York, giving him the lead over fellow Englishman John Surtees and Scotland's Jim Clark with one race left in the 1964 Grand Prix series for the World Driving Championship. The tenth and last race would take place in Mexico City on October 25.
- Ahmad Shukeiri began the daily operation of the Palestine Liberation Organization (PLO), with offices at the Orient House in East Jerusalem, at that time a part of the Kingdom of Jordan. The creation of the PLO had been authorized by a June 2 resolution of the Palestinian National Congress.
- The 1964 Armstrong 500 motor race was held at the Mount Panorama Circuit in New South Wales, Australia, and was won by Spencer Martin and Bill Brown.
- Died: Earnest Elmo Calkins, 96, American ad executive who pioneered the use of artwork, the "soft sell", and fictional characters in advertising. E. E. Calkins, known as "The Dean of Advertising Men" and co-founder of the Calkins and Holden agency, became one of the industry's most successful people despite being profoundly deaf since childhood.

== October 5, 1964 (Monday) ==
- China's Communist Party Chairman Mao Zedong received a delegation of officials from North Vietnam, including its prime minister, Phạm Văn Đồng, and predicted that the U.S. effort could be defeated in the Vietnam War. Noting that the U.S. had 18 army divisions and that it could only spare three in Asia, Mao concluded that it was "impossible for the United States to send many troops to South Vietnam." Historian Michael Lind would write nearly 50 years later, "The significance of these conversations can hardly be exaggerated. We now know that the nightmare of American strategists had come true in the summer and fall of 1964."
- A narrow tunnel under the Berlin Wall was shut down, but not before 23 men and 31 women had escaped to West Berlin during the previous 48 hours. One border guard, East German Army Corporal Egon Schultz, was killed by gunfire, either by a stray bullet fired by his fellow guardsmen, or by someone on the western side. The tunnel began beneath a building on East Berlin's Streilitzer Strasse, running 35 feet beneath the wall and then another 450 feet "to the cellar of an abandoned bakery at 97 Bernauerstrasse in the Wedding district" in the French zone of East Berlin.
- The conference of Non-Aligned Nations began in Cairo, with representatives from 47 nations that considered themselves to be unaligned with either the United States or the Soviet Union. Congolese rebel Moise Tshombe arrived in Cairo, uninvited, after his charter jet was diverted to Athens and after he had returned to Cairo as the passenger on an Ethiopian Airlines, creating a diplomatic crisis.
- Trans-Canada Air Lines began a nationwide campaign with full-page newspaper advertisements headlined "TAKE A LOOK AT AIR CANADA", to announce a new name that would work equally well in English or French. The first airplane with the Air Canada logo would fly Queen Elizabeth back to the United Kingdom on October 13.
- Queen Elizabeth II of the United Kingdom and her consort The Duke of Edinburgh began an 8-day visit to Canada, starting with their landing at RCAF Station Summerside in Prince Edward Island on a chartered Boeing 707. The couple spent the night on board the royal yacht, HMY Britannia.
- The West African nation of Gambia issued its own, distinct national currency, the Gambian pound, in preparation for its independence on February 18, 1965; the new notes replaced the existing colonial currency, the British West African pound.

== October 6, 1964 (Tuesday) ==
- The Soviet Union launched Kosmos 47, an uncrewed test-flight of a prototype Soviet Voskhod spacecraft, a week before the actual Voskhod 1 crewed mission. According to one historian, the timetable for putting the three-man Voskhod capsule into space was hastened in order to move ahead of the two-man Gemini capsule being developed by the United States, and Soviet premier Nikita Khrushchev "placed so high a priority on space spectaculars that he felt it essential to fly a multimanned spacecraft before Gemini"; a three-man mission, by necessity, had to be very short because extra seats could only be accommodated by having less life support.
- The bishops of the Vatican Ecumenical Council approved measures for unity with non-Catholic Christians. Among items passed were a resolution of the Roman Catholic Church's need for "an examination of conscience" (2,120 to 46); an acknowledgment that the Church also had responsibility for the disunity with their "separated brethren" (2,076 to 92); to allow Catholics and other Christians to participate in common prayer in certain circumstances (1,872 to 292); and to take steps "to further Christian unity and inter-faith understanding" (2,099 to 62).
- Queen Elizabeth II began "her most guarded day in history" with unprecedented security measures as she visited Charlottetown, Prince Edward Island in Canada in the centennial celebration of the 1864 Charlottetown Conference. Because of fears of an attack on the British monarch, members of the Royal Canadian Mounted Police patrolled the streets and stood on the roofs of buildings, and four Royal Canadian Navy destroyers and a minesweeper escorted the royal yacht. The Queen addressed the crowd in both English and French.
- Walter Ulbricht, the Communist Party leader of East Germany, announced an amnesty for 10,000 political prisoners who were to be released before December 20. Ulbricht said that his government would "pardon those who by their conduct in prison had shown that they had learned their lesson".

== October 7, 1964 (Wednesday) ==
- See How They Run was broadcast on the NBC television network at 9:00 p.m. as the first "made-for-television movie", a feature-length motion picture designed to accommodate commercial breaks in its two hours. NBC ads in American newspapers announced it with the phrase "First Time on any Screen Anywhere!" and celebrated the "world premiere" of the suspense thriller, starring John Forsythe, Senta Berger, Franchot Tone, Jane Wyatt and Leslie Nielsen. Critics praised the "experiment" as a solution for the shortage of good quality motion pictures available for TV, though one noted, "You can call it a movie if you wish. A more accurate description, despite the sumptuous and expensive production, might be that it was really more or less a two-hour television show."
- Walter Jenkins, one of the most hard-working aides to U.S. President Johnson's staff, was arrested in the men's room of the YMCA in Washington, D.C., and charged with disorderly conduct after being caught engaged in homosexual intercourse. The FBI leaked the story to the Republican National Committee, although Johnson's opponent in the presidential election, Barry Goldwater, chose not to publicize it, and two Republican newspapers, the Chicago Tribune and the Cincinnati Enquirer, declined to publish the story. Jenkins would resign on October 14, after the Washington Star informed him that it would report the incident.
- The government of Southern Rhodesia announced that when Northern Rhodesia achieved independence as Zambia, the colony would officially refer to itself as Rhodesia.
- Born: Dan Savage, American author and LGBT activist; in Chicago
- Died: Eugen Varga, 84, Hungarian-born Soviet economic adviser

== October 8, 1964 (Thursday) ==
- The FBI foiled a plot by the United Klans of America to bomb the Evers Hotel in Philadelphia, Mississippi, where the remaining civil rights workers associated with the Council of Federated Organizations (COFO) had been staying. Agents went to the home of a Klansman and seized a cache of dynamite that he had stockpiled there, after having been tipped off by an informer.
- The Republic of China (Taiwan) entered the Vietnam War with the first contingent of 15 uniformed army officers, led by Lt. General Teng Ting-yuan.
- The Beatles recorded "She's a Woman" at the EMI Studios in Abbey Road. On the same day, drummer Ringo Starr passed his driving test.
- Born:
  - CeCe Winans, American gospel music singer; in Detroit, Michigan.
  - Jakob Arjouni, German crime fiction author who wrote under the pseudonym Jakob Bothe; in Frankfurt (died of pancreatic cancer, 2013)

== October 9, 1964 (Friday) ==
- At the Hôpital Necker in Paris, Dr. Jean Hamburger performed the first kidney transplantation from a deceased donor, after having pioneered kidney transplants in 1952. The donor was an anonymous 43-year-old person who had "died of a sudden cerebral catastrophe" and the recipient was a 19-year-old.
- From October 9 to 17, the first major tests of the NASA worldwide tracking network were conducted in preparation for crewed orbital flights in the Gemini program.
- Explorer 22 was launched into a "near perfect orbit" from Vandenberg Air Force Base in California as part of the first laser tests in outer space.
- Born: Guillermo del Toro, Mexican-born filmmaker, director, and author; in Guadalajara, Jalisco state

== October 10, 1964 (Saturday) ==
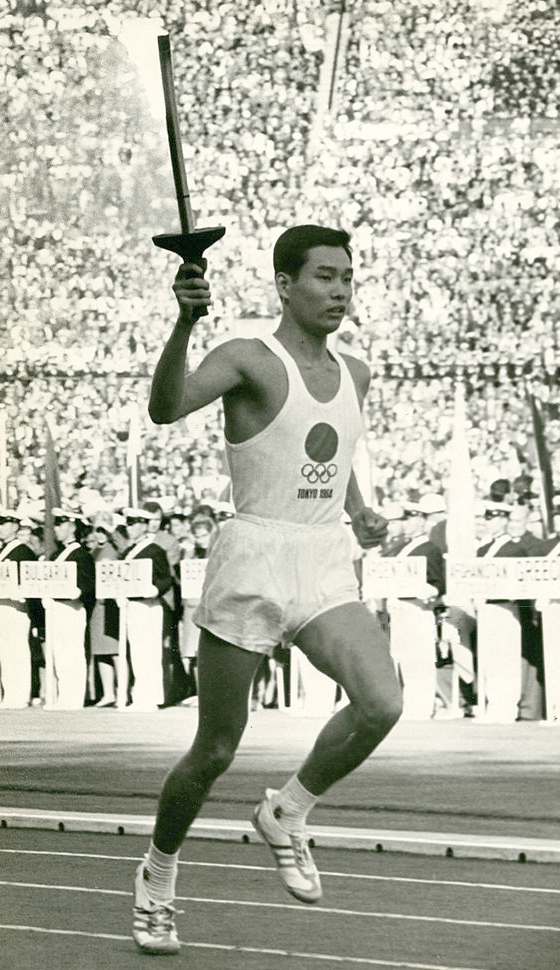
October 10, 1964: Yoshinori Sakai carries the Olympic torch into the National Stadium

- The 1964 Summer Olympics opened in Tokyo. Yoshinori Sakai, chosen to light the Olympic Flame, had been born near Hiroshima on August 6, 1945, the day an atomic bomb was dropped on that city. Japan's Emperor Hirohito then declared the games open. Starting at 2:00 in the afternoon local time, Olympic teams from 94 nations marched into the National Stadium. Live television coverage of the events could be seen in the United States with the aid of the recently launched Syncom 3 communications satellite, starting at 1:00 a.m. Eastern time on NBC.
- Born:
  - Maxi Gnauck, East German Olympic woman gymnast, 1980 Olympic gold medalist and winner of gold medals in three world championship events; in East Berlin
  - Quinton Flynn, American voice actor; in Cleveland
- Died: Eddie Cantor, 72, American comedian

== October 11, 1964 (Sunday) ==
- Five people were killed in an accident at the 1000 kilometres de Paris automobile race held at the Autodrome de Linas-Montlhéry in Montlhéry. Peter Lindner of West Germany was driving at full speed on the rain-swept course as Franco Patria of Italy was pulling onto the track following a pit stop. On the 85th lap, Lindner slammed on his brakes and his Jaguar skidded into Patria's Abarth Simca 2000, then continued through the air to where four of the French race officials were standing, striking three of them. Patria was killed instantly; Lindner and the three flag marshals — Jean Peyrard, Roger Millot and M. Desmoulins — died of their injuries after being taken to a hospital.

== October 12, 1964 (Monday) ==
- Nikita Khrushchev, the First Secretary of the Soviet Communist Party and the Soviet Union's prime minister, was on vacation at the Black Sea resort of Pitsunda in the Georgian SSR, and would recall later that he realized he had a problem when he did not receive a telephone call to inform him about the details of the Voskhod launch. He called the deputy premier, Leonid Smirnov, to demand to know why he had not been kept fully informed. Khrushchev was able to make his customary phone call to cosmonauts on a new mission and was heard on national television to joke, "I warn you, you managed quite well with the gravity overloads during takeoff, but be ready for the overloads which we will arrange for you after you come back to Earth. Then we'll meet you in Moscow with all the honors you deserve." It would be the last time that Soviet citizens heard him on television.
- The Soviet Union launched Voskhod 1 into Earth orbit with three cosmonauts at 1:30 p.m. local time (0730 UTC), marking the first time a spacecraft was launched with more than one crew member. After determining that the capsule was adequately pressurized, Vladimir Komarov, Konstantin Feoktistov and Boris Yegorov requested permission to continue the mission without their space suits, and became the first humans to go into space without special gear. The flight was cut short and landed the next day after 16 orbits. Feoktistov was the first engineer to travel into space. Voskhod 1 was the first crewed spacecraft to use an ion thruster rather than a conventional rocket engine.
- In the evening, Leonid Brezhnev, the Second Secretary of the Soviet Communist Party, called Khrushchev and told him that he was needed at a meeting of the Party's Central Committee "to discuss agriculture and 'some other matters'".
- The 16th Audio Engineering Society Convention, where Dr. Robert Moog demonstrated his prototype Moog synthesizer, opened in New York City.

== October 13, 1964 (Tuesday) ==
- Summoned by the Communist Party's Central Committee, First Secretary Nikita Khrushchev cut short his vacation. Before departing from Pitsunda to Moscow, he met, as scheduled, France's energy minister, Gaston Palewski, in what would be his last conduct of foreign affairs, then boarded a plane and flew to Moscow. He was infuriated when nobody met him at the airport on his arrival, and went to the Kremlin to confront the Presidium, which was discussing his removal from office. According to one source, he ordered his defense minister, Marshal Rodion Malinovsky, to arrest Second Secretary Mikhail Suslov and any other conspirators; Malinovsky replied that he would only respond to the party's Central Committee, and KGB Chairman Vladimir Semichastny gave the same reply. Khrushchev was advised that he was to appear before the entire 170-member Committee for a hearing on his removal from office.
- Iran's parliament, the Majlis, narrowly approved the "Bill of Capitulation" (Layihiyi Capitulasion) introduced by the government of Prime Minister Hassan Ali Mansur, giving diplomatic immunity to American military servicemen stationed there, voting 74 to 61 in favor of it. The reaction by the Ayatollah Ruhollah Khomeini 13 days later would lead to Khomeini's expulsion from the country for the next 14 years.
- Queen Elizabeth II of the United Kingdom concluded her official tour of Canada, departing from Ottawa to London on the first flight of an airplane carrying the name and logos of Air Canada.
- Voskhod 1 landed at 0747 UTC (2:47 p.m. local time) in the Kazakh SSR, northeast of Kustanai, after making 16 orbits of the Earth.

== October 14, 1964 (Wednesday) ==
- The Central Committee of the Communist Party of the Soviet Union voted to retire Nikita Khrushchev from his position as the Party's General Secretary, and the Presidium of the Supreme Soviet voted to accept his "voluntary" retirement as Chairman of the Council of Ministers, thus removing him from his position as the leader of the Soviet Union. In a continuation of the Central Committee meeting that started the day before, one speaker after another outlined Khrushchev's mistakes, with Mikhail Suslov, Dmitry Polyansky, Alexander Shelepin, Leonid Brezhnev and Petr Shelest denouncing him. Among the offenses charged against Khrushchev were that he had tried to develop a cult of personality; that he had presided over the nation's economic decline; that he had brought the Soviet Union to the brink of war in the Suez, in Berlin and in Cuba; and that he had insulted his colleagues and the nation's foreign allies. The Committee unanimously approved a resolution that "Recognizing that as a result of mistakes and incorrect actions by Comrade Khrushchev, violating Leninist principles of collective leadership... there has been created a completely abnormal situation, preventing members of the Central Committee Presidium from fulfilling responsible tasks in leading the party and the country", and went on to admonish him for "concentrating in his hands great power" (as both party leader and government leader) and failing to consider the views of the senior party leaders, as well as "revealing intolerance and rudeness towards comrades in the Presidium and the Central Committee, treating their views with disdain". Khrushchev resigned his positions, and the Party voted to grant him benefits for the rest of his life, including a security staff, his GAZ-13 Chaika limousine and chauffeur, an apartment in Moscow and a dacha to stay at in the countryside, as well as a pension of 500 rubles per month. Resolving to keep the roles of party and governmental leadership separate, the Central Committee then installed Leonid Brezhnev as the new Communist Party leader and Alexei Kosygin became the new Premier. The news of Khrushchev's surprise ouster was not revealed to Soviet citizens or to the rest of the world until October 16, with a statement in Pravda that said, "A plenum of the Central Committee of the CPSU took place on 14 October of this year. The plenum of the CC CPSU granted the request of Comrade N. S. Khrushchev to be released from his duties as First Secretary of the CC CPSU, member of the Presidium of the CC CPSU and Chairman of the USSR Council of Ministers, in connection with his advanced age and the deterioration of his health. The plenum of the CC CPSU elected L. I. Brezhnev as First Secretary of the CC CPSU."
- A Boeing B-50D-80-BO Superfortress, 48-065, converted to KB-50J, of the 421st Air Refueling Squadron, Takhli RTAFB, crashed in Thailand shortly after takeoff on a training mission while supporting Yankee missions over Laos. Corrosion found in the wreckage would lead to early retirement of the KB-50 fleet and its replacement with Boeing KC-135s.
- Hurricane Isbell threatened the Cape Kennedy area and appeared to be continuing into the next day, but its path was far enough south to make temporary taking down of Gemini launch vehicle 2 2 unnecessary, though testing was curtailed.
- Italian soccer football legend Giorgio Chinaglia played his first professional game, appearing at the age of 17 for Swansea Town in a 2–2 tie with Rotherham United in the English League's Third Division.
- Dr. Martin Luther King Jr. became the youngest recipient of the Nobel Peace Prize, awarded to him for leading non-violent resistance to end racial prejudice in the United States.
- The Sikorsky CH-53 Sea Stallion helicopter made its first flight, at the Sikorsky plant in Stratford, Connecticut, several months behind schedule.
- Born: Joe Girardi, American baseball player and manager, voted National League Manager of the Year in 2006 after being fired by the Florida Marlins and also led the New York Yankees to the 2009 World Series championship; in Peoria, Illinois

== October 15, 1964 (Thursday) ==
- Elections were held for the 630 seats of the United Kingdom's House of Commons, and brought an end to 13 years of rule by the Conservative Party, led by Prime Minister Alec Douglas-Home. Prior to the dissolution of Parliament, the Conservatives had 365 seats and Harold Wilson's Labour Party had 258. Sixty-six Conservative MPs were voted out of office, and the party gained only five for a net loss of 61 seats. Labour replaced 65 of the 66. After the votes were counted, Labour had only two more than the 315 seats needed for a majority, with a slim lead of 317 to Conservative's 304 and Liberal's nine.
- The St. Louis Cardinals defeated the visiting New York Yankees, 7 to 5, to win the World Series in seven games, ending the Yankees' long run of successes.
- Craig Breedlove's jet-powered car Spirit of America set a new world record for fastest speed on land, as he became the first person to drive an automobile at more than 500 miles per hour (800 km/h). Racing on the Bonneville Salt Flats in Utah, he averaged 526.26 miles per hour (846.93 km/h). The previous mark of 468.72 miles per hour (754.33 km/h) had been set only two days earlier. On his way back down the 10-mile (16 km) Bonneville track, however, Breedlove deployed the parachute that was supposed to stop his car after it completed one mile, and, in his words, "It ripped to shreds, I was going so fast." He coasted for two more miles and tried the second parachute, and it ripped as well. He then pushed on the disc brakes and left skid marks of 6 miles (9.7 km) long until they burned out, and was still at 350 miles per hour (560 km/h) as he reached the end of the track; he continued three more miles, striking two telephone poles, skidded sideways into a dike, went airborne for 30 feet (9.1 m) and landed in 18-foot (5.5 m) deep waters— and walked away, uninjured.
- At the Summer Olympics, Yelena Gorchakova of the Soviet Union shattered the women's world record for the javelin throw with a mark of 62.40 meters (204 feet, 8½ inches), beating the old record of 59.78m (196' 1½").
- Born: Luis Fernando López, Bolivian businessman, retired military officer, and politician who served as minister of defense from 2019 to 2020; in La Paz
- Died:
  - Cole Porter, 73, American composer and songwriter known for the music and lyrics for multiple popular songs for films and numerous Broadway musicals (including Anything Goes and the Tony Award winning Kiss Me, Kate, including the songs "Night and Day", "Begin the Beguine", "I Get a Kick Out of You", "I've Got You Under My Skin" and "Let's Do It, Let's Fall in Love"
  - Nguyen Van Troi, 24, Vietnamese assassin, was executed by a firing squad after being convicted of a plot to assassinate U.S. Defense Secretary Robert McNamara and Ambassador Henry Cabot Lodge Jr. while they had been visiting South Vietnam in May.

== October 16, 1964 (Friday) ==
- The People's Republic of China became the fifth nation in the world (after the United States, the Soviet Union, the United Kingdom and France) to acquire nuclear weapons, after successfully exploding an atomic bomb at the Lop Nor test site in a desert in the Xinjiang region. The 25-kiloton bomb, code named "596", was detonated at 3:00 in the afternoon China Standard Time (0700 UTC).
- Harold Wilson was asked by Queen Elizabeth II to form a new government as Prime Minister of the United Kingdom, following the triumph of his Labour Party. Immediate appointments to the First Wilson ministry included Gerald Gardiner, Baron Gardiner as Lord Chancellor, James Callaghan as Chancellor of the Exchequer, and Patrick Gordon Walker as Foreign Secretary. He would continue as Prime Minister until June 20, 1970, then serve again from 1974 to 1976.
- Baron Gardiner, was appointed by Prime Minister Wilson to be the new Lord High Chancellor of Great Britain, who functioned as the presiding officer of the House of Lords and the highest ranking judiciary officer for England and Wales, as well as a member of the Queen's Privy Council and of the Prime Minister's Cabinet.

== October 17, 1964 (Saturday) ==
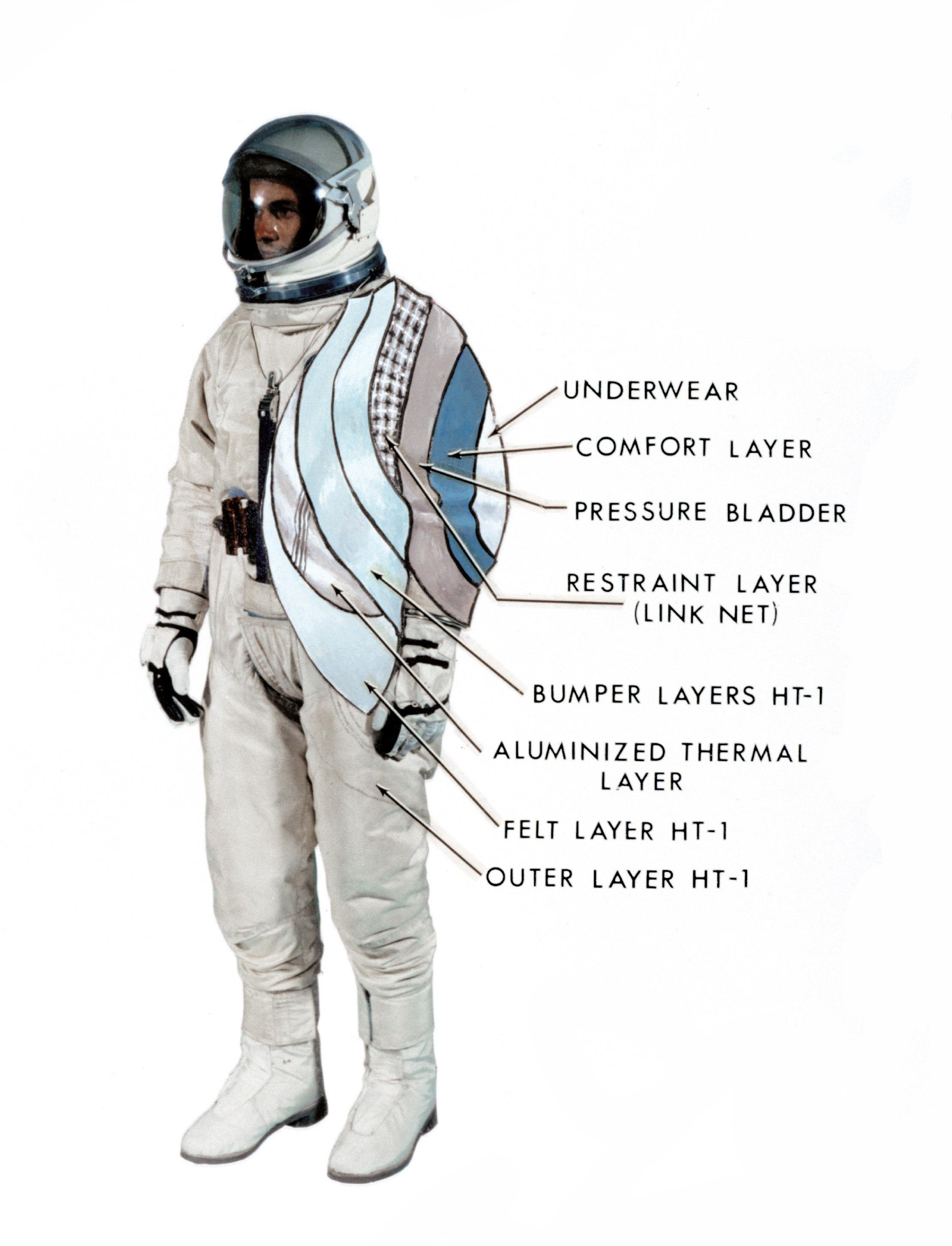
Gemini extravehicular space suit

- NASA's Crew Systems Division reported that the first Gemini extravehicular prototype suit had been received from the contractor and assigned to Astronaut James A. McDivitt for evaluation in the Gemini mission simulator. During the test, McDivitt complained of some bulkiness and immobility while the suit was in the unpressurized condition, but the bulk did not appear to hinder mobility when the suit was pressurized. The thermal/micrometeoroid cover layer had been installed on a test suit sent to Ling-Temco-Vought for thermal testing in the space simulator chamber.

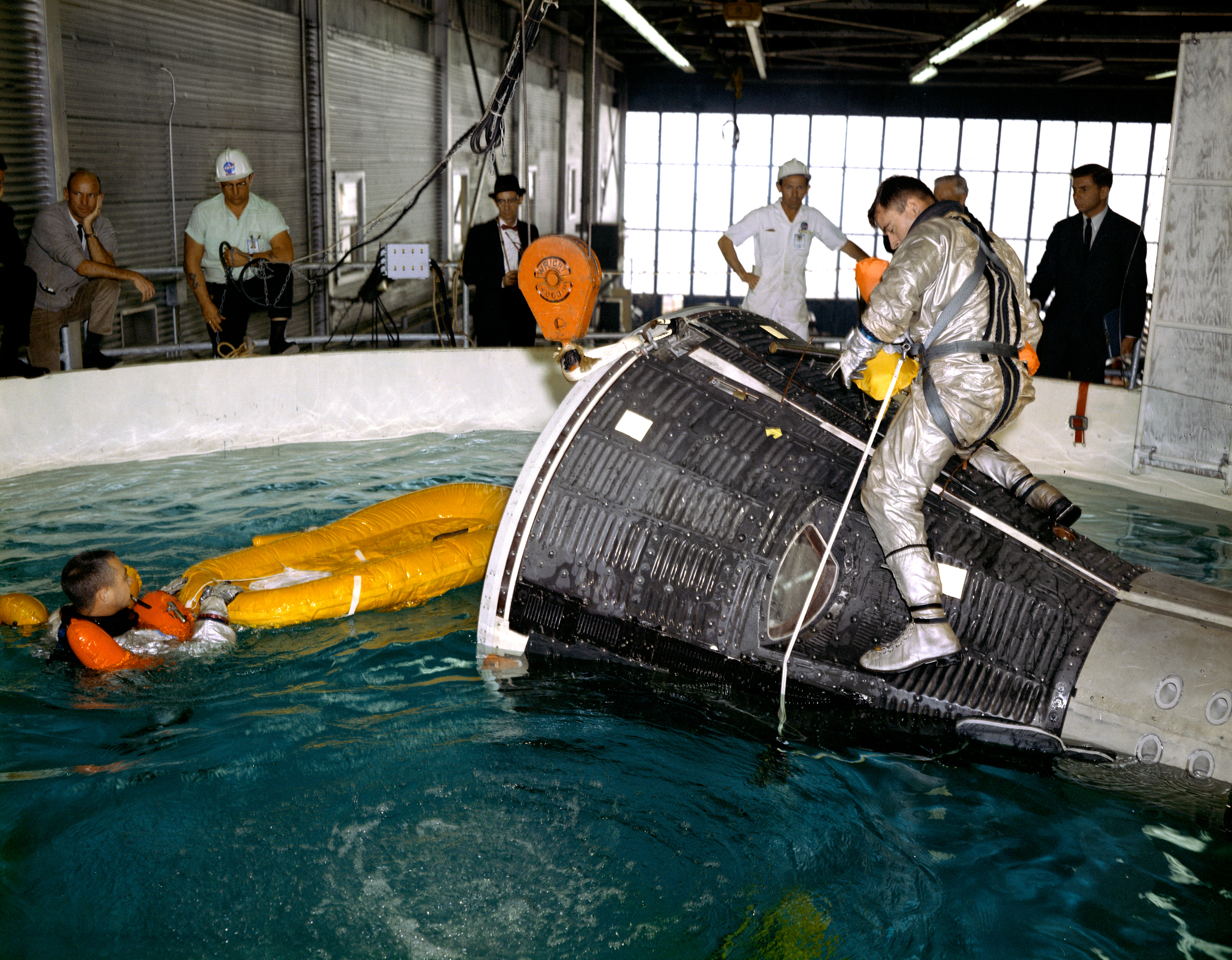
Gemini 3 prime crew water egress training

- Flight Crew Support Division reported that the Gemini-Titan (GT) 3 primary crew had completed egress practice in boilerplate No. 201 in the Ellington Air Force Base flotation tank. The backup GT-4 crew was scheduled for such training on October 23. Full-scale egress and recovery training for both the GT-3 and the GT-4 crews was scheduled to begin about January 15, when parachute refresher courses would also be scheduled.

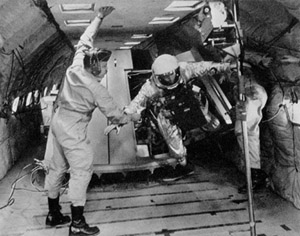
McDonnell engineer Norman Shyken in zero-g test

- Crew Systems Division reported that zero-g tests had been conducted at Wright-Patterson Air Force Base to evaluate extravehicular life support system ingress techniques. Results showed that, after practice at zero-g, subjects wearing the chest pack had successfully entered the spacecraft and secured the hatch in approximately 50 seconds.
- Prime Minister Wilson created the government post of Secretary of State for Wales and appointed veteran Welsh Labour MP Jim Griffiths to the new position.

== October 18, 1964 (Sunday) ==
- Barbara Castle was appointed as the British Minister for Overseas Development by Prime Minister Harold Wilson, becoming the first female cabinet minister in the United Kingdom since Florence Horsbrugh's service in the early 1950s as the British Minister of Education for England and Wales in Prime Minister Winston Churchill's cabinet.
- The New York World's Fair closed for the year after a six-month run, and paid attendance of 33,373,446 people, with 200,076 passing through the turnstiles on the final day. It would reopen for a second six-month run on April 21, 1965.
- Charles Lwanga, and the 21 Uganda Martyrs who were killed for converting to Roman Catholicism in the 19th century, were made saints of the Roman Catholic Church in a canonization by Pope Paul VI.
- Kevin Berry broke his own world record in the men's 200m butterfly (long course) on the last day of the swimming competition at the Summer Olympics in Tokyo, Japan, with a time of 2:06.6.
- The new University of South Alabama was dedicated at Mobile, Alabama.

== October 19, 1964 (Monday) ==
- The nearly intact bones of a woolly mammoth (Mammuthus primigenius) were discovered near the town of Kyle, Saskatchewan, where William MacEvoy was working with a construction crew on the building of a new road. When the scraper blade on an earthmover exposed large bones, MacEvoy recognized its significance and work halted until the rest of the skeleton could be found. Radiocarbon dating determined that the mammoth had died sometime between 10200 and 9800 BC.
- NASA and the National Academy of Sciences announced the taking of applications for NASA Astronaut Group 4, the first to be chosen from scientists rather than pilots. According to the announcement, a candidate had to be a U.S. citizen, no taller than six feet (183 cm), born on or after August 1, 1930, and to have an M.D. or a Ph.D. in natural sciences or engineering. Three physicists, two physicians and a geologist would ultimately be chosen as the six candidates.
- The Novorossiysk Sheskharis Oil Terminal, one of the largest such terminals in Russia, provided its first shipment of crude oil, with the delivery of 37,000 tons of petroleum to the tanker Likhoslavl at the harbor on the Black Sea.
- Born:
  - Agnès Jaoui, French actress, director and screenwriter; in Antony, Hauts-de-Seine
  - Ty Pennington, American television host; as Gary Tygert Burton in Atlanta
- Died:
  - Marshal Sergey Biryuzov, 59, Chief of Staff of the Armed Forces of the Soviet Union and the nation's highest-ranking military officer, was killed along with six other Red Army generals and the airplane's 11-member crew, when their Ilyushin-18 turboprop crashed into the side of Mount Avala in Yugoslavia's Serbian Republic. The officers were on their way to a celebration of the 20th anniversary of Yugoslavia's liberation from Germany in 1944.
  - Russ Brown, 72, American stage actor who won a Tony Award for the musical Damn Yankees

== October 20, 1964 (Tuesday) ==
- The new Soviet government announced, by way of the official newspaper Izvestia, its approval of an experimental profit-based economic system that had been recommended by economist Yevsei Liberman of Kharkov State University. On September 20, Liberman had noted in the Communist Party newspaper Pravda that two textile factories had increased productivity by allowing factory managers to depart from government-mandated production quotas and had relied instead on direct communication from retail stores and distributors concerning consumer need.
- Aircraft flown from South Vietnam flew into neighboring Cambodia and bombed the village of Anlong Chrey, killing seven civilians. Cambodia protested to the United Nations, then shot down a U.S. transport plane four days later.

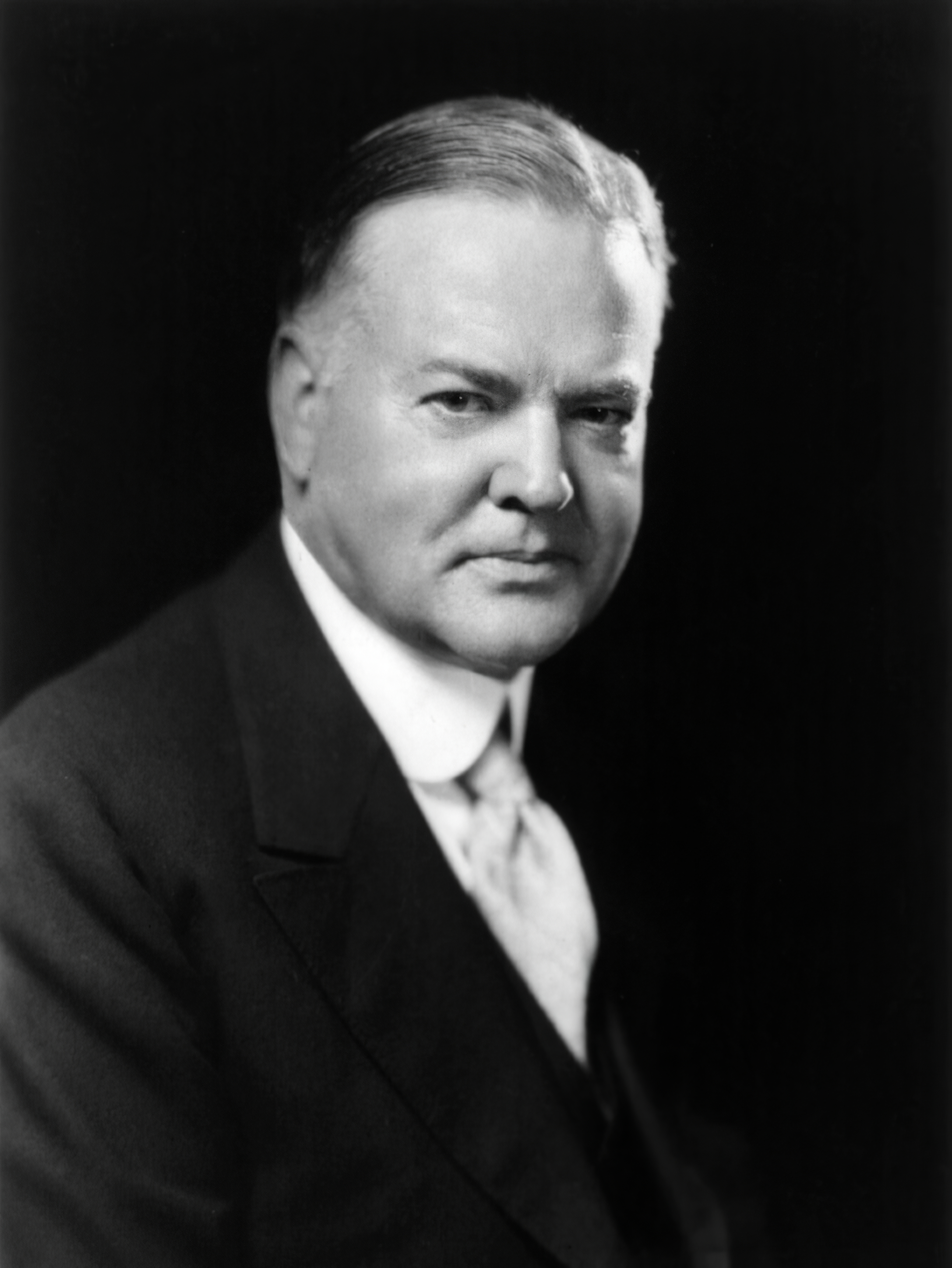
U.S. President Hoover, died October 20, 1964

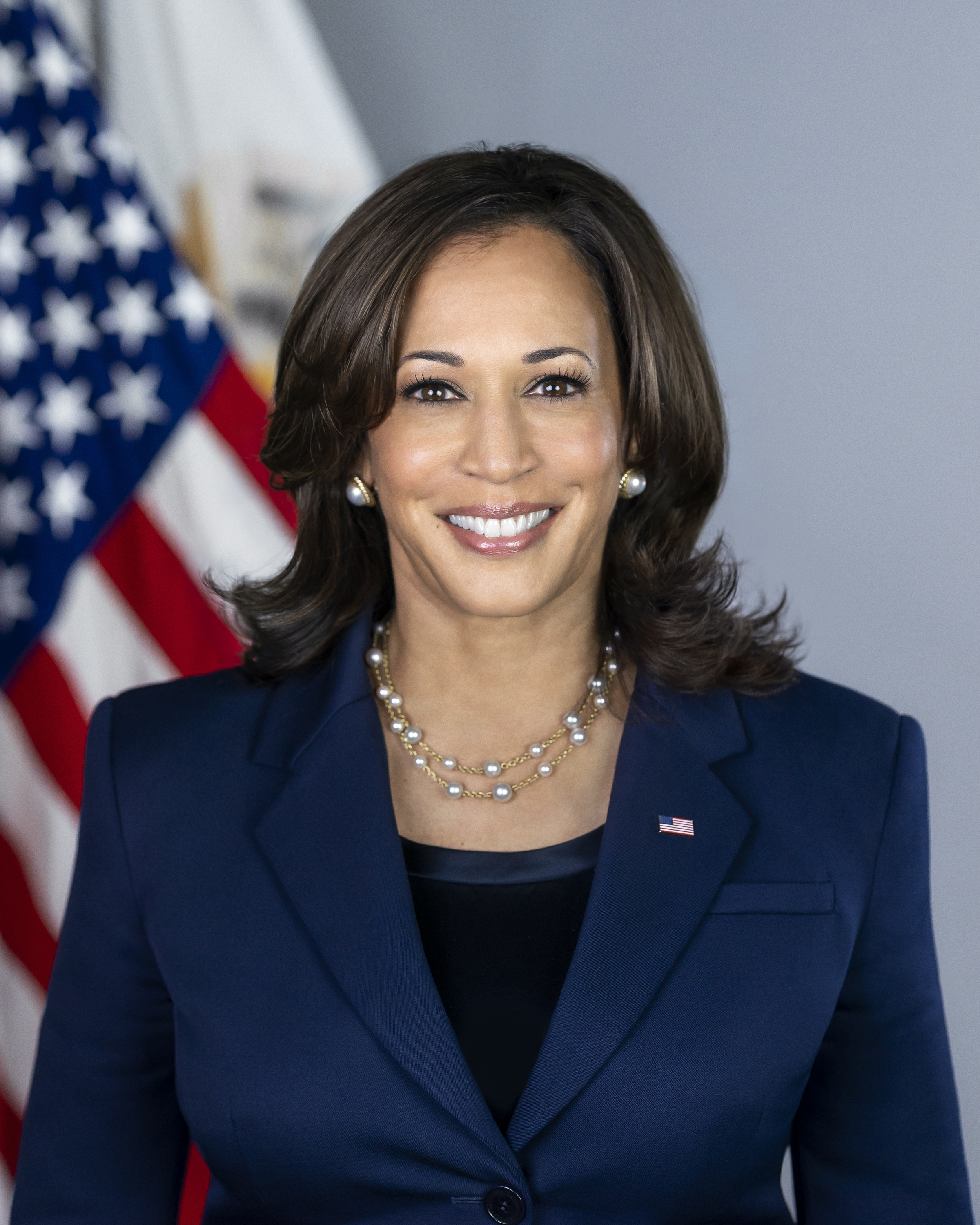
U.S. Vice President Harris, born October 20, 1964

- Born: Kamala Harris, Vice President of the United States from 2021 to 2025, Democratic Party nominee for president for the 2024 U.S. presidential election, U.S. Senator from California from 2017 to 2021; in Oakland, California
- Died: Herbert Hoover, 90, 31st president President of the United States. Hoover, who had served from 1929 to 1933, and died at 11:35 a.m. in the Waldorf Towers in Manhattan, where he had retired after leaving the White House. U.S. President Johnson ordered flags to be flown at half-staff for 30 days. At the time, Hoover was the second longest-lived former U.S. president, behind John Adams, whose record would be broken by Ronald Reagan in 2001, who was 93 years, 120 days old when he died in 2004; three presidents would later exceed Reagan's record, with 100-year-old Jimmy Carter holding it as of 2024.

== October 21, 1964 (Wednesday) ==
- The film version of the hit Broadway stage musical My Fair Lady had its world premiere, projected at the Criterion Theater in New York City on Broadway. It would then be released in other major cities during the autumn before being distributed nationwide. Rex Harrison reprised his stage performance as Professor Henry Higgins, a role which would win him the Academy Award for Best Actor. Harrison's Broadway co-star, Julie Andrews, had been passed over in favor of Audrey Hepburn for the role of Eliza Doolittle. My Fair Lady would win eight Academy Awards in all, including Best Picture, but Hepburn would not even be nominated; the award for Best Actress would go, instead, to Andrews for her performance in Mary Poppins.
- Gheorghe Gheorghiu-Dej, the president and Communist Party chief of Romania, broke relations with the Soviet Union's new leadership, and told the Soviet Ambassador in Bucharest to withdraw all KGB spies and officials from the country. The move would trigger an angry reaction from the Soviets, who ultimately agreed to pull their agents out of Romania in December, marking the first time that a Warsaw Pact member got rid of the USSR's intelligence agency.
- The asteroid 1930 Lucifer, roughly 21 miles (34 km) in diameter, was discovered by astronomer Elizabeth Roemer from the observatory in Flagstaff, Arizona. Roemer was given the honor of naming the asteroid, and gave it the name "Lucifer", Latin for "light-giver", but also associated in literature with the fallen angel who became the Devil, most notably by Dante Alighieri in his 13th century epic The Inferno, and by John Milton in his 17th century epic Paradise Lost. Lucifer was mentioned in the King James Version of the Bible in Isaiah 14:12, though subsequent translations of the original Hebrew refer to the "morning star".
- Students at the University of Khartoum in the Sudan began protests against the nation's government after being inspired by the Muslim Brotherhood, leading to the downfall of President Ibrahim Abboud.
- Ethiopian athlete Abebe Bikila won the Olympic Marathon, only 40 days after he had undergone surgery for an appendectomy. Bikila was the first person to win the event twice.
- Died: Margaret Gibson, 70, American silent film leading lady

== October 22, 1964 (Thursday) ==
- A 5.3 kiloton nuclear device was detonated in Mississippi in the underground Tatum Salt Dome, 2,700 feet (820 m) below Lamar County near Baxterville. The shock wave from the blast "lifted the ground 4 inches in a ripple that rolled across the countryside for miles"; prior to the blast, a U.S. Atomic Energy Commission employee placed a humorous sign near the instruments over the blast site, with the words "The South shall rise again". The test was the "Salmon" phase of the U.S. Atomic Energy Commission's Project Dribble, part of the Vela Uniform program.
- The city of Camarillo, California, named for popular town citizens Adolfo Camarillo and Juan Camarillo Jr., who had laid out the town in 1910, was incorporated. Councilman Earl Joseph was selected as the city's first mayor. With a population of less than 2,400 at the time of incorporation, Camarillo would increase to more than 19,000 within six years and had a population of 70,741 in 2020.
- Chitty-Chitty-Bang-Bang: The Magical Car, a book written by British author Ian Fleming, was published posthumously by Jonathan Cape in London. Ian, known for his James Bond novels, died two months prior to the books release. The book would be made into a 1968 film of the same name, getting positive reviews on its first showing.
- The Nobel Prize for Literature was awarded to French philosopher Jean-Paul Sartre, despite the fact he had declined it in advance.
- Born:
  - Amit Shah, Indian politician, Minister of Home Affairs (since 2019) and leader of that nation's second largest political organization, the Bharatiya Janata Party from 2014 to 2020; in Bombay (now Mumbai)
  - Paul McStay, Scottish soccer football player who appeared for 17 seasons and 515 games for Celtic between 1981 and 1997; in Hamilton, South Lanarkshire
  - Dražen Petrović, Croatian Yugoslavian NBA player and Basketball Hall of Fame member; in Šibenik, Croatian SR, Yugoslavia (killed in auto accident, 1993)
  - TobyMac (stage name for Kevin Michael McKeehan), American Christian rapper; in Fairfax, Virginia
- Died: Whip Wilson (Roland Charles Meyers), 53, American western film star in the 1940s and 1950s; of a heart attack

== October 23, 1964 (Friday) ==
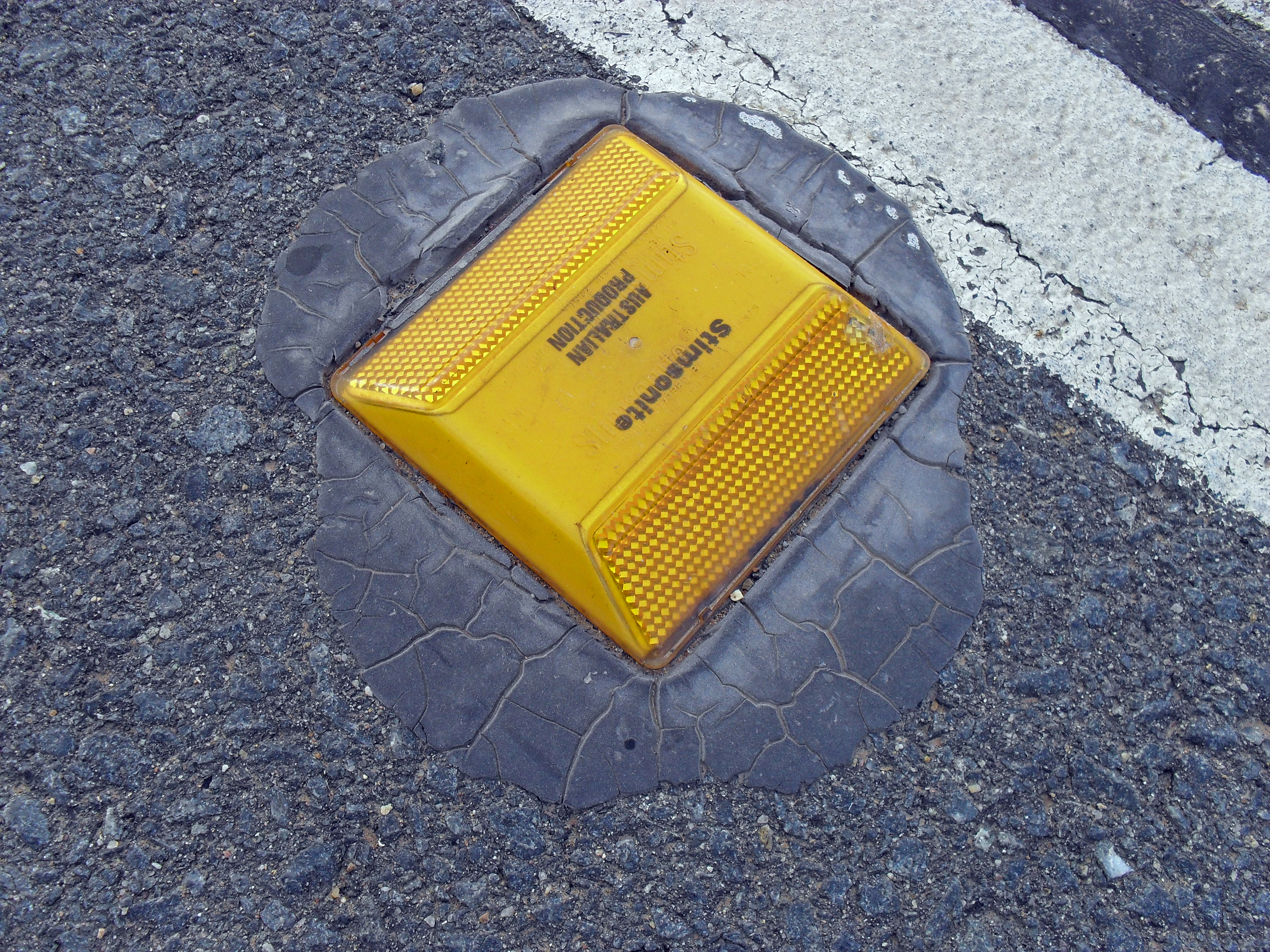
The marker used worldwide

- Inventor Sidney A. Heenan of Park Ridge, Illinois, applied for the patent for the reflective raised pavement marker that marks traffic lanes in much of the world, describing his invention as "a marking visible from an oncoming vehicle on a generally horizontal roadway surface" by means of a "reverse light receiving and reflecting face provided with a plurality of retrodirective reflector elements of the cube corner type for receiving light emanating from the oncoming vehicle and incident upon the obverse face in a generally horizontal direction of incidence and reflecting such light to return the incident light generally parallel to the direction of incidence." U.S. Patent Number 3,332,327 would be granted on July 25, 1967.
- The first land was purchased for the site of the future Walt Disney World in rural Orange County, Florida, near the Interstate 4 highway (I-4), using a holding company called the "Ayefour Corporation" in order to prevent speculators from finding out that Walt Disney was buying up property. The first sale was for $22,000 by Thurston Squires to Ayefour for five acres of land. Over the next 12 months, Disney would acquire 21,000 acres in Orange County and about 9,000 adjacent acres in Osceola County.
- Eight weeks after J. Frank Wilson and the Cavaliers had released their hit ballad, "Last Kiss", about a boy whose date was killed in a car accident, several of the band members were injured and their manager was killed when their car collided head-on with a tractor-trailer near Kenton, Ohio. Sonley Roush was driving Wilson and his band to Lima, Ohio, for an appearance.
- World Championship Wrestling, the first large scale professional wrestling circuit in Australia, made its arena debut at the Sydney Stadium.
- Born: Robert Trujillo, American musician who has been the bassist for heavy metal band Metallica since 2003; in Santa Monica, California
- Died: David Box, 21, American musician who took over as lead singer for The Crickets after Buddy Holly was killed in a 1959 plane crash. Box himself died in a plane crash along with three other people.

== October 24, 1964 (Saturday) ==
Northern Rhodesia

Zambia

- The Republic of Zambia became independent at 12:01 a.m. local time (2201 UTC October 23) after having been the British protectorate of Northern Rhodesia, ending 73 years of British rule. At 11:56 p.m., the Union Jack had been lowered at Independence Stadium in Lusaka by the last Governor, Sir Evelyn Hone, who was accompanied by Commonwealth Secretary Arthur Bottomley, and by Victoria Alexandra, Princess Royal, who was appearing on behalf of her niece, Queen Elizabeth II. Kenneth Kaunda, who had been Prime Minister of Northern Rhodesia for ten months after the breakup of the Federation of Rhodesia and Nyasaland, was inaugurated as the first president of Zambia.
- Cambodia shot down an American C-123 cargo plane that was part of a convoy of three U.S. Air Force transports flying over the Cambodian border village of Dak Dam in the Mondulkiri Province. All eight crew members on board were killed. The action came four days after the neutral nation's leader, Prince Norodom Sihanouk, had protested to the United Nations about the bombing of a Cambodian village by a South Vietnamese airplane.
- The 1964 Summer Olympics came to an end in Tokyo.

== October 25, 1964 (Sunday) ==
- The World Driving Championship, awarded to the best overall driver of Formula One race cars in the season's series of Grand Prix motor racing events, came down to the 10th and final event of the 1964 Formula One season, the Mexican Grand Prix. After nine races, Graham Hill had 39 points, John Surtees 34, and Jim Clark 30 under a "9–6–4–3–2–1" scoring system that gave points to the six highest finishers in a race (nine points for first place, six points for second, down to one point for sixth place). Hill needed only to be one of the six top finishers; Surtees had to finish first or second; Clark (who won the pole position in qualifying) had the potential to tie for the series championship if he won in Mexico and neither Hill nor Surtees finished in the top six. Hill completed 44 of the 65 laps in the 300 kilometres (190 miles) race before developing engine trouble, and got no extra points; Clark led most of the way until 10 laps from the end when he had an oil leak, and would say later, "I did what I could but half a lap from the end the motor just ceased and that was the end." Dan Gurney crossed the finish line first in Mexico, and in the final minute, the race for second ended up as a duel between Surtees and Lorenzo Bandini; Surtees crossed the finish line at 2:10.59.26, just 0.69 seconds ahead of Bandini. On the strength of the six points for second place, Surtees finished the season with 40 points, Hill with 39, to win the 1964 championship by a single point.
- In one of the more notable mistakes in National Football League history, Jim Marshall of the Minnesota Vikings scooped up a fumble made by the San Francisco 49ers, was twisted around in the process, and ran 66 yards with it to the end zone "for what he thought was a touchdown"; Marshall had actually run towards his own end zone and threw the ball out of bounds in a celebration that resulted in a safety and two points for his opponents. Late in the fourth quarter, the Vikings had been ahead of the 49ers, 27–17, and the mistake cut the lead to 27–19. Marshall and his teammates were able to keep the 49ers from the end zone for the rest of the game, and limited them to one more field goal in a 27–22 win. Roy Riegels, whose wrong-way run in the 1929 Rose Bowl helped the University of California to lose the game, joked the next day, "I think I'll drop him a line saying, 'Welcome to the club.' Take it from me, he'll get a lot of kidding for the rest of his life, so he'll just have to learn to take it and laugh with the crowd."
- The Rolling Stones made their first appearance on The Ed Sullivan Show. While the studio audience was enthusiastic, television viewers had a different reaction. Unlike The Beatles, who had appeared in February dressed in jackets and ties, Mick Jagger wore a sweatshirt, prompting the show's producers to tell the Stones' manager later, "We were deluged with mail protesting the untidy appearance—clothes and hair of your Rolling Stones. Before even discussing the possibility of a contract, I would like to learn from you, whether your young men have reformed in the matter of dress and shampoo." Nevertheless, the band would return six months later.
- Phan Khac Suu was installed as the new President of South Vietnam as part of the military leaders' promise to make the transition to a civilian government. He would serve less than eight months before being ousted on June 14.
- Born:
  - Nicole Hohloch Seibert, German singer who performs under her first name; in Saarbrücken, West Germany
  - Kevin Michael Richardson, American voice actor for animated shows and video games; in The Bronx
- Died: General Terentii Shtykov, 57, Russian officer who was the military administrator of the Soviet occupation of the Korean peninsula above the 38th parallel from 1945 to 1948 and guided the establishment of the socialist government of North Korea.

== October 26, 1964 (Monday) ==
- Ten days into his new administration, British Prime Minister Harold Wilson addressed the nation and announced a 15 percent surcharge on all imported manufactured goods in order to combat the nation's trade deficit, as well as tax rebates to encourage British exports.
- In an interview for Missiles and Rockets magazine, NASA Associate Administrator Robert C. Seamans, Jr., announced that starting in July 1965, NASA would concentrate on developing the three-astronaut Apollo spacecraft (which was initially called "Apollo X"), the successor to the two-person Gemini spacecraft which had followed the one-person Mercury spacecraft. Seamans said that a long-duration space station program would not receive funding for actual hardware development until the 1970s, but Apollo X would not compete with the Manned Orbiting Laboratory (MOL) program. Seamans commented that "MOL is important for the military as a method of determining what opportunities there are for men in space. It is not suitable to fulfill NASA requirements to gain scientific knowledge."
- NASA astronaut Russell L. Schweickart spent eight days testing the Gemini space suit to evaluate Gemini biomedical recording instruments. While in the suit, the astronaut flew several zero-g flight profiles, went through a simulated four-day Gemini mission, and experienced several centrifuge runs.
- Born: Marc Lépine, Canadian mass murderer who shot and killed 14 women in 1989 before killing himself; in Montreal
- Died:
  - Eric Edgar Cooke, 33, Australian serial killer, became the last person executed in Western Australia. He had murdered eight people and committed a total of 22 violent crimes in Perth between 1959 and 1963. Only two more convicts would be put to death in Australia after Cooke, with Glen Sabre Valance hanged on November 24, 1964, in South Australia, and Ronald Ryan on February 3, 1967, in Victoria.
  - Max McGraw, 81, American industrialist CEO of the McGraw-Edison company, and founder of its predecessor, McGraw Electric, and of Centel.

== October 27, 1964 (Tuesday) ==
- Ronald Reagan, at the time "a supposedly washed-up actor" whose last leading role in a movie had been in 1957's Hellcats of the Navy, appeared in a nationally televised speech that launched him into a new career that would make him President of the United States. The address, which would later be referred to as "A Time for Choosing", had been given earlier at a fundraiser for Republican presidential nominee Barry Goldwater in Los Angeles. A group of California businessmen were so impressed by Reagan that they purchased 30 minutes of airtime on NBC to broadcast the speech again; Goldwater's national campaign headquarters tried to get Reagan to cancel the program because of fears that it was "too incendiary", and Reagan refused unless he heard from Goldwater himself. Reagan told his audience, "We have come down to a time for choosing. Either we accept the responsibilities for our own destinies, or we abandon the American Revolution and confess that a little intellectual elite in a far distant capital can plan our lives for us better than we can plan ourselves." Reagan's endorsement was so appealing to conservatives that it "raised more than a half-million dollars for the Republican Party, and when he finished it, Ronald Reagan was a national political figure."
- The Ayatollah Ruhollah Khomeini, a Shi'ite Muslim religious leader in Iran, appeared at the city of Qom and gave an anti-government speech that would get him exiled for 14 years, but that would also identify him as the most prominent foe of Iran's monarch, the Shah Reza Pahlavi and the future leader of the Islamic Republic of Iran. The address, titled The Granting of Capitulatory Rights to the United States, was a response to the recent passage of the "law of capitulation" that gave U.S. servicemen in Iran diplomatic immunity from local prosecution. "The government has sold our independence, reduced us to the level of a colony, and made the Muslim nation of Iran appear more backward than savages in the eyes of the world!" He added that "If the religious leaders have influence, they will not permit some agent of America to carry out these scandalous deeds; they will throw him out of Iran."
- As the Congo Crisis deepened, Christophe Gbenye offered to negotiate for the safe passage of white settlers (60 Americans and 800 Belgians) from Stanleyville and other areas controlled by the Simba Rebellion.
- Died: Pierre C. Cartier, 86, French jeweler

== October 28, 1964 (Wednesday) ==
- Canada's Prime Minister Pearson announced that Mount Kobau near Penticton, British Columbia would be the site of the Queen Elizabeth II Observatory, with a 150-inch (3,800 mm) telescope that would be second only to the 200-inch (5,100 mm) Mount Palomar telescope in California. Cost overruns and "objections from university-based astronomers who wanted a better site" would lead to the cancellation of the project in 1968.
- The Irish television police show, Garda Patrol, was broadcast for the first time, as a weekly show on the Raidió Teilifís Éireann (RTE) network. Sergeant Tommy Burns of Ireland's national police agency, the Garda Síochána, would explain to viewers that the objectives of the program were "to offer advice on how to defeat the criminal and outsmart him in his efforts and secondly to seek your help in bringing offenders to justice."
- The Wednesday Play, a British anthology series, began the first of six seasons on the BBC1 network and, in its first two seasons "changed the face of television drama in Britain, introducing contemporary, social-issue drama", and later "initiating a technological breakthrough by moving over to film and location shooting... out of the studio and into the real world."
- The East German ship MV Magdeburg capsized after colliding with the Japanese ship MV Yamashiro Maru off Broadness Point in the United Kingdom, dumping its entire cargo of 42 British Leyland buses into the Thames river. The buses had been sold to Cuba in spite of American requests that Britain not trade with the regime of Fidel Castro.
- The municipal government of the Indian city of Bangalore demolished a monument that had been built by the British to commemorate the British lives lost in the 1791 Siege of Bangalore. For 15 years, the city had resolved to get rid of the memorial as a symbol of the British conquest of India.
- Died: Harold Hitz Burton, 76, Associate Justice of the U.S. Supreme Court from 1945 to 1958, former U.S. Senator for Ohio and former Mayor of Cleveland

== October 29, 1964 (Thursday) ==
- The design for the new official Flag of Canada was selected by a multi-party committee of Members of Parliament, who chose the emblem of a single red maple leaf on a field of white between two red bars by a vote of 10 to 4. The Canadian Flag Committee acknowledged that almost 2,000 suggestions for the design were submitted and that these had been grouped into three categories; those in "Class C" (designs that contained either or both the British Union Jack and the Quebec fleur-de-lis) were rejected by a 5 to 9 vote; the remaining choices were in "Class A", a three maple leaf design proposed by Prime Minister Pearson and narrowly retained 8 to 6; and "Class B", a single maple leaf design, which members liked 13 to 1. The three leaf design was unanimously rejected, 14 to 0, and the final vote on the single red maple leaf between two red bars came down to "whether or not the final selection was acceptable as a national flag for Canada".
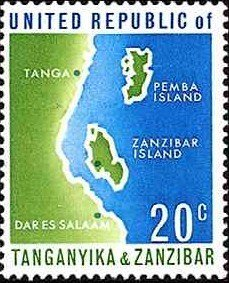
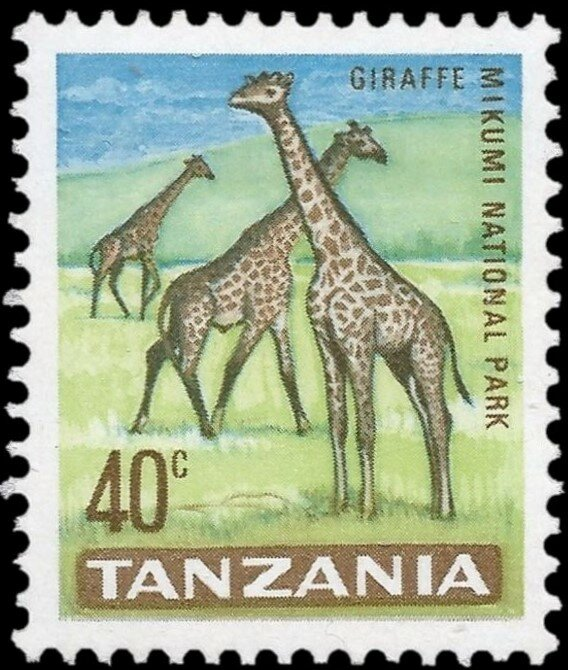
The old name and the new name
- President Julius Nyerere of the United Republic of Tanganyika and Zanzibar announced in Dar es Salaam that the East African's nation was now Tanzania. The new name was to be pronounced as "tan-zuh-NEE-uh", with an accent on the third syllable, but remains frequently mispronounced as "tan-ZAY-nee-uh". A contest had been announced in July, and the winner received 200 East African shillings, worth 28 U.S. dollars at the time. According to one researcher, External Affairs Minister Oscar Kambona chaired the committee that screened proposals from 1,354 people, of whom 16 independently came up with the name "Tanzania", and that other popular suggestions included "Tangibar", "Tanzan" and (based on the language of both countries before the merger) "Swahili". The prize was divided among the 16 winners, who each got 12½ shillings (worth $1.75).
- Charles H. Townes of the United States and Nikolay Basov and Alexander Prokhorov of the Soviet Union were jointly awarded the Nobel Prize in Physics for their development of the laser, while Dorothy Crowfoot Hodgkin of the United Kingdom won the Nobel Prize in Chemistry for determining the atomic structure of biochemical substances through x-ray crystallography.
- The Star of India, a 565-carat (113-gram) blue star sapphire, was stolen from the American Museum of Natural History in New York City, along with the 100-carat DeLong Star Ruby, another sapphire (the "Midnight Star"), and 19 other priceless gemstones. The jewelry would be recovered in January 1965 from a Miami bus locker.
- Born: Yasmin Le Bon, British supermodel; as Yasmin Parvaneh in Oxford
- Died: Henry Larsen, 65, Norwegian-born Canadian Arctic explorer

== October 30, 1964 (Friday) ==
- At New Delhi, India's Prime Minister Lal Bahadur Shastri hosted Prime Minister Sirimavo Bandaranaike of Ceylon (now Sri Lanka) and the two leaders signed what has come to be known as the "Sirima–Shastri Pact", though its official name was the "Agreement on Persons of Indian Origin in Ceylon". Under the pact, Indian Tamils (those people whose ancestry was from the Tamil Nadu state of south India who had come to the island of Ceylon during British rule), were to be afforded the opportunity of repatriation from Ceylon to India, or Ceylonese citizenship. India agreed to accept up to 525,000 Tamil immigrants from Ceylon, while Ceylon agreed to offer citizenship to as many as 300,000 Tamils who wished to stay. The two nations agreed that the fate of another 150,000 of the 975,000 Indian Tamils in Ceylon would be decided later.
- Buffalo wings, according to the more commonly accepted account, were first served at the Anchor Bar in Buffalo, New York, by Teressa Bellissimo, a story that has been cited more often in publications. However, another restaurateur, John Young, has also received recognition as having invented the appetizer in 1964 at his place of business, "Wings 'n' Things".
- In a response to ongoing anti-government riots, Ibrahim Abboud, the president of the Sudan, resigned his post as the northeast African nation's prime minister, and Sirr Al-Khatim Al-Khalifa formed a new government.
- Nguyen Khanh resigned as Prime Minister of South Vietnam after less than two months, and was replaced by Tran Van Huong.

== October 31, 1964 (Saturday) ==
- Making a final campaign stop three days before the U.S. presidential elections, U.S. President Lyndon Johnson first used the phrase "the Great Society" to describe his program for social reform in the United States. Addressing a rally at Madison Square Garden in New York City, Johnson strongly criticized his Republican opponent, U.S. Senator Barry Goldwater, and told his audience, "This Nation, this people, this generation, has man's first opportunity to create the Great Society", which he described as "a society of success without squalor, beauty without barrenness, works of genius without the wretchedness of poverty." In a twist on Goldwater's declaration that "extremism in the defense of liberty is no vice... moderation in the pursuit of justice is no virtue", Johnson said, "as far as the American people are concerned, extremism in the pursuit of the Presidency is an unpardonable vice, and moderation in the affairs of the nation is the highest virtue."
- Satellite laser ranging (SLR) was first demonstrated as a laser pulse was fired from an observation station on Earth (NASA's Goddard Space Flight Center in Greenbelt, Maryland) to a retroreflector on an orbiting satellite (the recently launched Explorer 22). Fifty years later, an international network of 40 SLR stations would track multiple orbiting space missions.
- A tornado caused the collapse of the hangar of the Primero Gruppo Elicotteri (First Helicopter Group), Italian Navy, at the Naval Air Station at Catania, destroying five Sikorsky SH-34G Seabat helicopters.
- Jack Roland Murphy, known as "Murph the Surf", was arrested in Miami, along with an accomplice, and charged with the October 29 theft of the Star of India and other priceless gems.
- Born: Marco van Basten, Netherlands soccer football forward and manager who played for Ajax and AC Milan in a 15-year career, as well as the Netherlands national team; he later managed the national team; in Utrecht

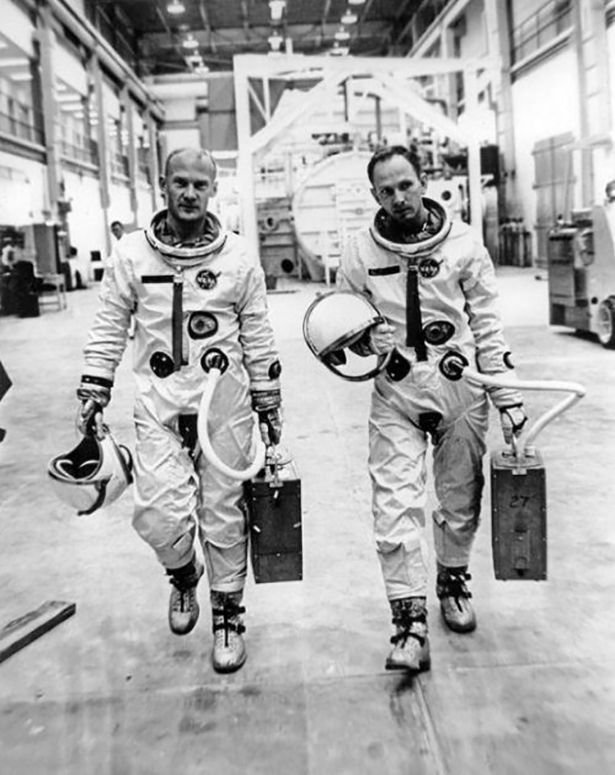
NASA astronauts Buzz Aldrin (left) and Theodore Freeman, the day before Freeman's death

- Died:
  - Theodore Freeman, 34, American astronaut in training for the Gemini program, was killed in a collision with a goose that smashed through the cockpit canopy of his T-38 Talon jet during a routine flight at Ellington AFB near Houston. Flying shards of plexiglas from the canopy entered the jet engine intake, causing both engines to flame out. A report concluded that Freeman apparently attempted to land the crippled jet at the air base and, failing that, tried to avoid colliding with the buildings on the base; and that Freeman ejected only 100 feet (30 m) from the ground, leaving insufficient time for his parachute to deploy fully.
  - Tuomas Bryggari, 82, Finnish trade unionist, politician, and member of the Parliament of Finland (1922–1948)
