= Allan I. Carswell Astronomical Observatory =

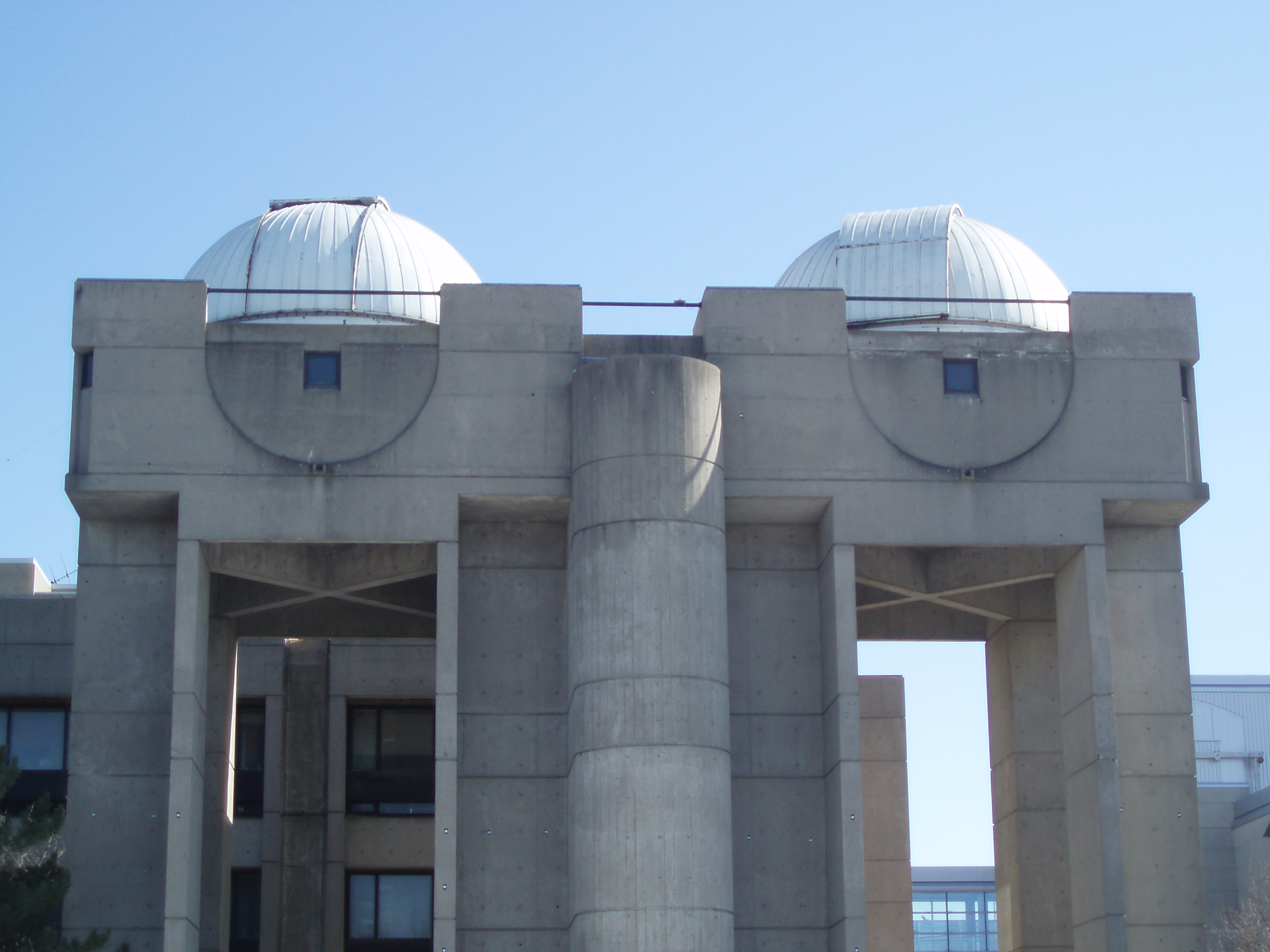
- The Allan I. Carswell Astronomical Observatory building
- Alternative names: Allan I. Carswell Astronomical Observatory
- Organization: York University
- Observatory code: H79
- Location: Toronto, Ontario, Canada
- Coordinates: 43.7739°N 79.5073°W
- Altitude: 196 metres (643 ft)
- Established: 1969
- Website: Allan I. Carswell Astronomical Observatory

Telescopes
- Telescope 1: 1.0 m reflector
- Telescope 2: 0.6 m reflector
- Related media on Commons

The Allan I. Carswell Astronomical Observatory, formerly known as the York University Astronomical Observatory, is an astronomical observatory owned and operated by York University. It is located in the North York district of Toronto, Ontario, Canada. Opened in 1969, York's observatory is opened to both researchers and amateur astronomers. The observatory was renamed the Allan Ian Carswell Astronomical Observatory in 2017 after York University Emeritus Professor of Physics Allan Carswell.

The observatory owns two telescopes housed in separate domes: a 60 cm (24 in) Cassegrain reflector, and a 1 m (39 in) custom-built telescope, the largest at a university in Canada. Other smaller portable telescopes are available for visitor use. Telescopes 1 and 2 are located at the main building at Petrie, and the remainder at Arboretum Observing Facility on the roof of the Arboretum Parking Garage. The observatory's 40 cm cassegrain telescope, usually used for public outreach and observing, was replaced by a 1-metre telescope in August 2019, with the 40 cm telescope moved to the Arboretum Observing Facility.

The observatory is open to the public every Wednesday evening, and also hosts public viewing sessions for special events, such as Astronomy Day in 2006, Earth Hour and Science Rendezvous in 2008. There is no admission cost to visit the observatory.

Like the David Dunlap Observatory, York's location is subject to nearby light pollution. York is located away from residential neighbourhoods, but it is still subject to lights on campus and the surrounding business at the Keele location.

== Gallery ==
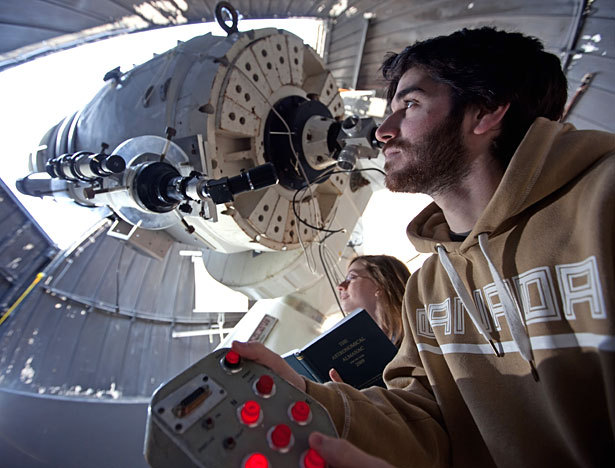
60 cm telescope

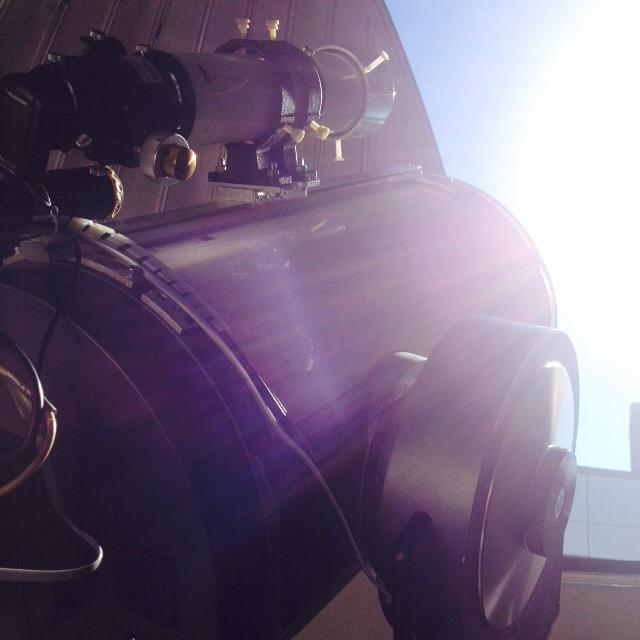
Solar Observing Clear skies

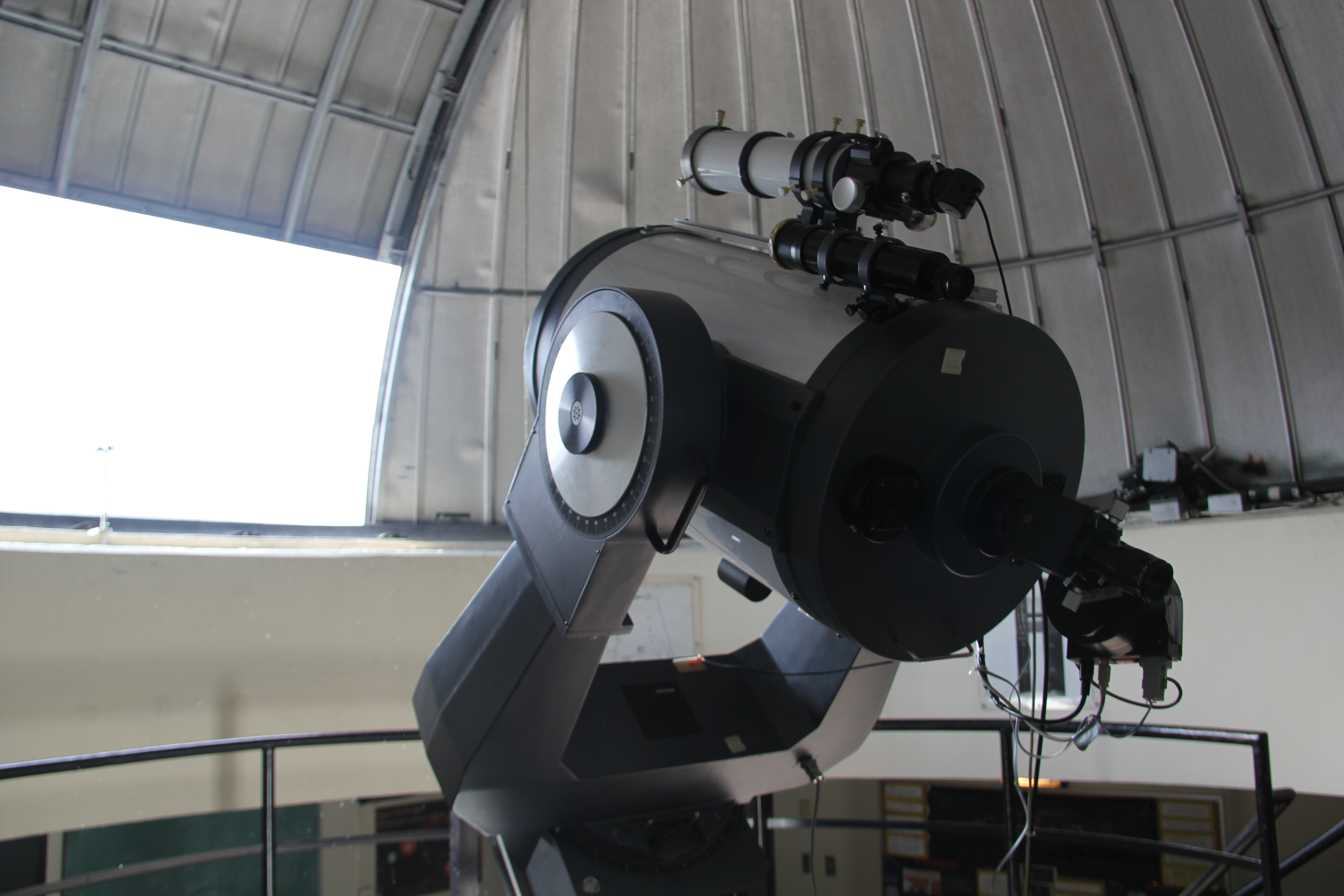
The 40 cm Meade

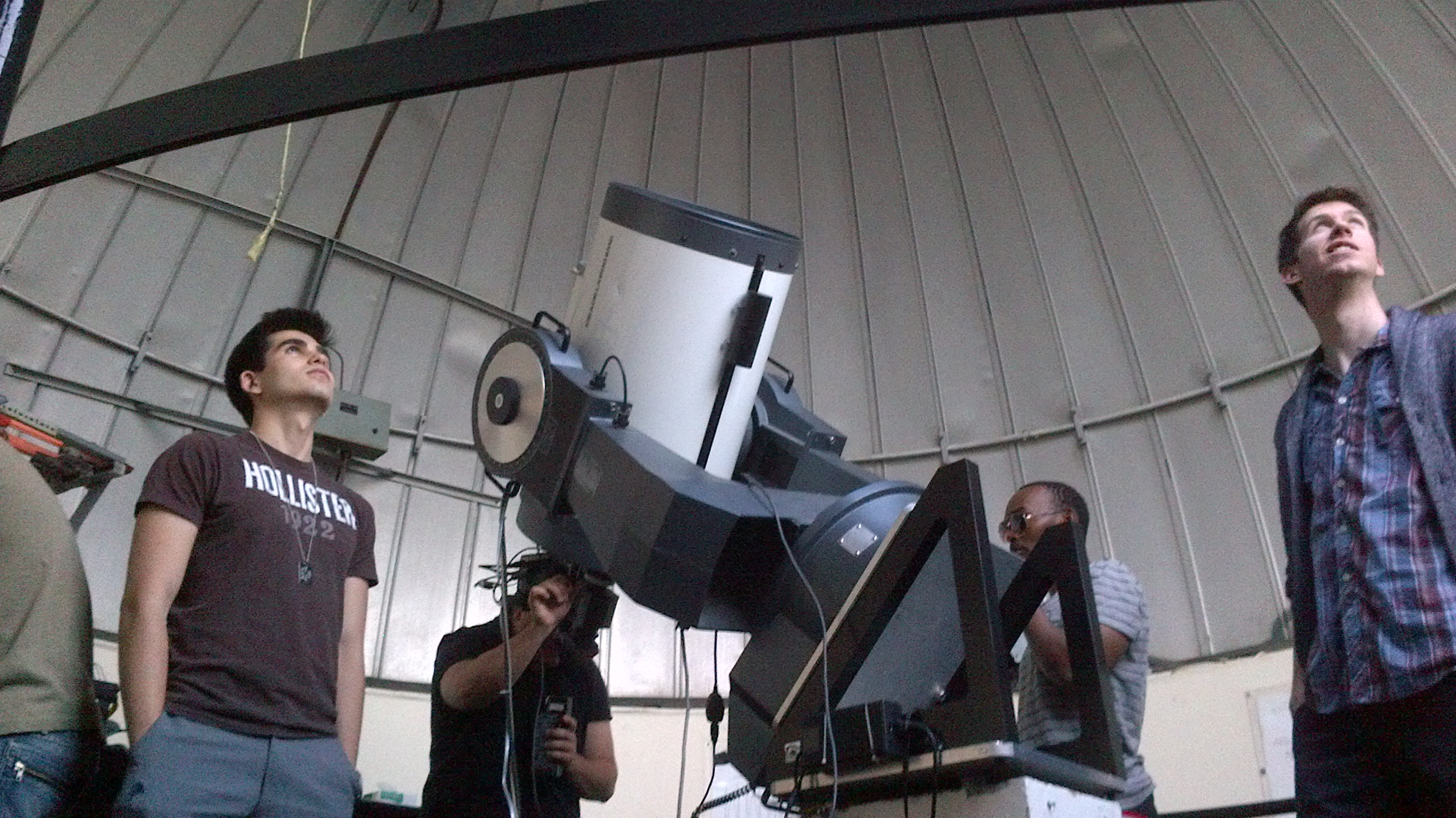
Public Viewing

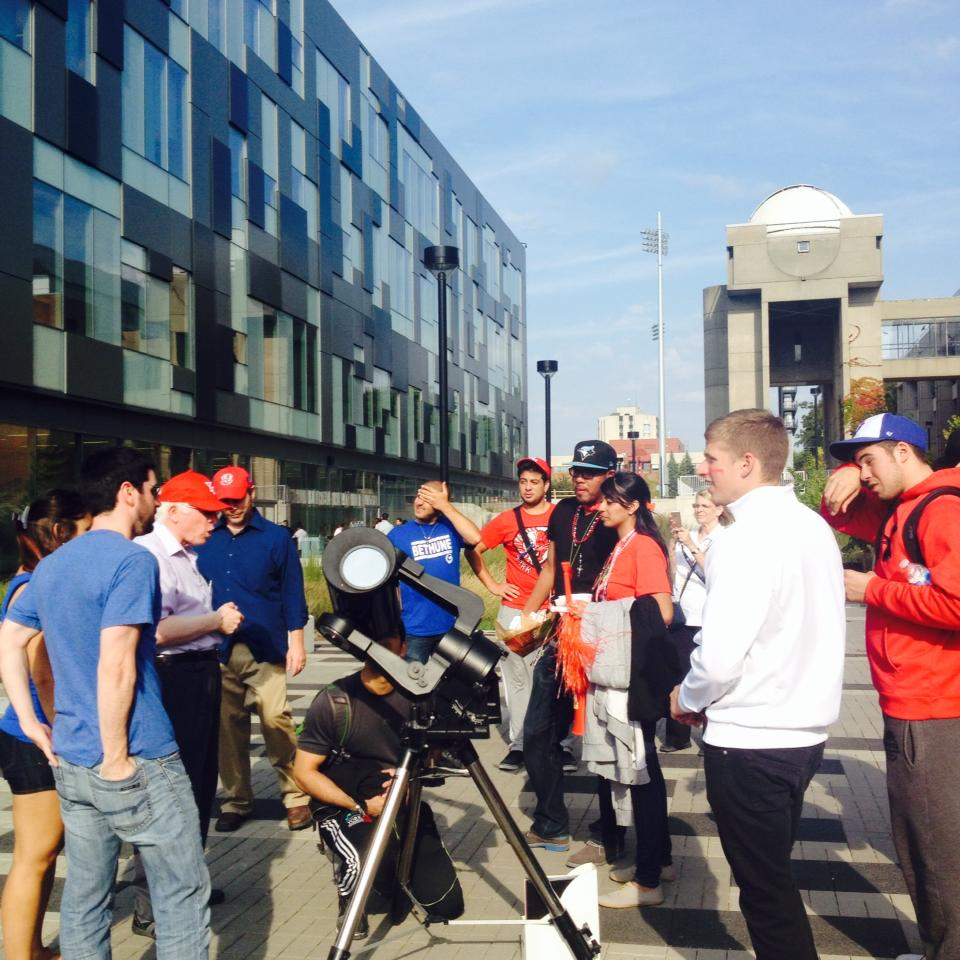
Solar Observing

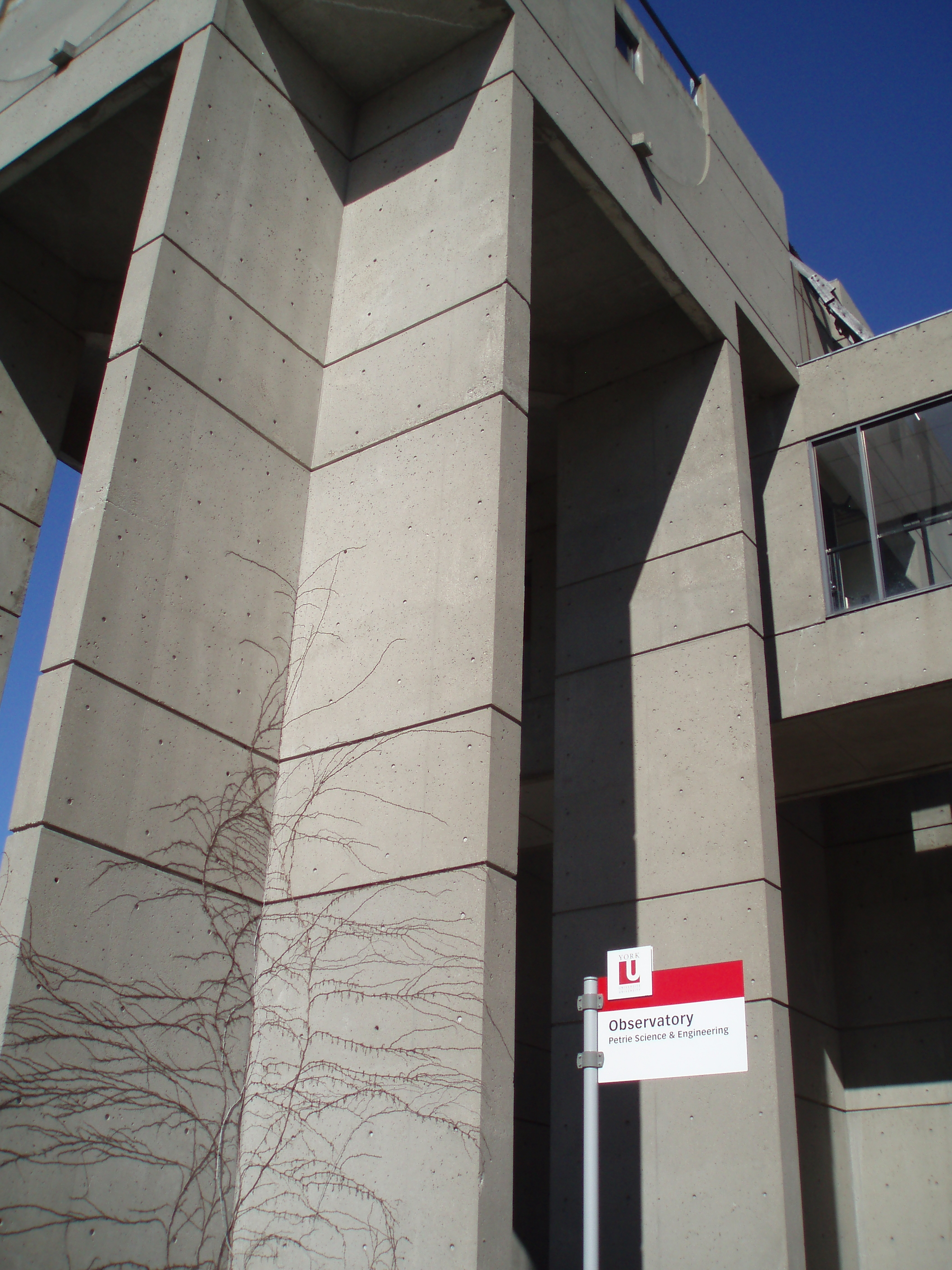
The entrance

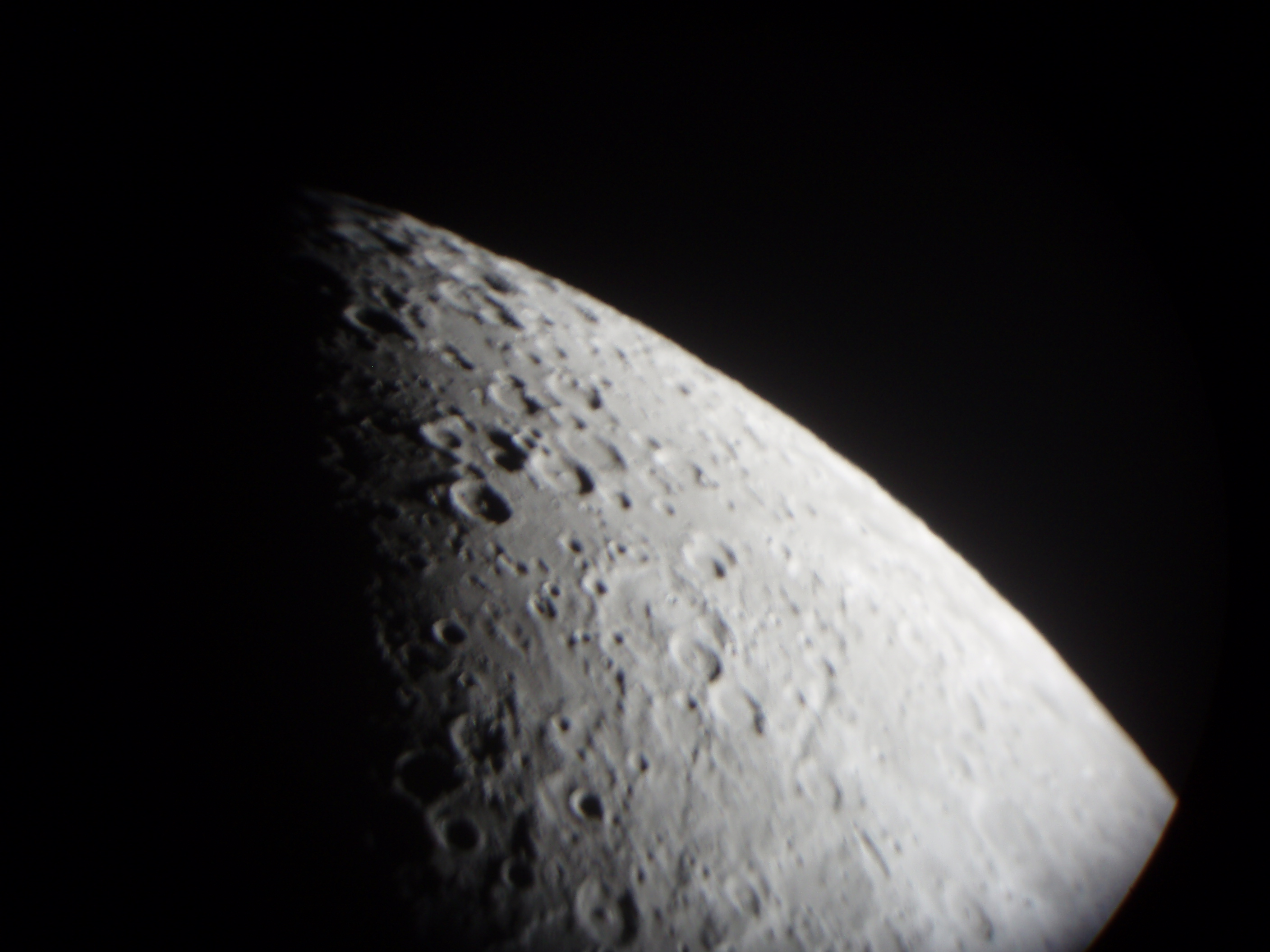
Moon surface through the 40 cm Meade

== See also ==
- David Dunlap Observatory - Richmond Hill, Ontario (formerly of the University of Toronto)
- Toronto Magnetic and Meteorological Observatory - University of Toronto St. George campus
- List of astronomical observatories in Canada
- List of observatories
