= Rothney Astrophysical Observatory =

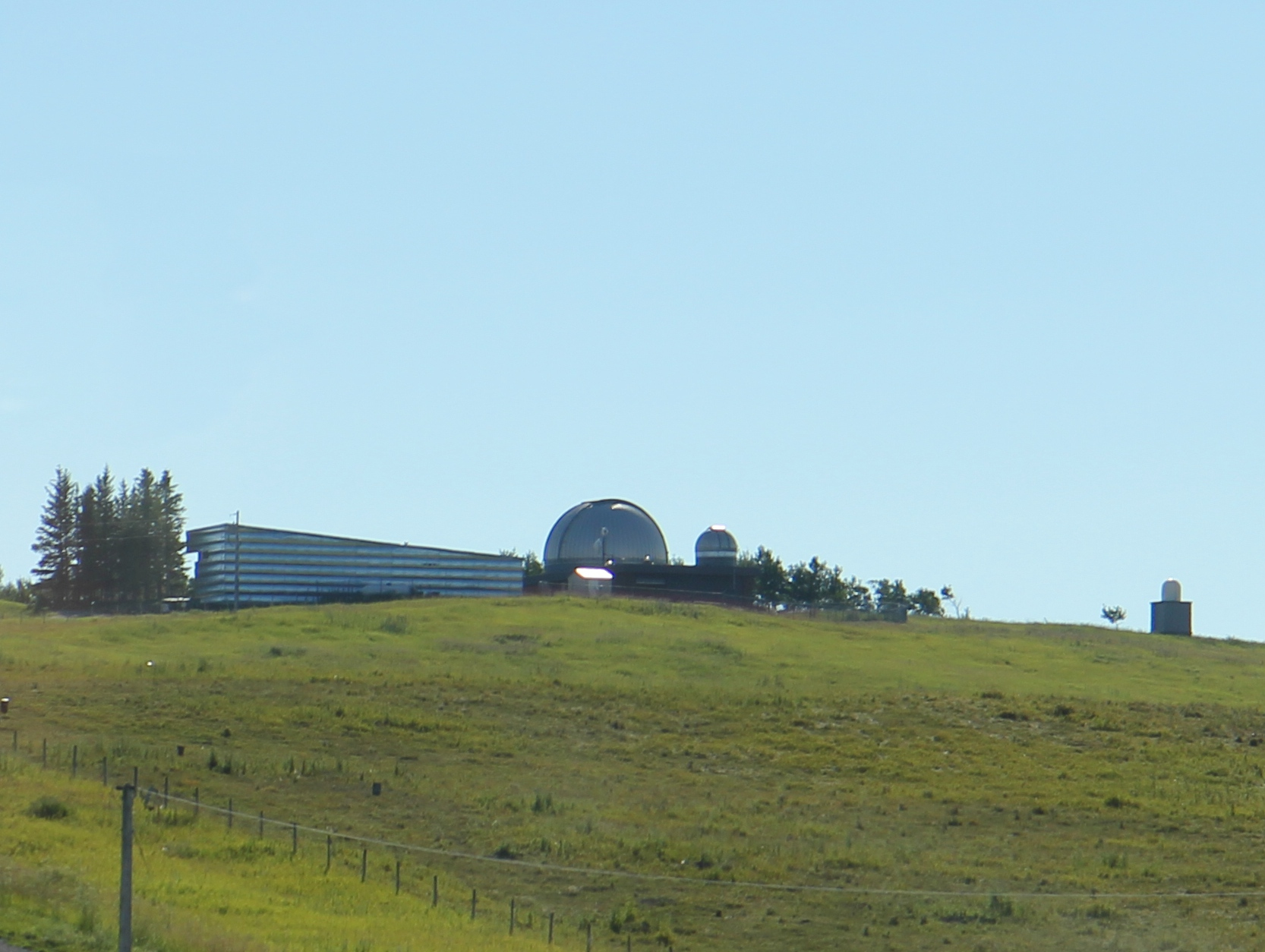
- Organization: University of Calgary
- Observatory code: 661
- Location: near Priddis, Alberta
- Coordinates: 50.8684°N 114.2910°W
- Altitude: 1,269 metres (4,163 ft)
- Established: 1972
- Website: Rothney Astrophysical Observatory

Telescopes
- A.R. Cross Telescope: 1.8 m reflector
- Kaylie Green Memorial Telescope: 0.5 m reflector
- Clark-Milone Telescope: 0.4 m reflector
- Related media on Commons

The Rothney Astrophysical Observatory (RAO) is an astronomical observatory located near the hamlet of Priddis, Alberta, Canada, about 20 kilometres (12 mi) southwest of Calgary. The observatory is owned and operated by the University of Calgary (UC), and was dedicated in 1972. The facility is used for research, undergraduate and graduate teaching, and public outreach. Research performed at the RAO included a variable star search program, follow-up observations of variable star discoveries, and detailed investigation of binary stars. An outstanding minor planet search program was also performed with comet discoveries by Rob Cardinal. The RAO is a link in the Skynet Robotic Telescope Network.

== Telescopes ==
- The 1.8 m (71 in) A.R. Cross Telescope (ARCT) is a Ritchey-Chrétien design dedicated in 1987. It is attached to an unusual altitude-altitude (alt-alt) mount which allows greater access to northern skies than other mounts. It was originally equipped with 1.5 m (59 in) metal mirror acquired many years earlier, but even before the telescope was completed, plans were made to acquire a conventional mirror. This new primary was fabricated in the 1980s and, under a cost-sharing agreement, used from 1990 to 1993 at Apache Point Observatory. The glass mirror was finally installed in 1996. The telescope is equipped with the Rapid Alternate Detection System (RADS) developed at UC. The computer-controlled "chopping" of the secondary mirror enables observers to perform differential photometry with the telescope.
- The 0.5 m (20 in) Kaylie Green Memorial Telescope (KGMT) was built in 1957 and donated in 1981 to RAO by the Canadian Forces Base Cold Lake. It is a modified Cassegrain reflector which was used to track satellites under a United States Air Force program. The original altitude-altitude-azimuth mount was replaced with a simpler equatorial mount when the telescoped was refurbished in 2004. DFM Engineering performed the work with the help of UC. The telescope was renamed in 2024, when it was dedicated to Kaylie Green.
- The 0.4 m (16 in) Clark-Milone Telescope (CMT), named after former co-directors Alan Clark and Eugene Milone, was installed at RAO in 1972. It was used to develop RADS in the early 1980s.

== See also ==
- Dominion Astrophysical Observatory
- List of astronomical observatories in Canada
- List of astronomical observatories
