= Eugene Milone =

American astronomer

- Born: 1939 (age 86–87); New York City, New York, United States
- Education: Columbia University (BA); Yale University (PhD)

Eugene Frank Milone (born 1939) is an American astronomer. He received a bachelor's degree from Columbia University in 1961, and a PhD in astronomy from Yale University. After teaching for several years at Gettysburg College where he was assistant professor of Physics, he re-located in 1971 to the University of Calgary, where he served as Director of the Rothney Astrophysical Observatory.

Milone has published many technical papers in various areas of astronomical research, particularly specializing in variable stars and photometry and archaeoastronomy, and has served on several professional committees.
