= Wilkinson Memorial Observatory =

Coordinates: 49°28′40″N 108°50′43″W

The Wilkinson Memorial Observatory is an observatory located four kilometers south of Eastend, Saskatchewan. Built in 1953, it is managed by the Eastend Astronomy Club.

== History ==
In the early 1940s, amateur astronomer Jack Wilkinson began building telescopes. In 1949, Wilkinson constructed an 8-inch reflector telescope with hand-crafted lenses and carefully ground mirrors. Wilkinson, enthusiastic about his work, invited other locals to use his telescope to view the moon, planets, and distant galaxies. He constructed mounts from repurposed industrial equipment, including the cap of a steam boiler. In 1950, he built an observatory near the Livery barn which he owned. Wilkinson’s original 8-inch reflector telescope is preserved at the Eastend Historical Museum.

After Wilkinson's death in 1953, the observatory dome, once housed atop the local school building, was relocated to its current site on land donated by the Gregory family. The Eastend Astronomical Society was formed to honor Wilkinson's legacy and continues to oversee the observatory.

== Current status ==
Today, the observatory features a Celestron Ultima 11” telescope with a 2800mm focal length, eyepieces ranging from 40mm to 10.5mm, various filters, and a GoTo Tracking System. Visitors can observe the rings of Saturn, track the International Space Station, and view distant nebulae.

The local astronomy club organizes guided night sky tours, hands-on telescope demonstrations, and educational workshops on celestial phenomena. Visitors can learn to navigate the night sky, observe planets and stars, and gain insights into astronomical events.
