= Mount Kobau National Observatory =

Proposed astronomical observatory in British Columbia, since canceled

- Named after: Elizabeth II
- Organization: Ministry of Mines and Technical Surveys
- Location: Mount Kobau, British Columbia, Canada
- Coordinates: 49°06′54″N 119°40′32″W
- Altitude: 1,873 m (6,145 ft)

Telescopes
- Queen Elizabeth II Telescope: 3.81 m Cassegrain

The Mount Kobau National Observatory (originally the Queen Elizabeth II Observatory) was a proposed astronomical observatory in southern British Columbia, Canada.

== Background ==
In the early part of the 20th century, Canada was the home of the second and third largest astronomical telescopes in the world: the 1.88 m (74 inch) reflector at the David Dunlap Observatory in Richmond Hill, Ontario and the 1.82 m (72 inch) Plaskett telescope at the Dominion Astrophysical Observatory in Saanich, British Columbia. However, by the early 1960s these telescopes had dropped to 13th and 17th largest in the world.

In order to regain prominence in the field of astronomy, in 1963 the Director of the DAO Dr. R. M. Petrie proposed the construction of a national observatory, with a 3.81 m (150 inch) telescope as the primary instrument. Upon completion, this would have been the second largest telescope in the world, the only larger telescope being the 5.08 m (200 inch) Hale Telescope at Palomar Observatory in California.

== Location ==
The criteria for the selection of an observatory site were several. The site had to have an elevation of at least 4,000 feet (1,200 m) (in order to keep atmospheric turbulence to a minimum), not be subject to rapid changes in weather or extreme temperature, and be distant from industrial and population centres. These conditions restricted the observatory to southern British Columbia or Alberta. Five sites were initially studied (3 in BC and 2 in Alberta), before settling on Mount Kobau in British Columbia. A 16-inch (410 mm) telescope was set up on a temporary basis to confirm the site quality. Canadian Prime Minister Lester Pearson officially announced the observatory location on October 28, 1964. The observatory was originally named in honour of Queen Elizabeth II to commemorate her visit to Canada in the fall of 1964. It was later decided to name the observatory after the site selected, and instead name the telescope after Queen Elizabeth II.

== Opposition ==
Construction began the following summer, with the mountain top being levelled and a road carved up the mountain. As work progressed, opposition within the Canadian astronomical community grew, as it was felt by some that a site of much higher quality could be obtained outside of Canada.

== Cancellation ==
The Mount Kobau National Observatory was cancelled on August 29, 1968. The unfinished 150-inch mirror for the Queen Elizabeth II Telescope was stored until sold in 1986. It is believed that the mirror blank was melted down and recycled. The 16-inch telescope remained on the site until 1981, when it was dismantled. Today Mount Kobau is used by amateur astronomers, and is the site of the Mount Kobau Star Party.

== See also ==
- List of the largest optical telescopes in North America

== Bibliography ==
- Hodgson, John H. "The Heavens Above and the Earth Beneath-A History of the Dominion Observatories Part 2: 1946-1970" Geological Survey of Canada, 1994
- "Queen Elizabeth II Observatory", Queen's printer and Controller of Stationery, Ottawa, 1964
- "Mount Kobau National Observatory Report on Preliminary Studies: Optical Shop", A. B. Sanderson & Company, Victoria, British Columbia, March 1966
- E. Brosterhus, E. Pfannenschmidt, F. Younger. "Observing Conditions on Mount Kobau", Journal of the Royal Astronomical Society of Canada Vol. 66, No. 1, February 1972, pg 1.
