= List of astronomical observatories =

Legend
Space observatory
Gravitational-wave detector
Antimatter observatory
Airborne observatory
Radio observatory
Microwave observatory
Ground-based observatory
Solar observatory
Neutrino detector
Cosmic-ray observatory
Educational observatory

This is a partial list of astronomical observatories ordered by name, along with initial dates of operation (where an accurate date is available) and location. The list also includes a final year of operation for many observatories that are no longer in operation. While other sciences, such as volcanology and meteorology, also use facilities called observatories for research and observations, this list is limited to observatories that are used to observe celestial objects.

Astronomical observatories are mainly divided into four categories: space-based, airborne, ground-based, and underground-based.

Many modern telescopes and observatories are located in space to observe astronomical objects in wavelengths of the electromagnetic spectrum that cannot penetrate the Earth's atmosphere (such as ultraviolet radiation, X-rays, and gamma rays) and are thus impossible to observe using ground-based telescopes. Being above the atmosphere, these space observatories can also avoid the effects of atmospheric turbulence that plague ground based telescopes, although new generations of adaptive optics telescopes have since then dramatically improved the situation on the ground. The space high vacuum environment also frees the detectors from the ancestral diurnal cycle due to the atmospheric blue light background of the sky, thereby increasing significantly the observation time.

An intermediate variant is the airborne observatory, specialised in the infrared wavelengths of the electromagnetic spectrum, that conduct observations above the part of the atmosphere containing water vapor that absorbs them, in the stratosphere.

Historically, astronomical observatories consisted generally in a building or group of buildings where observations of astronomical objects such as sunspots, planets, asteroids, comets, stars, nebulae, and galaxies in the visible wavelengths of the electromagnetic spectrum were conducted. At first, for millennia, astronomical observations have been made with naked eyes. Then with the discovery of optics, with the help of different types of refractor telescopes and later with reflector telescopes. Their use allowed to dramatically increase both the collecting power and limit of resolution, thus the brightness, level of detail and apparent angular size of distant celestial objects allowing them to be better studied and understood. Following the development of modern physics, new ground-based facilities have been constructed to conduct research in the radio and microwave wavelengths of the electromagnetic spectrum, with radio telescopes and dedicated microwave telescopes.

Modern astrophysics has extended the field of study of celestial bodies to non-electromagnetic vectors, such as neutrinos, neutrons and cosmic rays or gravitational waves. Thus, new types of observatories have been developed. Interferometers are at the core of gravitational wave detectors. In order to limit the natural or artificial background noise, most particle detector based observatories are built deep underground.

== Observatories ==
Name	Established	Location
Abastumani Astrophysical Observatory	1932	Abastumani, Georgia
Abu Reyhan-e Birooni Observatory	1976	Shiraz University, Shiraz, Iran
Adirondack Public Observatory		Tupper Lake, New York, US
Aditya-L1	2023	Sun-Earth L1
Adolphson Observatory	2013	Monmouth, Illinois, US
Airdrie Public Observatory	1896	Airdrie, Scotland, UK
Aker Observatory	1995	Safford, Arizona, US
Aldershot Observatory	1906	Aldershot, Hampshire, England, UK
Algonquin Radio Observatory	1959	Algonquin Provincial Park, Ontario, Canada
Allegheny Observatory	1859	Pittsburgh, Pennsylvania, US
Ametlla de Mar Observatory	1992	l'Ametlla de Mar, Catalonia, Spain
AMiBA	2006	Mauna Loa, Hawaii, US
Anderson Mesa Station	1959	Flagstaff, Arizona, US
Andrushivka Astronomical Observatory	2001	Andrushivka, Zhytomyr Oblast, Ukraine
Angell Hall Observatory	1927	Ann Arbor, Michigan, US
Ankara University Observatory	1963	Gölbaşı, Ankara, Turkey
Antarctic Muon and Neutrino Detector Array	2002	Antarctica
Antarctic Submillimeter Telescope and Remote Observatory	1994–2005	Antarctica
ANTARES	2008	In the Mediterranean Sea near Toulon, France
Apache-Sitgreaves Observatory	2005	Overgaard, Arizona, US
Apache Point Observatory	1985	Sunspot, New Mexico, US
Apatity Cosmic-Ray Station		Apatity, Russia
Apollo Observatory	1969	Dayton, Ohio, US
Arcetri Observatory		Arcetri, Florence, Italy
Arecibo Observatory	1963	Arecibo, Puerto Rico, US
Argentine Institute of Radio Astronomy	1966	Berazategui Partido, Buenos Aires Province, Argentina
Armagh Observatory	1790	Armagh, UK
Aryabhatta Research Institute of Observational Sciences	1954	Nainital, Uttarakhand, India
Ashton Observatory	1983	Baxter, Iowa, US
Asiago Astrophysical Observatory	1942	Asiago, Italy
Assheton Observatory	1860	Lancashire, UK
ASTRON: Dwingeloo Radio Observatory; LOFAR; Westerbork Synthesis Radio Telescope	1949	Dwingeloo, Netherlands
Astron (defunct)	1983–1989	Highly eccentric Earth orbit
Astronomical Observatory Aurora	2011	Hechingen, Germany
Astronomical Observatory of Lisbon	1867	Lisbon, Portugal
Astronomy Centre	1982	Todmorden, England
Astronomy Tower of the Sorbonne	1885–1909 (only for amateur use since 1980)	Paris, France
Astrophysical Institute Potsdam	1992	Potsdam, Germany
Astrophysical Observatory of Javalambre	2009	Teruel, Spain
Atacama Pathfinder Experiment (APEX)	2003	Llano de Chajnantor Observatory, Chile
Australia Telescope Compact Array	1988	Narrabri, Australia
Australian Astronomical Observatory	1971	Coonabarabran, Australia
Badlands Observatory	2000	Quinn, South Dakota, US
Baikal Deep Underwater Neutrino Telescope	1993	Baikal Lake, Russia
Bangladesh Astronomical Observatory	2015	Dhaka, Bangladesh
Baker Observatory	1980	Marshfield, Missouri, US
Baksan Neutrino Observatory	1977	Prielbrusye, Baksan Valley, Russia
Ball State University Observatory		Muncie, Indiana, US
Barnard Observatory (defunct)	1859	Oxford, Mississippi, US
Bareket Observatory	1990	Maccabim, Israel
Barnett Observatory	1960	Chesterfield, England, UK
Bayfordbury Observatory	1969	Hertfordshire, England, UK
Behlen Observatory	1972	Mead, Nebraska, US
Beijing Astronomical Observatory	1958	Beijing, China
Beijing Ancient Observatory	1442	Beijing, China
Belgrade Observatory	1887	Belgrade, Serbia
Belogradchik Observatory	1961	Belogradchik, Bulgaria
Benito Loyola Observatory	2024	Virginia Beach, Virginia, US
Benmore Peak Observatory	1996	Mackenzie Basin, South Island, New Zealand
BeppoSAX (defunct)	1996–2003	Low Earth orbit
Bergisch Gladbach Observatory	1995	Bergisch Gladbach, Germany
Berlin Observatory	1711	Berlin, Germany
Besançon Observatory	1882	Besançon, France
Beverly-Begg Observatory	1922	Dunedin, South Island, New Zealand
Bidston Observatory	1849	Bidston, England, UK
Big Bear Lake Solar Observatory	1969	Big Bear City, California, US
Bisdee Tier Optical Astronomy Observatory	2010	Bisdee Tier, Spring Hill, Tasmania, Australia
Black Moshannon Observatory (defunct)	1972	Pennsylvania, US
Blackett Observatory	1930s	Wiltshire, England, UK
Blue Mesa Observatory (defunct)	1967	New Mexico, US
Boambee Observatory	1987	Boambee, New South Wales, Australia
Bohyunsan Optical Astronomy Observatory (BOAO)	1996	Youngchun, South Korea
BOOTES	1985	Spain
Bordeaux Observatory	1878	Floirac, France
Bosscha Observatory	1923	Lembang, West Java, Indonesia
Boswell Observatory (defunct)	1883	Crete, Nebraska, US
Bowman Observatory	1940	Greenwich, Connecticut, US
Boyden Observatory	1889	Bloemfontein, South Africa
Bradstreet Observatory	1996	St. Davids, Pennsylvania, US
Brackett Observatory	1908	Pomona College, Claremont, California, US
Bradley Observatory	1950	Decatur, Georgia, US
Braeside Observatory (defunct)	1976	Flagstaff, Arizona, US
Brera Observatory	1764	Milan, Italy
Bridgewater State University Observatory	2012	Bridgewater, Massachusetts, US
Brooks Observatory		Toledo, Ohio, US
Brooks Astronomical Observatory	1964	Mount Pleasant, Michigan, US
Brorfelde Observatory	1953	Holbæk, Denmark
Bucharest Astronomical Observatory	1910	Bucharest, Romania
Bucknell Observatory		Lewisburg, Pennsylvania, US
Burrell Memorial Observatory	1940	Berea, Ohio, US
Byurakan Observatory	1946	Mount Aragats, Armenia
Cagigal Observatory	1888	Caracas, Venezuela
Cagliari Observatory	1899	Cagliari, Sardinia, Italy
Calais Observatory (defunct)	1857	Calais, Maine, US
Calar Alto Observatory	1975	Almería, Spain
Caltech Submillimeter Observatory (defunct)	1986	Mauna Kea, Hawaii, US
Cambridge Observatory	1823	Cambridge, UK
Camille Flammarion Observatory	1883	Juvisy-sur-Orge, France
Campbelltown Rotary Observatory	2000	Campbelltown, NSW, Australia
Campo Imperatore Near-Earth Object Survey	2001	Campo Imperatore, Italy
Canopus Hill Observatory		Hobart, Tasmania, Australia
Capilla Peak Observatory	1947	Albuquerque, New Mexico, US
Capodimonte Observatory	1812	Naples, Italy
Carruthers Geocorona Observatory	2025	Earth–Sun L1 point
Carter Observatory	1937	Wellington, New Zealand
Catania Astrophysical Observatory		Catania, Italy
Cawthron Atkinson Observatory	1883	Nelson, New Zealand
Celestial Observatory		Russellville, Arkansas, US
Centennial Observatory	2004	Twin Falls, Idaho, US
Center for Astrophysics | Harvard & Smithsonian	1973	Cambridge, Massachusetts, US
Cerro Armazones Observatory	1995	Atacama Desert, Chile
Cerro Tololo Inter-American Observatory	1962	Atacama Desert, Chile
Cerro Pachón Observatory	2000	Atacama Desert, Chile
Chabot Space & Science Center	1883	Oakland, California, US
Chamberlin Observatory	1890	Denver, Colorado, US
Changchun Astronomical Observatory		Changchun, Jilin Province, China
Chandra X-ray Observatory	1999	Highly eccentric Earth orbit
Chianti Polifunctional Observatory	2013	San Donato in Poggio, Florence, Italy
Chico Community Observatory	2001	Chico, California, US
Chilbolton Observatory	1967	Chilbolton, UK
Cima Ekar Observing Station	1966	Asiago, Italy
Cincinnati Observatory	1843	Cincinnati, Ohio, US
City Observatory, Edinburgh	1818	Edinburgh, Scotland, UK
Clarke Observatory	1897 / 1923	Dunkirk, New York / Alliance, Ohio, US
Class of 1951 Observatory	1997	Poughkeepsie, New York, US
Cloudcroft Observatory (defunct)	1962	New Mexico, US
Coats Observatory	1883	Paisley, Scotland, UK
Coit Observatory		Boston, Massachusetts, US
Collins Observatory	2003	Corning, New York, US
Collm Observatory		Leipzig, Germany
Colombo University Observatory	1920s	Colombo, Sri Lanka
Compton Gamma-Ray Observatory (defunct)	1991–2000	Low Earth orbit
ÇOMÜ Ulupınar Observatory	2002	Çanakkale, Turkey
Concordia College Observatory		Moorhead, Minnesota, US
Consell Observatory	1987	Mallorca, Spain
Copenhagen University Observatory	1861	Copenhagen, Denmark
Cordell–Lorenz Observatory		Sewanee, Tennessee, US
COROT	2006	Polar orbit
Cosmic Background Imager (CBI) (defunct)	1999	Llano de Chajnantor Observatory, Chile
Côte d'Azur Observatory	1988	France
Crane Observatory		Topeka, Kansas, US
Crawford Observatory	1880	Cork, Ireland
Creighton University Observatory (defunct)	1886–1955	Omaha, Nebraska, US
Crimean Astrophysical Observatory	1945	Nauchnyi, Crimea
Črni Vrh Observatory	1975	Idrija, Slovenia
Cupillari Observatory		La Plume, Pennsylvania, US
Custer Observatory	1927	Southold, New York, US
The Cyprus Planetarium & Observatory	2023	Nicosia, Cyprus
Daniel S. Schanck Observatory (defunct)	1865	Rutgers University, New Brunswick, New Jersey, US
Daniel Scholl Observatory (defunct)	1886–1966	Lancaster, Pennsylvania, US
Daocheng Solar Radio Telescope	2022	Daocheng County, Garze Tibetan Autonomous Prefecture, Sichuan Province, China.
Dark Sky Observatory	1981	Phillips Gap, Wilkes County, North Carolina, US
Dark Matter Particle Explorer (DAMPE)	2015	500 km LEO
Darling's Observatory (defunct)	1917	Duluth, Minnesota, US
Dearborn Observatory	1889	Evanston, Illinois, US
Detroit Observatory	1854	Ann Arbor, Michigan, US
David Dunlap Observatory	1935	Richmond Hill, Ontario, Canada
Dome C		Antarctica
Dominion Observatory	1905	Ottawa, Ontario, Canada
Dominion Astrophysical Observatory	1918	Saanich, British Columbia, Canada
Dominion Radio Astrophysical Observatory	1960	Kaleden, British Columbia, Canada
Dunsink Observatory	1785	Dublin, Ireland
Durham University Observatory	1839	Durham, UK
Dyer Observatory	1953	Brentwood, Tennessee, US
Effelsberg 100-m Radio Telescope	1972	Bonn, Germany
Ege University Observatory	1965	Kemalpaşa, İzmir, Turkey
Einstein Probe	2024	Low Earth orbit
Einstein Observatory (defunct)	1978	Low Earth orbit
Elginfield Observatory	1969	Middlesex Centre, Ontario, Canada
Ellis Observatory	2004	Sterling Hill Mining Museum, Ogdensburg, New Jersey, US
Embry-Riddle Observatory	2005	Daytona Beach, Florida, US
Entoto Observatory Space Science Research Center	2012	Mount Entoto, Ethiopia
Eskdalemuir Observatory	1908	Dumfries and Galloway, Scotland, UK
Euclid Telescope	2023	Earth–Sun L_{2} Lagrangian point
European Southern Observatory: La Silla Observatory; New Technology Telescope; Llano de Chajnantor Observatory; Very Large Telescope; Paranal Observatory; European Extremely Large Telescope	1962: 1969; 1989; 2005; 1998; 1999; 2026	Atacama Desert, Chile
Fabra Observatory	1906	Barcelona, Spain
Fan Mountain Observatory	1966	Albemarle County, Virginia, US
Five-hundred-meter Aperture Spherical Radio Telescope	2013	Duyun, Pingtang County, Guizhou Province, China
Félix Aguilar Observatory	1965	San Juan, Argentina
Fernbank Observatory		Atlanta, Georgia, US
Fermi Gamma-ray Space Telescope	2008	Low Earth orbit
Fick Observatory	1966	Boone, Iowa, US
Five College Radio Astronomy Observatory (defunct)	1976–2011	New Salem, Massachusetts, US
Flarestar Observatory		San Gwann, Malta
Foggy Bottom Observatory	1951	Hamilton, New York, US
Foothill Observatory		Los Altos Hills, California, US
Ford Observatory	1998	Ithaca, New York, US
Fox Observatory		Sunrise, Florida, US
Fox Park Public Observatory	1999	Potterville, Michigan, US
Francis Marion University Observatory	1982	Florence, South Carolina, US
Fred Lawrence Whipple Observatory	1968	Mount Hopkins, Arizona, US
Fremont Peak Observatory	1986	San Juan Bautista, California, US
Frosty Drew Observatory	1980s	Charlestown, Rhode Island, US
Fuertes Observatory	1917	Ithaca, New York, US
Galaxy Evolution Explorer (GALEX)	2003	Caltech, Jet Propulsion Laboratory, California, US
Gaocheng Astronomical Observatory	1276	Dengfeng, Henan, China
Gauribidanur Radio Observatory	1976	Gauribidanur, Karnataka, India
Gemini Observatory	1999	Southern Operations Center: La Serena, Chile; Northern Operations Center: Hilo, Hawaii, US
George Observatory	1989	Brazos Bend State Park, near Houston, Texas, US
Giant Meterwave Radio Telescope (GMRT)	1995	Pune, Maharashtra, India
Gifford Observatory	1912	Wellington, New Zealand
Girawali Observatory	2006	Pune, Maharashtra, India
Glen D. Riley Observatory	1973	Naperville, Illinois, US
Godlee Observatory	1902	Manchester, England, UK
Goodsell Observatory	1887	Northfield, Minnesota, US
Goethe Link Observatory	1939	Brooklyn, Indiana, US
Goldendale Observatory	1973	Goldendale, Washington, US
Gornergrat (HFSJG) (defunct)	1967–2005	Gornergrat, Switzerland
Granat (defunct)	1989–1999	Highly eccentric Earth orbit
Gran Telescopio Canarias	2006	Canary Islands, Spain
Grant O. Gale Observatory	1984	Grinnell, Iowa, US
Green Bank Telescope	2000	Green Bank, West Virginia, US
Green Point Observatory	1961	Sutherland, New South Wales, Australia
Grenfell Observatory	2012	Corner Brook, Newfoundland and Labrador, Canada
Griffith Observatory	1935	Los Angeles, California, US
Guillermo Haro Observatory	1972	Cananea, Sonora, Mexico
Gyarah Sidi		Agra, Uttar Pradesh, India
HALCA (defunct)	1997–2005	Elliptical Earth-centered orbit
Haleakala Observatory		Maui, Hawaii, US
Halley Observatory	1987	Heesch, Netherlands
Hamburg Observatory	1803	Hamburg, Germany
Hat Creek Radio Observatory	1950s	Shasta County, California, US
Hard Labor Creek Observatory		Atlanta, Georgia, US
Space Hard X-Ray Modulation Telescope (HXMT)	2017	550 km LEO
Hartung–Boothroyd Observatory	1974	Ithaca, New York, US
Hartebeesthoek Radio Astronomy Observatory	1961	Gauteng, South Africa
Hartwell House	1831	Hartwell, Buckinghamshire, UK
Harvard College Observatory	1839	Cambridge, Massachusetts, US
Haute-Provence Observatory	1937	Alpes-de-Haute-Provence, France
Haystack Observatory	1964	Westford, Massachusetts, US
Hector J Robinson Observatory	1964	Lincoln Park, Michigan, US
Helium and Lead Observatory	2012	Sudbury, Ontario, Canada
Helmos Observatory	2007	Mount Helmos, Greece
Helsinki University Observatory	1834	Helsinki/Kirkkonummi, Finland
Herrett Observatory	2004	Twin Falls, Idaho, US
Herschel Space Observatory	2009	Earth–Sun L2 point
Hidden Valley Observatory	1960s	Rapid City, South Dakota, US
Hida Observatory, Kyoto University	1968	Takayama, Gifu, Japan
Heyden Observatory, Georgetown University	1844	Washington, D.C., US
High Altitude Water Cherenkov Observatory	2015	Sierra Negra, Puebla, Mexico
High Energy Stereoscopic System	2002	Khomas Region, Namibia
Highland Road Park Observatory	1997	Baton Rouge, Louisiana, US
Hinode	2006	Low Earth orbit
Hirsch Observatory	1942	Troy, New York, US
Hobbs Observatory	1974	Fall Creek, Wisconsin, US
Hoher List Observatory	1954	Daun, Germany
Holcomb Observatory and Planetarium	1954	Indianapolis, Indiana, US
Hong Kong Observatory	1883	Tsim Sha Tsui, Kowloon, Hong Kong
Hoober Observatory	1993	Rotherham, UK
Hopkins Observatory	1838	Williamstown, Massachusetts, US
Howell Observatory		Starkville, Mississippi, US
Hradec Králové Observatory	1961	Hradec Králové, Czech Republic
Huairou Solar Observing Station		Beijing, China
Hubble Space Telescope	1990	Low Earth orbit
Huggins Observatory defunct	1856	London, England, UK
Hume Cronyn Memorial Observatory	1940	London, Ontario, Canada
Hutton-Westfold Observatory	2009	Melbourne, Australia
Hyde Memorial Observatory	1977	Lincoln, Nebraska, US
IceCube Neutrino Observatory	2010	Amundsen–Scott South Pole Station, Antarctica
Indian Astronomical Observatory	2001	Hanle, Ladakh, India
Insperity Observatory	2008	Humble, Texas, US
Instituto de Astrofísica de Canarias	1975	Canary Islands, Spain
INTEGRAL	2002	Highly eccentric Earth orbit
Infrared Astronomical Satellite (IRAS) (defunct)	January–November 1983	Earth orbit
Infrared Space Observatory (ISO) (defunct)	1995–1998	Earth orbit
Innsbruck Observatory		Innsbruck, Austria
IRAM 30m telescope	1984	Pico Veleta, Spain
IRAM Plateau de Bure Interferometer	1988	Gap, Hautes-Alpes, France
Iranian National Observatory	2022	Mount Gargash, Iran
Isaac Newton Group of Telescopes	1979	La Palma, Spain
Isaac Roberts' Observatory (defunct)	1890	Crowborough, UK
Iso-Heikkilä Observatory (defunct)	1935 (only amateur use since 1972)	Turku, Finland
Constantinople Observatory of Taqi ad-Din	1577	Constantinople, Turkey
Istanbul University Observatory	1936	Istanbul, Turkey
Istituto Ricerche Solari Locarno, IRSOL	1960	Locarno, Switzerland
IXPE	2021	Earth orbit
Jack C. Davis Observatory	2002	Carson City, Nevada, US
Astronomical Observatory of the Jagiellonian University	1792	Kraków, Poland
James Clerk Maxwell Telescope	1987	Mauna Kea, Hawaii, US
James Gregory Telescope	1962	St. Andrews, UK
James Webb Space Telescope	2021	Earth–Sun L_{2} Lagrangian point
James Wylie Shepherd Observatory	2009	Montevallo, Alabama, US
Jakarta Observatory	1968	Jakarta, Indonesia
Jantar Mantar	1727	Jaipur, Rajasthan, India
Jena Observatory	1962	Jena, Germany
Jewett Observatory	1953	Pullman, Washington, US
Jodrell Bank Observatory	1945	Cheshire, England, UK
JAC Johor Astronomy	2014	Johor, Malaysia
Jones Observatory	1936	Chattanooga, Tennessee, US
Jordan Hall of Science	2006	Notre Dame, Indiana, US
Judson B. Coit Observatory		Boston, Massachusetts, US
KAIRA	2011	Kilpisjarvi, Finland
Khajeh Nasiredin Observatory	~1980	Tabriz University, Tabriz, Iran
Kamioka Observatory	1983	Hida, Gifu, Japan
Kanzelhoehe Solar Observatory	1943	Villach, Austria
Karl Schwarzschild Observatory	1960	Jena, Germany
Keck Observatory	1993	Mauna Kea, Hawaii, US
Keeble Observatory	1963	Ashland, Virginia, US
Keele Observatory	1962	Keele University, England, UK
Kennon Observatory	1939	Oxford, Mississippi, US
Kepler Space Observatory	2009	Earth-trailing heliocentric orbit
Kevola Observatory	1963	Kevola, Finland
Kielder Observatory	2008	Kielder Forest, Northumberland, England, UK
King's Observatory (defunct)	1769	Greater London, England, UK
Kirkwood Observatory	1901	Bloomington, Indiana, US
Kiso Observatory	1974	Mount Ontake, Japan
Kitami Observatory	1987	Hokkaidō, Japan
Kitt Peak National Observatory	1958	Tucson, Arizona, US
Kleť Observatory	1957	České Budějovice, Czech Republic
Kodaikanal Solar Observatory	1899	Palani, Tamil Nadu, India
Konkoly Observatory	1871	Budapest, Hungary
Kopernik Observatory & Science Center	1974	Vestal, New York, US
KOSMA observatory	1985–2010	Gornergrat, Switzerland
Kottamia Astronomical Observatory	1964	Cairo Governorate, Egypt
Kryoneri Observatory	1972	Mount Kyllini, Greece
Kuffner observatory	1884	Vienna, Austria
Kuiper Airborne Observatory (retired)	1974	14 km in the stratosphere
Kwasan Observatory, Kyoto University	1929	Kyoto, Japan
Kvistaberg Observatory	1948	Bro, Sweden
Kyung Hee Observatory	1992	Seoul, South Korea
Laboratoire d'Astrophysique de Grenoble	2001	Grenoble, France
Observatorio de La Cañada (La Cañada Observatory)	2002	Ávila, Spain
Ladd Observatory	1891	Providence, Rhode Island, US
Lake Afton Public Observatory	1979	Wichita, Kansas, US
Lamont–Hussey Observatory (defunct)	1928	Bloemfontein, South Africa
Landessternwarte Heidelberg-Königstuhl	1898	Königstuhl, Heidelberg, Germany
Landolt Astronomical Observatory	1939	Baton Rouge, Louisiana, US
La Plata Astronomical Observatory	1883	La Plata, Argentina
La Silla Observatory	1969	Atacama Desert, Chile
Large Binocular Telescope Observatory	2005	Mount Graham, Arizona, US
Large High Altitude Air Shower Observatory (LHAASO)	2019	Daocheng County, Sichuan, China
Large Sky Area Multi-Object Fibre Spectroscopic Telescope (LAMOST)	2009	Xinglong Station, Hebei, China
Large Millimeter Telescope	2011	Sierra Negra, Puebla, Mexico
Las Brisas Observatory	1979	Colorado, US
Las Campanas Observatory		La Serena, Chile
Langkawi National Observatory	2012	Langkawi Island, Malaysia
Las Cumbres Observatory Global Telescope	2005	Global network
Laws Observatory	1880	Columbia, Missouri, US
Leander McCormick Observatory	1885	Mount Jefferson, Charlottesville, Virginia, US
Lee Observatory	1873	American University of Beirut, Beirut, Lebanon
Leiden Observatory	1633	Leiden University, Leiden, Netherlands
Leipzig Observatory		Leipzig, Germany
Leoncito Astronomical Complex	1986	Calingasta, San Juan, Argentina
Levenhagen Observatory		Seattle, Washington, US
Lick Observatory	1881	Mount Hamilton, San Jose, California, US
LightBuckets (commercial observatory)	2007	Rodeo, New Mexico, US
LIGO	1999	Hanford Site, Washington, US & Livingston, Louisiana, US, US
Lindheimer Astrophysical Research Center (defunct)	1966–1995	Evanston, Illinois, US
Llano de Chajnantor Observatory	2005	Atacama Desert, Chile
Llano del Hato National Astronomical Observatory	1975	Mérida, Venezuela
Lockyer Technology Centre	2010	Sidmouth, Devon, England, UK
Long Wavelength Array	2010	Socorro, New Mexico, US
Longa Vista Observatory	2010	Itatiba, SP, Brazil
Lowell Observatory: Anderson Mesa Station	1894: 1959	Flagstaff, Arizona, US
Lucknow (King of Oudh's) Observatory	1832–1848	Lucknow, India
Lulin Observatory	1999	Mount Lulin, Taiwan
Lund Observatory	1749	Lund, Sweden
Luoxue Mountain Cosmic Rays Research Center	1953	Luoxue Mountain, Yunnan Province, China
Lyon Observatory	1878	Saint-Genis-Laval, France
Macalester College Observatory		Saint Paul, Minnesota, US
Macfarlane Observatory defunct	1757	Glasgow, Scotland, UK
Magdalena Ridge Observatory: Magdalena Ridge Observatory Single Telescope; Magdalena Ridge Observatory Interferometer	2006: 2008; Under construction	Socorro County, New Mexico, US
Mallorca Observatory	1991	Mallorca, Spain
Malakoff Tower	1845	Recife, Brazil
Manastash Ridge Observatory	1972	Ellensburg, Washington, US
Manuel Foster Observatory (defunct)	1903	Santiago, Chile
Maragheh Observatory	1259	Maragheh, Iran
Margaret M. Jacoby Observatory	1978	Warwick, Rhode Island, US
Maria Mitchell Observatory	1908	Nantucket, Massachusetts, US
Marina Towers Observatory (Not In Use)	1989	Maritime Quarter, Swansea, Wales, UK
Markree Observatory (defunct)	1837	County Sligo, Ireland
Marseille Observatory		Marseille, France
Martz Observatory		Chautauqua County, New York, US
Mauna Kea Observatory	1967	Mauna Kea, Hawaii, US
Mauna Loa Solar Observatory		Hawaii, US
Maynard F. Jordan Observatory	1901	Orono, Maine, US
McDonald Observatory		Davis Mountains, Texas, US
McKim Observatory	1884	Greencastle, Indiana, US
McMath–Hulbert Solar Observatory	1930	Lake Angelus, Michigan, US
MDM Observatory		Kitt Peak, Arizona, US
Mead Observatory	2001	Columbus, Georgia, US
Medicina Radio Observatory	1965	Medicina, Bologna, Italy
Mees Observatory		Rochester, New York, US
Mehalso Observatory		Erie, Pennsylvania, US
Melbourne Observatory	1862	Melbourne, Victoria, Australia
Melton Memorial Observatory	1928	Columbia, South Carolina, US
Mendenhall Observatory	2002	Stillwater, Oklahoma, US
Menke Observatory	1994	Davenport, Iowa, US
Metsähovi Observatory	1966	Kirkkonummi, Finland
Meudon Observatory	1876	Meudon, France
Meyer–Womble Observatory	1996	Mount Evans, Colorado, US
Michigan State University Observatory	1969	East Lansing, Michigan, US
Observatoire Midi-Pyrénées: Pic du Midi Observatory; Toulouse Observatory	1878; 1733	Headquarters: Toulouse, France: Pyrenees, France; Toulouse, France
Milagro	1999	Los Alamos, New Mexico, US
Miller Observatory	1976	Maiden, North Carolina, US
Mills Observatory	1935	Dundee, Scotland, UK
Mind's Eye Observatory IAU W42	2018	Sebastian, Florida, US
MMT Observatory	1979	Mount Hopkins, Arizona, US
Modine-Benstead Observatory	1963	Union Grove, Wisconsin, US
Modra Observatory	1988	Modra, Slovakia
Mohr Observatory (demolished)	1765–1780	Jakarta, Indonesia
Moletai Astronomical Observatory	1969	Moletai, Lithuania
Molonglo Observatory Synthesis Telescope (MOST)	1960	Bungendore, New South Wales, Australia
Mont Mégantic Observatory	1978	Mont Mégantic, Québec, Canada
Monterey Institute for Research in Astronomy (Oliver Observing Station)	1972 (1984)	Chews Ridge, California & Monterey, California, US
Montevideo National Observatory		Montevideo, Uruguay, 34°54.6′S 56°12.8′W
Moore Observatory	1978	Oldham County, Kentucky, US
Morgan–Monroe Observatory	1966	Morgan–Monroe State Forest, Indiana, US
Morris Observatory	1973	North Manchester, Indiana, US
Morrison Observatory		Fayette, Missouri, US
Moscow Cosmic-Ray Station		Troitsk, Russia
Mount Stony Brook Observatory	1968	Stony Brook, New York, US
Mounds Observatory		Tulsa, Oklahoma, US
Mount Abu InfraRed Observatory	1995	Mount Abu, Rajasthan, India
Mount Burnett Observatory	1972	Mount Burnett, Victoria, Australia
Mount Cuba Astronomical Observatory		Greenville, Delaware, US
Mount Graham International Observatory	1993	Mount Graham, Arizona, US
Mount John University Observatory	1965	Lake Tekapo, South Island, New Zealand
Mount Laguna Observatory	1968	San Diego, California, US
Mount Lemmon Observatory		Tucson, Arizona, US
Mount Pleasant Radio Observatory		Tasmania, Australia
Mount Stromlo Observatory	1911	Canberra, Australia
Mount Suhora Observatory	1987	Gorce Mountains, Poland
Mount Wilson Observatory	1904	Mount Wilson, Los Angeles County, California, US
Mountain Skies Observatory	1997	Lyman, Wyoming, US
Mullard Radio Astronomy Observatory	1957	Cambridge, England, UK
Murchison Radio-astronomy Observatory	2012	Murchison, Western Australia, Australia
Mykolaiv Astronomical Observatory	1821	Mykolaiv, Mykolaiv Oblast, Ukraine
Nachi-Katsuura Observatory		Nachikatsuura, Wakayama, Japan
Nançay Radio Telescope	1965	Nançay, France
Nanjing Astronomical Instruments Research Centre	1958	Nanjing, Jiangsu Province, China
National Astronomical Observatory (Colombia)	1803	Bogotá, Colombia
National Astronomical Observatory of Japan	1988	Headquarters: Mitaka, Tokyo, Japan
National Astronomical Observatory (Mexico)	1967	Sierra San Pedro Mártir, Baja California, Mexico
National Observatory (Brazil)	1827	Rio de Janeiro, Brazil
National Observatory of Athens	1842	Athens, Greece
National Optical Astronomy Observatory: Cerro Tololo Inter-American Observatory; Gemini Observatory; Kitt Peak National Observatory; National Solar Observatory	1982	Headquarters: Tucson, Arizona, US
National Optical Observatory		Turkey
National Radio Astronomy Observatory: Atacama Large Millimeter Array; Green Bank Telescope; Very Large Array; Very Long Baseline Array	1957	Headquarters: Charlottesville, Virginia, US
National Research Institute of Astronomy and Geophysics (NRIAG)	1903	Helwan, Egypt
National Solar Observatory	1952	Sunspot, New Mexico, US & Kitt Peak, Arizona, US
Naval Research Lab. Radio Sta.		Sugar Grove, West Virginia, US 38°31.2′N 79°16.4′W
Naylor Observatory	1971	Harrisburg, Pennsylvania, US
Neuchâtel Observatory	1858	Neuchâtel, Switzerland
Nha Trang Observatory	2017	Nha Trang, Vietnam
Nice Observatory	1879	Nice, France
Nieuwland Hall (Napoleon III Telescope)	1959	Notre Dame, Indiana, US
Nizamia Observatory	1907	Hyderabad, India
Nordic Optical Telescope	1988	Canary Islands, Spain
Norilsk Cosmic-Ray Station		Norilsk, Krasnoyarsk Krai, Russia
Norman Lockyer Observatory	1912	Sidmouth, UK
Northern Arizona University Observatory		Flagstaff, Arizona, US
Northern Skies Observatory	2009	Peacham, Vermont, US
Northolt Branch Observatory	2015	London, England, UK
Northolt Branch Observatory 2, Shepherd's Bush	2016	London, England, UK
Northolt Branch Observatory 3, Blandford Forum	2017	London, England, UK
North Georgia Astronomical Observatory		Dahlonega, Georgia, US
North Otago Astronomical Society Observatory		Oamaru, South Island, New Zealand
Nyrölä Observatory	1997	Jyväskylän maalaiskunta, Western Finland Province, Finland
OAC (Observatorio Astronómico de Córdoba)	1871	Córdoba, Argentina
OAO (Observatorio de Aras de los Olmos)	2008	Aras de los Olmos, Valencia, Spain
O'Brien Observatory	1961	Marine on St. Croix, Minnesota, US
Observatoire du Pic de Château-Renard	1974	Saint-Véran, France
Observatorio Astronómico Nacional (Colombia)	1803	Bogotá, Colombia
Observatorio Astronomico Nacional Tonantzintla	1961	Tonantzintla, Mexico
Observatorio Solar Carl Sagan	2000	Hermosillo, Sonora, Mexico
Observatory House (defunct)	1789	Slough, UK
Observatory of the rue Serpente (defunct)	1890–1968	Paris, France
Oil Region Astronomical Observatory		Venango County, Pennsylvania, US
Onan Observatory	1990	Norwood Young America, Minnesota, US
Ondokuz Mayıs University Observatory	2006	Samsun, Turkey
Ondřejov Observatory	1898	Ondřejov, Czech Republic
Onsala Space Observatory	1949	Onsala, Sweden
Ooty Radio Telescope	1970	Ooty, Tamil Nadu, India
Orchard Hill Observatory	1965	Amherst, Massachusetts, US
Orioloromano Observatory	2007	Oriolo Romano, Italy
Orion 1 (defunct)	1971	Low Earth orbit
Orion 2 (defunct)	1973	Low Earth orbit
Orion Ranch Observatory	2009	Bertram, Texas, US
Orwell Park School Observatory	1848	Nacton, UK
Ostrowik Observatory	1952	Ostrowik, Poland
Otter Creek Observatory	1995	Meade County, Kentucky, US
Oulu Cosmic-Ray Station		Oulu, Finland
Owens Valley Radio Observatory	1958	Bishop, California, US
Pachmarhi Array of Cerenkov Telescopes (PACT)	1986	Pachmarhi, Madhya Pradesh, India
Palisades-Dows Observatory	1987	Cedar Rapids, Iowa, US
PAGASA Astronomical Observatory	1954	Quezon City, Philippines
Palermo Observatory	1790	Palermo, Sicily, Italy
Palomar Observatory	1948	Palomar Mountain, California, US
Panzano Observatory	1640	Bologna, Italy
Paranal Observatory	1999	Cerro Paranal, Atacama Desert, Chile
Paris Observatory	1667	Paris, France
Parkes Observatory	1961	Parkes, Australia
Paul Robinson Observatory	1965	High Bridge, New Jersey, US
Peach Mountain Observatory	1950	Dexter, Michigan, US
Penteli Observatory	1937	Penteli, Attica, Greece
Perkins Observatory	1931	Delaware, Ohio, US
Perth Observatory	1896	Perth, Australia
Peterberg Observatory	1977	Saarland, Germany
Pic du Midi Observatory	1878	Pic du Midi, Pyrenees, France
Pico dos Dias Observatory	1981	Minas Gerais, Brazil
Piera Observatory	1968	Barcelona, Spain
Pierre Auger Observatory	2004	Malargüe, Argentina
Pine Bluff Observatory	1958	Cross Plains, Wisconsin, US
Pine Mountain Observatory	1965	Bend, Oregon, US
Pistoia Mountains Astronomical Observatory	1990	Pian dei Termini (near San Marcello Pistoiese), Italy
Piwnice Ovservatory	1945	Piwnice near Toruń, Poland
Planetarium and Astronomical Observatory in Grudziądz	1972	Grudziądz, Kujawsko-Pomorskie, Poland
Plateau Astronomique de La Couronne	2024	Cordes-sur-Ciel, Tarn, France
Pollock Astronomical Observatory	2004	Hunting Valley, Ohio, US
Portage Lake Observatory (defunct)	1948	Dexter, Michigan, US
Poznań Observatory	1919	Poznań, Poland
Prishtina Observatory	1997	Pristina Municipality, Kosovo
PROBA-3	2024	Low Earth orbit
Puckett Observatory	1977	Ellijay, Georgia, US
Pula Observatory	1869	Pula, Croatia
Pulkovo Observatory	1839	Pulkovskiye Heights, Russia
Purple Mountain Observatory	1929	Nanjing, Jiangsu Province, China
Queqiao	2018	Earth-Moon L_{2}
Queqiao-2	2024	Lunar orbit
Quito Astronomical Observatory	1873	La Alameda Park, Quito, Ecuador
Radcliffe Observatory	1772	Oxford, England. Moved to Durban, South Africa in 1939
Rainbow Park Observatory	2013	Rio Rancho, New Mexico, US
Rainwater Observatory		French Camp, Mississippi, US
Ralph A. Worley Observatory	1964	Shreveport, Louisiana, US
Rankin Science Observatory	1963	Appalachian State University, Boone, North Carolina, US
Rancho Mirage Library and Observatory	2018	Rancho Mirage, California, US
Rattlesnake Mountain Observatory (defunct)	1971	Hanford Reach National Monument, Washington, US
Real Instituto y Observatorio de la Armada (Spain)	1793	San Fernando, Spain
Red Barn Observatory	2006	Ty Ty, Georgia, US
Red Buttes Observatory	1994	Laramie, Wyoming, US
Reedy Creek Observatory	1997	Reedy Creek, Queensland
Riley Observatory	1974	Naperville, Illinois, US
RIT Observatory		Rochester, New York, US
Ritter Observatory		Toledo, Ohio, US
Robert A. Schommer Observatory		Rutgers University, New Brunswick, New Jersey, US
Robert Brownlee Observatory		Lake Arrowhead, California, US
Robinson Observatory		Orlando, Florida, US
Robotic Lunar Observatory (defunct)	1995	Flagstaff, Arizona, US
Roger Twitchell Observatory	1972	Paris, Maine, US
Rogers Observatory	1981	Traverse City, Michigan, US
Rolnick Observatory		Westport, Connecticut, US
Rome Observatory	1938	Italy
Roseland Observatory	1998	St Stephen-in-Brannel, UK
Rossall School Observatory		Rossall, UK
Rothney Astrophysical Observatory	1984	Priddis, Alberta, Canada
Royal Observatory, Greenwich	1675	Greenwich, England, UK
Royal Observatory, Edinburgh	1896	Edinburgh, Scotland, UK
Roque de los Muchachos Observatory	1979 (officially inaugurated in 1985)	La Palma, Canary Islands, Spain
Rosemary Hill Observatory		Bronson, Florida, US
Rozhen Observatory	1981	Peak Rozhen, Bulgaria
Rutherford Observatory	1920s	New York City, New York, US
San Fernando Observatory (SFO)	1976	Sylmar, California, US
Sankt Andreasberg Observatory	2014	Sankt Andreasberg, Germany
Sayan Spectrographic Cosmic Ray Complex		Irkutsk, Russia
SFA Observatory	1976	Nacogdoches, Texas, US
Sagamore Hill Radio Observatory	1963	Hamilton, Massachusetts, US
Schoonover Observatory	1964	Lima, Ohio, US
Shattuck Observatory	1854	Hanover, New Hampshire, US
Sherwood Observatory	1972	Mansfield, UK
Seven Hills Observatory	1996	Kearney, Nebraska, US
Shamakhi Astrophysical Observatory	1958	Shamakhi, Azerbaijan
Shanghai Astronomical Observatory	1962	Shanghai, China
Sherzer Observatory	1878	Ypsilanti, Michigan, US
Sheshan Astronomical Observatory	1900	Shanghai, China
Siding Spring Observatory	1924	Siding Spring, New South Wales, Australia
Sidmouth Observatory	1912	Sidmouth, Devon, England, UK
Sierra Nevada Observatory	1981	Sierra Nevada, Spain
Silesian Planetarium and Astronomical Observatory	1955	Chorzów / Katowice, Silesia, Poland
Simeiz Observatory	1906	Simeiz, Crimea, Ukraine
Skalnaté Pleso Observatory	1953	Vysoké Tatry, Slovakia
Skinakas Observatory	1984	Crete, Greece
Skylab	1973	Low Earth orbit; re-entered in 1979
Smith Observatory	1880s	Beloit, Wisconsin, US
Smithsonian Astrophysical Observatory	1890	Cambridge, Massachusetts, US
Snow King Observatory and Planetarium	2024	Jackson, Wyoming, US
Sobaeksan Optical Astronomy Observatory	1978	Sobaeksan, South Korea
Sola Fide Observatory	1990s	Austin, Minnesota, US
Solar and Heliospheric Observatory (SOHO)	1996	Earth–Sun L1 point
Solar Space Telescope	2009	709 km SSO; life: 3 years
Sommers–Bausch Observatory	1949	Boulder, Colorado, US
Sonnenborgh Observatory	1853	Utrecht, Netherlands
Sonoma State Observatory	1976	Rohnert Park, California, US
South African Astronomical Observatory: Cape Town; Sutherland	1820; 1972	Observatory, Cape Town, South Africa: Sutherland, Northern Cape, South Africa
Southern Astrophysical Research Telescope (SOAR)	2004	Cerro Pachón, Chile
South Pole Telescope	2007	Antarctica
Spanish National Observatory	1790	Madrid, Spain
Special Astrophysical Observatory of the Russian Academy of Sciences	1966	Zelenchukskaya, near Arkhyz, Caucasus Mountains, Russia
Sperry Observatory	1967	Cranford, New Jersey, US
SPHEREx	2025	Sun-synchronous Earth orbit
Spitzer Space Telescope	2003	Heliocentric orbit
Springfield Observatory	1968	Springfield, Massachusetts, US
Sproul Observatory	1911	Swarthmore, Pennsylvania, US
Stardome Observatory	1967	Auckland, North Island, New Zealand
Starkenburg Observatory	1970	Heppenheim, Germany
Štefánik's Observatory	1928	Prague, Czech Republic
Stellafane Observatory	1920	Springfield, Vermont, US
Stellar Vista Observatory	2019	Kanab, Utah, US
Stephens Memorial Observatory	1901	Hiram, Ohio, US
Steward Observatory: MMT Observatory; Mount Graham International Observatory; Mount Lemmon Observatory	1916	Tucson, Arizona, US
Stickney Observatory	1950s	Bennington, Vermont, US
Stjärneborg	1581	Ven, Sweden
Stockholm Observatory	1749	Stockholm, Sweden
Stokesville Observatory	1970s	Virginia, US
Stone Observatory	1853	Stone, Buckinghamshire, UK
Stonyhurst Observatory	1838	Lancashire, England
Strasbourg Observatory	1881	Strasbourg, France
Stratospheric Observatory for Infrared Astronomy	2006	14 km in Earth stratosphere
Stull Observatory	1966	Alfred, New York, US
Stuttgart Observatory	1920	Stuttgart, Germany
Submillimeter Array	1987	Mauna Kea, Hawaii, US
St. Thomas Observatory	2009	Saint Paul, Minnesota, US
Space Variable Objects Monitor	2004	Low Earth orbit
Sudbury Neutrino Observatory	1999	Sudbury, Ontario, Canada
Sunriver Observatory	1990	Sunriver, Oregon, US
Swift Gamma-Ray Burst Mission	2004	Low Earth orbit
Swiss Observatory Polychron and Astronomy	2019	Geneva, Switzerland
Sydney Observatory	1858	Sydney, Australia
Table Mountain Observatory		Angeles National Forest, Wrightwood, California, US
Tacubaya Observatory	1882	Tacubaya, Mexico City, Mexico
Taeduk Radio Astronomy Observatory	1986	Taejon, South Korea
Tamke-Allan Observatory	1998	Roane County, Tennessee, US
Tartu Observatory	1964	Tõravere, Tartumaa, Estonia
Tartu Old Observatory (Dorpat or Jurjev Observatory)	1810	Tartu, Estonia
Teide Observatory	1964	Tenerife, Canary Islands, Spain
Ten Acre Observatory		Tribbey, Oklahoma, US
Terskol Peak Observatory	1989	Terskol, Kabardino-Balkaria, Russia
Thai National Observatory	2013	Doi Inthanon, Chiang Mai, Thailand
The Dam Observatory	2017	Lake Tschida, North Dakota, US
The Heights Observatory	1989	The Heights School, South Australia
Texas A&M Astronomical Observatory		College Station, Texas, US
Theodore Jacobsen Observatory	1895	Seattle, Washington, US
Thompson Observatory	1968	Beloit, Wisconsin, US
Tien Shan Astronomical Observatory		Almaty, Kazakhstan
Tuorla Observatory	1952	Piikkiö, Finland
Trieste Observatory		Trieste, Italy
Troodos Observatory	2023	Agridia, Troodos Mountains, Cyprus
Trottier Observatory	2015	Simon Fraser University, Burnaby, Canada
Turin Observatory	1759	Pino Torinese, Italy
Udaipur Solar Observatory		Udaipur, Rajasthan, India
Ukrainian T-shaped Radio telescope, second modification	1972	Shevchenkove, Ukraine
Ulugh Beg Observatory	1420s	Samarkand, Uzbekistan
University of Alabama Observatory	1950	Tuscaloosa, Alabama, US
University of Alabama Observatory (Old)	1849–1890s	Tuscaloosa, Alabama, US
University of North Alabama Observatory		Florence, Alabama, US
University of Illinois Astronomical Observatory	1896	Urbana, Illinois, US
University of London Observatory	1929	London, England, UK
University of Maryland Observatory		College Park, Maryland, US
University of Michigan-Dearborn Observatory	2007	Dearborn, Michigan, US
University of New Hampshire Observatory	1985	Durham, New Hampshire, US
University of Oklahoma Observatory		Norman, Oklahoma, US
University of Puerto Rico at Humacao Observatory	1985	Humacao, Puerto Rico, US
Astronomical Observatory of the University of Valencia	1909	Valencia, Spain
Uppsala Astronomical Observatory	1741	Uppsala, Sweden
Urania (Antwerp)		Hove, Belgium
Urania (Berlin)		Berlin, Germany
Urania (Vienna)	1909	Vienna, Austria
Urania Observatory (Zürich)	1907	Zürich, Switzerland
Uraniborg	1572–1597 (demolished)	Ven, Sweden
Urumqi Astronomical Observatory	1957	Urumqi, Xinjiang, China
U.S. Naval Observatory (USNO): Depot of Charts and Instruments (U.S. Navy) (precursor, renamed to USNO); U.S. Naval Observatory (Flagstaff Station)	1844: 1830–1844; 1955	Washington, D.C., US: Washington, D.C., US; Flagstaff, Arizona, US
Valongo Observatory	1881	Rio de Janeiro, Brazil
Vainu Bappu Observatory	1968	Kavalur, Tamil Nadu, India
Astronomical observatory of Aosta Valley	2003	Nus, Aosta Valley, Italy
Van Vleck Observatory	1914	Middletown, Connecticut, US
Vanderbilt University Observatory		Nashville, Tennessee, US
Vartiovuori Observatory (defunct)	1819–1834	Turku, Finland
Vassar College Observatory (defunct)	1865	Poughkeepsie, New York, US
Vatican Observatory: Vatican Advanced Technology Telescope	1891: 1993	Headquarters: Castel Gandolfo, Italy: Mount Graham, Arizona, US
Veen Observatory	1970	Lowell, Michigan, US
Vega–Bray Observatory	1990	Benson, Arizona, US
Ventspils Starptautiskais Radioastronomijas Centrs		Irbene, Latvia
Vera C. Rubin Observatory	2025	Cerro Pachón, Chile
Vernonia Peak Observatory		Vernonia, Oregon, US
Very Large Array	1980	Socorro, New Mexico, US
Very Long Baseline Array	1993	Various locations on Earth
Vienna Observatory	1753	Vienna, Austria
Vilnius University Observatory	1753	Vilnius University, Lithuania
Višnjan Observatory	1978	Višnjan, Croatia
Vsetín Observatory	1950	Vsetín, Czech Republic
Warkworth Radio Observatory	2008	Warkworth, New Zealand
Warner Observatory (defunct)	1882	Rochester, New York, US
Warner and Swasey Observatory	1919	Cleveland, Ohio, US
Warren Rupp Observatory	1985	Mansfield, Ohio, US
University of Warsaw Observatory	1825	Warsaw, Poland
Washburn Observatory	1881	Madison, Wisconsin, US
Wast Hills Observatory	1982	Birmingham, England, UK
Weaver Student Observatory	1998	Monterey, California, US
Weitkamp Observatory	1955	Westerville, Ohio, US
West Mountain Observatory	1981	West Mountain, Utah, US
Whakatane Astronomical Society	1964	Whakatāne, New Zealand
Whitin Observatory	1901	Wellesley, Massachusetts, US
Widener University Observatory	2004	Chester, Pennsylvania, US
Wilder Observatory	1903	Amherst, Massachusetts, US
Willard L. Eccles Observatory	2009	Frisco Peak, Utah, US
William Brydone Jack Observatory	1851	Fredericton, New Brunswick, Canada
Williams Observatory	1990	Boiling Springs, North Carolina, US
Winer Observatory	1983	Sonoita, Arizona, US
Winfree Observatory	1900	Lynchburg, Virginia, US
Wise Observatory	1971	Negev, Israel
Witte Observatory	1984	Mediapolis, Iowa, US
WIYN Observatory	1994	Kitt Peak, Arizona, US
Wyoming Infrared Observatory	1975	Laramie, Wyoming, US
Xiangfen Astronomical Observatory	2100 BCE	Xiangfen County, Linfen, Shanxi Province, China
Xinglong Station (NAOC)		Xinglong County, Chengde, Hebei province, China
Xinjiang Astronomical Observatory	1968	Urumqi, Xinjiang, China
XMM-Newton	1999	Highly eccentric Earth orbit
XRISM	2023	Earth orbit
XPoSat	2024	Earth orbit
Xujiahui Astronomical Observatory	1872	Shanghai, China
Arctic Space Weather Center		Yakutsk, Russia
Yale Student Observatory		New Haven, Connecticut, US
Yangbajing International Cosmic-Ray Observatory		Yangbajing Valley, Tibet, China
Yantra Mandir	1724	New Delhi, Delhi, India
Yerevan Cosmic-Ray Station		Yerevan, Armenia
Yerkes Observatory	1897	Williams Bay, Wisconsin, US
York University Observatory	1969	Toronto, Ontario, Canada
Yuba City Astronomical Observatory	2010	Yuba City, California, US
Yunnan Astronomical Observatory	1957	Kunming, Yunnan, China
Zimmerwald Observatory	1956	Zimmerwald, Switzerland
Zadko Observatory	2009	Gingin, Australia

== See also ==
- Lists of telescopes
- Category:Astronomical observatories by country
- History of the telescope
- List of astronomical instrument makers
- List of highest astronomical observatories
- List of largest optical reflecting telescopes
- List of largest optical refracting telescopes
- List of observatory codes
- List of planetariums
- List of radio telescopes
- List of telescope types
- Science tourism
- Space observatory
- Timeline of telescopes, observatories, and observing technology
