= VPO =

VPO can stand for:

- Vice President of Operations
- Vapor pressure osmometry
- Vernonia Peak Observatory
- Vienna Philharmonic Orchestra
- Village Police Officer, not to be confused with Village Public Safety Officer (VPSO)
- Victim Protection Order
- Village Post Office in India
- Virtual Pipe Organ
