= Thomas J. Balonek =

American astronomer

Minor planets discovered: 9
| 6452 Johneuller | 17 April 1991 | list |
| (9613) 1993 BN_{3} | 26 January 1993 | list |
| (14462) 1993 GA | 2 April 1993 | list |
| (48496) 1993 BM_{3} | 26 January 1993 | list |
| (52463) 1995 GA_{8} | 6 April 1995 | list |
| (85323) 1995 GF_{8} | 8 April 1995 | list |
| (100307) 1995 GJ_{8} | 8 April 1995 | list |
| (162023) 1995 GP_{8} | 8 April 1995 | list |
| (347162) 2011 FN_{12} | 8 April 1995 | list |

Thomas J. Balonek is a professor of physics and astronomy at Colgate University. He studies optical and radio emissions from galactic centers and quasars, and is a multiple discoverer of minor planets.

He is credited by the Minor Planet Center with the discovery of 9 minor planets made at Kitt Peak and Foggy Bottom Observatory during 1991–1995, respectively. His first discovery was the main-belt asteroid 6452 Johneuller in 1991.

His favorite sports are hockey and lacrosse, although he plays neither of them. He is also color blind and is outspoken about his condition.
