= Grant O. Gale Observatory =

Observatory in Iowa, US

- Organization: Grinnell College Department of Physics
- Location: Grinnell, Iowa
- Coordinates: 41°45′20.2″N 92°43′11.5″W
- Website: www.grinnell.edu/aboutinfo/map/obs/

Telescopes
- Unnamed Telescope: 24 inch reflector

Grant O. Gale Observatory is an astronomical observatory owned and operated by Grinnell College Department of Physics. The observatory is located in Grinnell, Iowa (USA). Constructed in 1984, it is named after Grant O. Gale, a distinguished teacher and curator of the Grinnell Physics Historical Museum. Designed by Woodburn and O'Neil of Des Moines, the building is a 38-foot by 55-foot structure rising 26 feet to the top of the dome. It houses a 24-inch Cassegrain reflecting telescope built by DFM Engineering of Longmont, Colorado. The observatory houses two computer systems: the first controls the telescope and the second accommodates data acquisition and analysis and can be used to store television images. In addition to its primary function as an instructional and research tool, the observatory is also a facility for public viewing of astronomical phenomena under staff supervision.

== See also ==
- List of astronomical observatories
