= University of North Alabama Planetarium and Observatory =

UNA Observatory
- Organization: University of North Alabama
- Location: Florence, Alabama, United States
- Coordinates: 34°48′33.4″N 87°40′57″W
- Website: www.una.edu/planetarium/

Telescopes
- unnamed: Schmidt-Cassegrain 0.35 reflector

UNA Observatory is an astronomical observatory owned and operated by the University of North Alabama. It is located in Florence, Alabama (USA). It has 2 telescopes, a Celestron 0.35 m Schmidt–Cassegrain telescope. The UNA Planetarium is a 65-seat planetarium with a Spitz A3P projector and East Cost Control Systems controller.

== History ==
=== Construction ===
Construction of the UNA Planetarium and Observatory was done in two stages, with the observatory being constructed first. In 1964 what would eventually become University of North Alabama was then known as Florence State College. It was proposed that the College acquire an observatory and planetarium. At the time, the space race was well under way and investments were being made across the country in math and science.

The first stage of the project was construction of the observatory. The building was constructed and the dome hoisted into place on March 15, 1964. The event was the culmination of a four-year effort on the part of the local Florence Astronomy Club. The group wanted a telescope that would provide public views of the sky that was accessible and did not require driving long distances. Conversations with the college led to the project. Florence State College was interested in a planetarium and observatory and it was a natural alliance.

The show piece of the observatory was the 14.5 inch telescope that was to be the second largest telescope in the state. The mirror was ground by hand by members of the Astronomy club, who also constructed the telescope. On August 3, 1967 the telescope was placed into the dome after three years of labor by the amateur astronomers. The telescope weighed approximately a ton and was valued at $15000 in 1967.

The planetarium building was constructed alongside the telescope dome, providing access to both facilities. The planetarium projector was a Zeiss Laboratories model A3P, which was state of the art for that time.

=== Development ===
Under its first director, Mr. Henry Harvey the public would begin access to the facility that fall. Mr. Harvey would be director from 1967 to 1979.

After the term of Mr. Harvey ended, Dr. Dave Currot became planetarium-observatory director. He ran the planetarium from 1980 to 1999. The planetarium and observatory was then passed to the hands of the department chair, Dr. Tony Blose. Under his direction a new electronic control system manufactured by Northeast Control Systems was obtained to replace the original Zeiss controls. Dr. Blose served as planetarium-observatory director from 1999 to 2007. On January 7, 2008 Dr. Mel Blake was named Planetarium-Observatory director with a mandate to modernize and develop the programs. The recent investment in the control system along with release time by the university to run public outreach programs should allow the Planetarium and Observatory to serve the public and schools well into the future.

== Directors ==
- Dr. Henry Harvey (1967 - 1979)
- Dr. David Curott (1980 - 1999)
- Dr. Anthony Blose (1999 - 2007)
- Dr. Melvin Blake (2008 - )

== Telescopes ==
- 0.35 m Celestron Schmidt-Cassegrain (2008)
- Personal Solar telescope (2011)
- 60 mm Coronado solar telescope (2011)

== Instruments ==
- SBIG ST10 CCD camera
- Meade Deep Sky Imager
- Digital Video
- Spectrograph

== See also ==
- List of observatories
