= Howell Observatory =

Observatory in Mississippi, US

- Organization: Mississippi State University
- Location: Starkville, Mississippi
- Coordinates: Approx 33.464°N 88.819°W
- Altitude: 1,000 m (3,300 ft)
- Website: www.msstate.edu/dept/Physics/html/observatory.html

Telescopes
- Unnamed telescope: 14 inch Schmidt-Cassegrain reflector
- Unnamed telescope: 8 inch Schmidt-Cassegrain reflector
- Unnamed telescope: 10 inch Newtonian reflector

The Howell Observatory is an astronomical observatory owned and operated by Mississippi State University's Astronomy and Physics department. It is located in Starkville, Mississippi.

== Equipment ==
- 14" Schmidt-Cassegrain
- 8" Schmidt-Cassegrain
- 10" Newtonian reflector

== See also ==
- List of observatories
