= Orioloromano Observatory =

Orioloromano robotic observatory
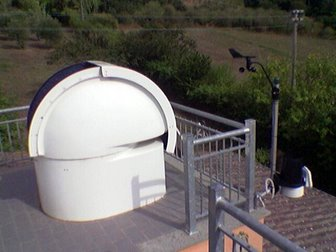
- Organization: amateur astronomical observatory
- Location: Oriolo Romano, Viterbo, Italy
- Coordinates: 42°10′10.3″N 12°8′16.8″E
- Altitude: 400 metres (1,300 ft)
- Website: https://sites.google.com/site/orioloromanoobservatory/orioloromano-robotic-observatory

Telescopes
- Celestron CPC 8: 20 cm Celestron CPC 8"
- Sky Watcher guide scope: 80 ed

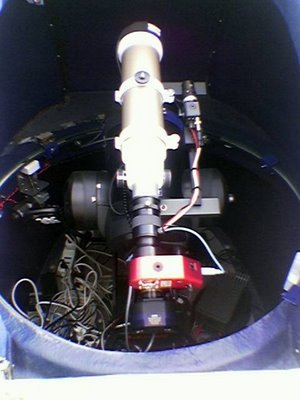
Observatory Dome Interior.

Oriolo Romano Observatory is an amateur astronomical observatory in Oriolo Romano, Viterbo, Italy. Built in 2007, the observatory has a Celestron 8" Schmidt-Cassegrain F/10 telescope. The observatory was designed to be fully robotic, uses a QSI WS40 CCD camera with clear filter for data acquisition. The observatory is only used for astronomical research and educational outreach. Website contains a guide to universities in the United States and in Italy specialized in physics, astrophysics and astronomy.

In addition to the "orioloromano observatory" being an astronomical observatory, it also functions as a local weather station with webcam always on line. The weather station's main purpose is to provide data for planning observing sessions by gathering information about the condition inside and outside the observatory. Conditions at the observatory are monitored and logged by a weather station. The station provides indoor and outdoor temperature as well as barometric pressure, humidity, rainfall, wind speed, direction and dew point. The data is reported real time, as well as logged. The station is configured to log and upload data to this website in 15-minute intervals. This data is also made available to forecasters, pilots, ships or anyone who needs it.

== See also ==
- List of astronomical observatories
