= Melton Memorial Observatory =

Astronomical observatory in South Carolina, United States

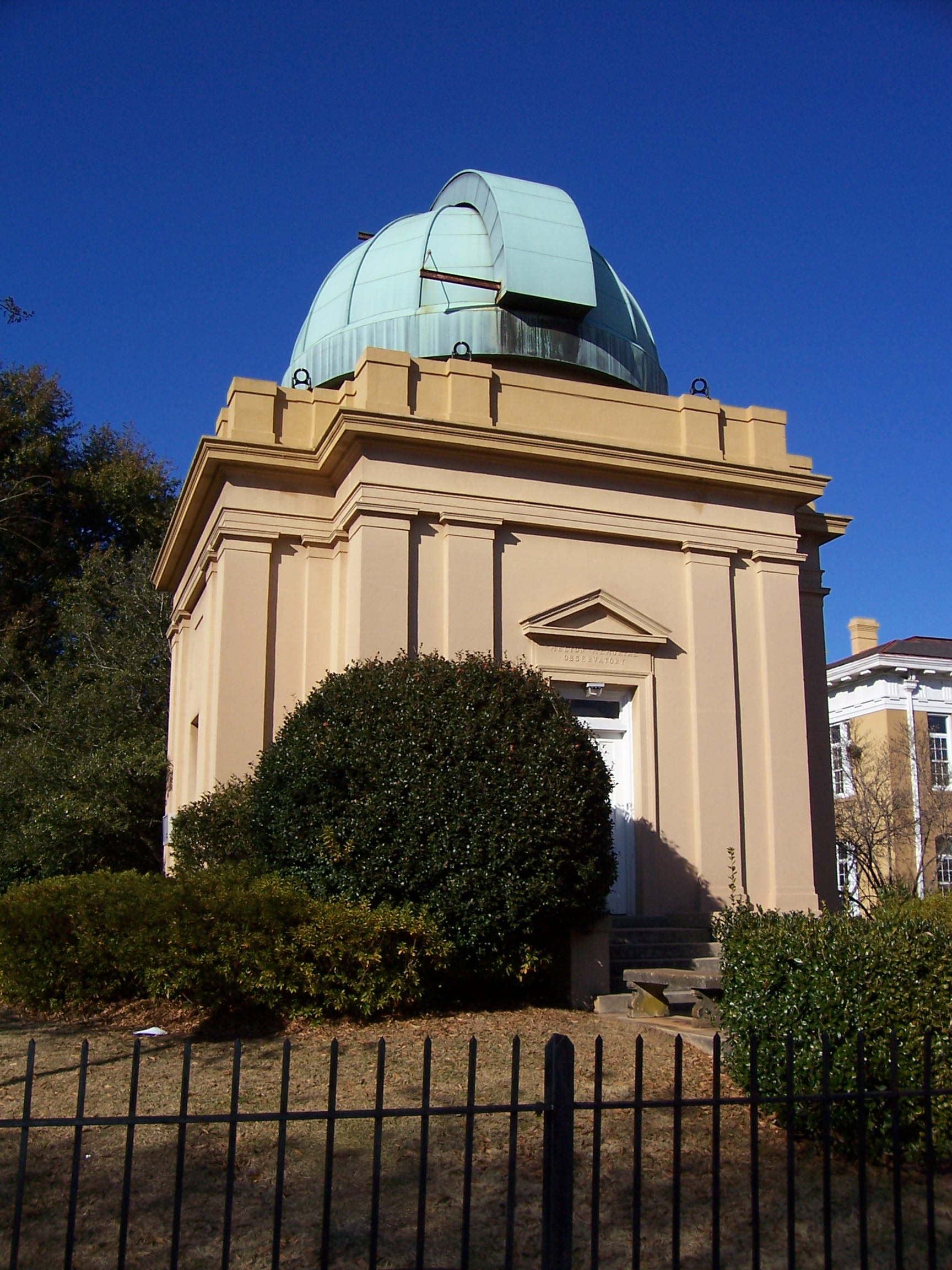
- Melton Memorial Observatory
- Organization: University of South Carolina
- Location: Columbia, South Carolina
- Coordinates: 33°59′51″N 81°01′35″W
- Established: 1928
- Website: http://boson.physics.sc.edu/~melton

Melton Memorial Observatory is an astronomical observatory owned and operated by University of South Carolina. It is named after William Davis Melton and built in 1928. It is located in Columbia, South Carolina (USA).

== See also ==
- List of observatories
