= Glen D. Riley Observatory =

Observatory in Illinois, US

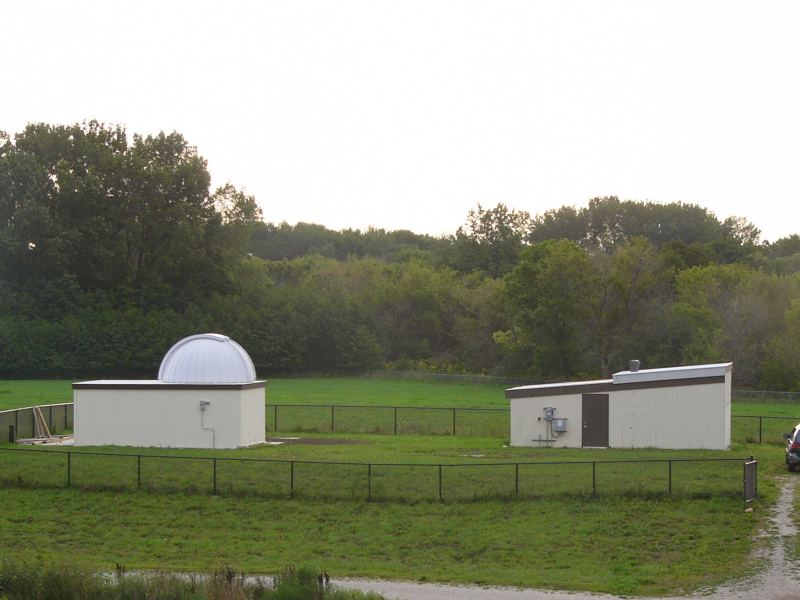
- Glen D. Riley and DuPage Valley Observatories
- Organization: Naperville Astronomical Association
- Location: Naperville, Illinois, US
- Coordinates: 41.7007°N 88.1588°W
- Altitude: 197 m (646 ft)
- Website: naperastro.org/about/observatories/

Telescopes
- "Abrahamian/Carhart" Telescope: 16 inch reflector

Glen D. Riley Observatory (GDRO) is an astronomical observatory owned and operated by Naperville Astronomical Association. It was founded 1973 and located in Naperville, Illinois (US). Partnered with the DuPage Valley Observatory (DVO), which is equipped with a custom 12.5" astrograph for video imaging; together, they make up the association's "Astronomy Education Center". The facility is used both by the organization's members and for extensive public outreach.

Inside the GDRO is a 16" (406 mm) Newtonian telescope with a 4" secondary mirror and rotating head. The telescope is attached to an equational mount to compensate for the earth's rotation. This mount rests on a hydraulic pier, able to raise the scope for easier viewing of targets closer to the horizon. The fully motorized mount can either be controlled with a hand controller or tablet to aim at targets in the sky.

The GDRO building uses a rotating dome and shutter for the telescope to view through. Adjacent to the room containing the telescope is a smaller heated anteroom for guests. This room features diagrams of the solar system and milky way, alongside a live view from the camera in the DVO when in operation. Guests may rest here once they are finished observing through the telescope, as well as obtain resources about astronomy they may wish to take home.

== See also ==
- List of astronomical observatories
