= Peterberg Observatory =

German observatory

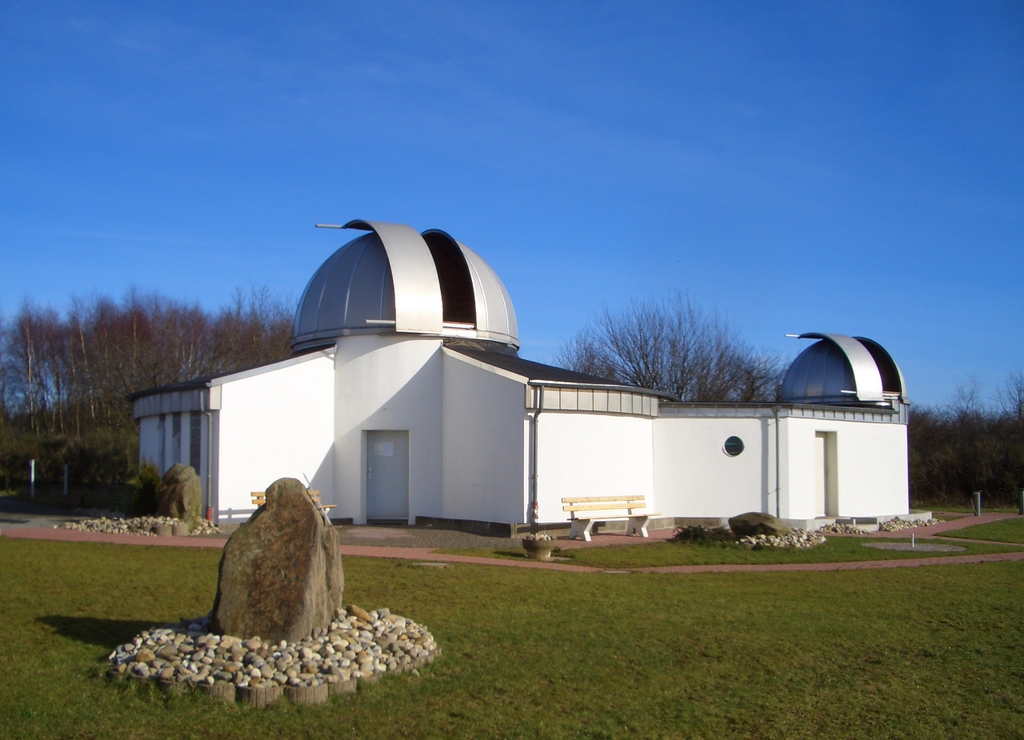
- Location: Nohfelden, Sankt Wendel, Saarland, Germany
- Coordinates: 49°34′17″N 6°59′57″E
- Altitude: 575.6 m (1,888 ft)
- Established: 1977
- Website: sternwarte-peterberg.de
- Location of Peterberg Observatory
- Related media on Commons

Sternwarte Peterberg is a club observatory in Saarland, Germany. Founded in 1977, it has 160 members as of 2016.

== See also ==
- List of astronomical observatories
