= North Georgia Astronomical Observatory =

Observatory in Georgia, US

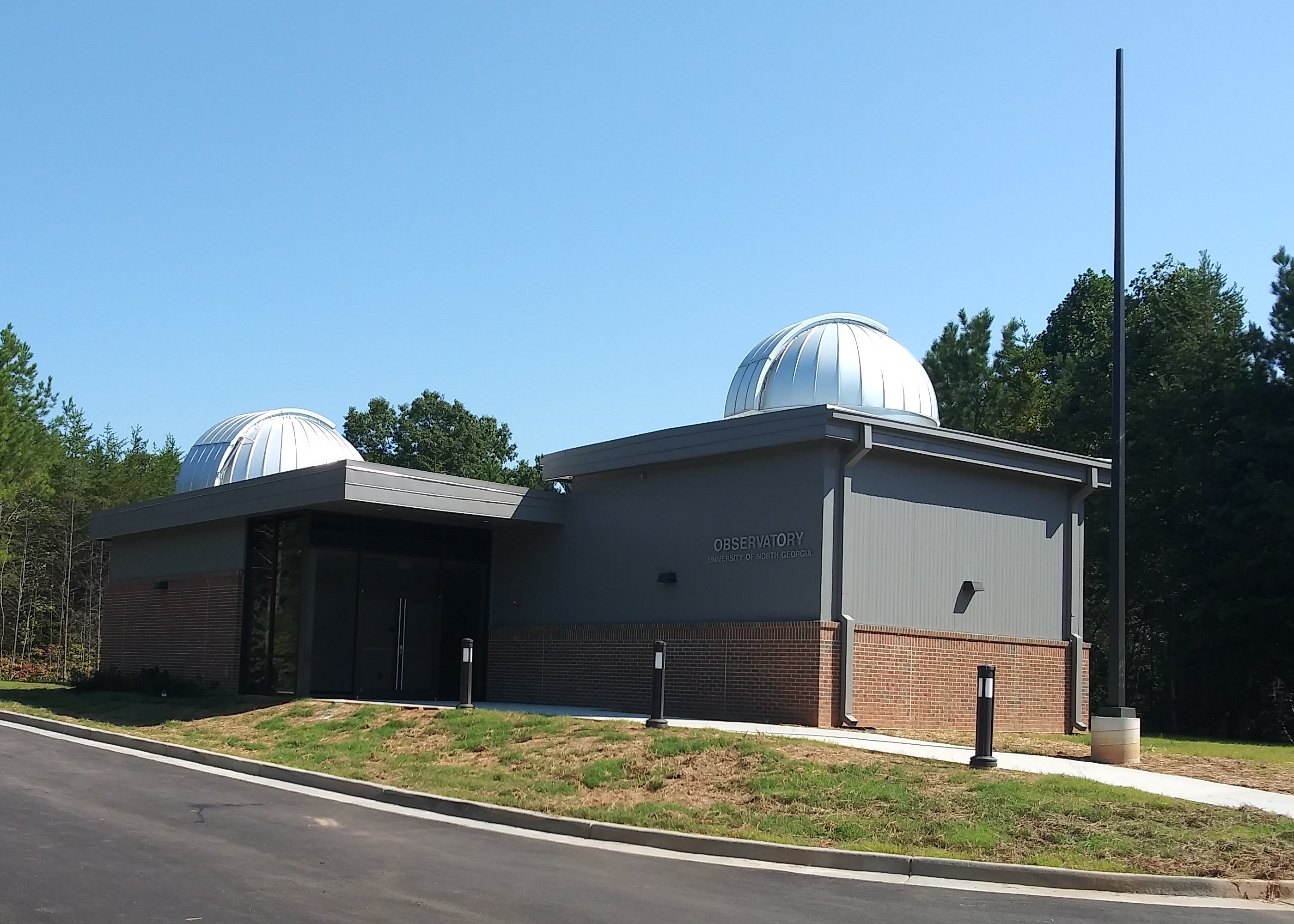
- North Georgia Astronomical Observatory in 2020
- Alternative names: UNG Observatory
- Organization: University of North Georgia
- Location: Dahlonega, Georgia
- Coordinates: 34°31′15″N 84°3′14″W
- Altitude: 420 m (1,380 ft)
- Weather: Clear Sky Chart
- Established: 1968
- Website: ung.edu/observatory/

Telescopes
- Planewave CDK700: 0.7-m (28") CDK (Corrected Dall-Kirkham)
- Planewave CDK600: 0.6-m (24") CDK (Corrected Dall-Kirkham)
- Meade: 12" LX-850
- Orion: 8" SkyQuest

North Georgia Astronomical Observatory is an astronomical observatory owned and operated by University of North Georgia. It is located in Dahlonega, Georgia (USA).

== See also ==
- List of observatories
