= Mount Stony Brook Observatory =

Observatory in New York state, US

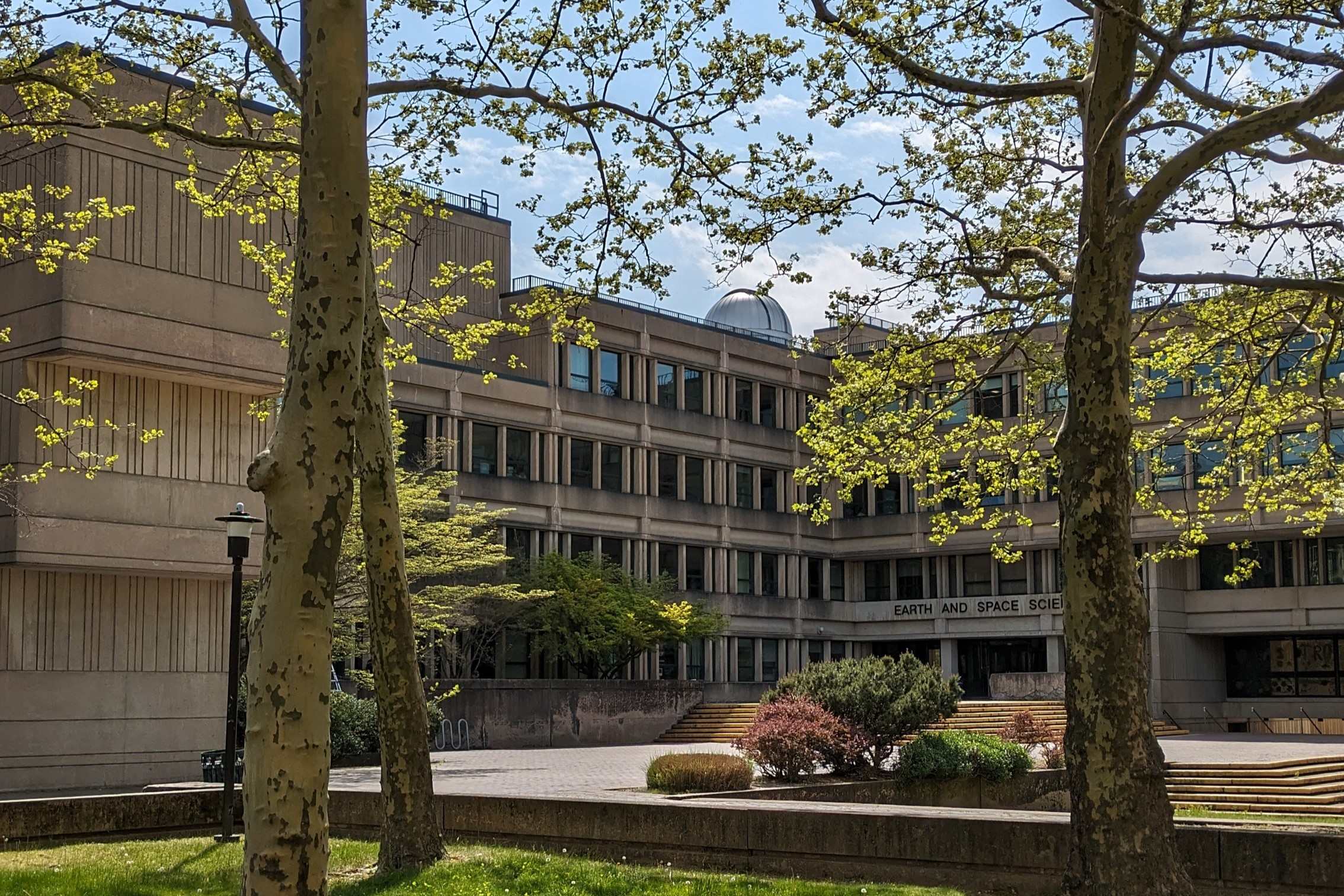
- Looking towards the observatory from the ground outside the Earth and Space Sciences building
- Organization: Stony Brook University
- Location: Stony Brook, New York (USA)
- Coordinates: 40.91476°N 73.12568°W

Telescopes
- Dome Telescope: 14" Schmidt–Cassegrain reflector

The Mount Stony Brook Observatory is an astronomical observatory operated by Stony Brook University in Stony Brook, within Suffolk County, New York, United States.

== Description ==
The observatory is located on the roof of the Earth and Space Sciences Building. The dome contains a Meade 14" Maksutov–Cassegrain telescope and SBIG (SBIG-STL1001e) imaging equipment. The telescope is used for teaching undergraduate and graduate astronomy labs by the department, as well as by the Astronomy club. The observatory's imaging capabilities have been used to monitor variable stars. On the first Friday of every month during the school year the department hosts "Astronomy Open Nights" during which a lecture is given, followed by observing if the weather permits. The observatory was built in 1968 and Astronomy Open Nights have been held there since 1976. The current telescope was installed in 1981.

== See also ==
- List of observatories
