= Williams Observatory =

Observatory in North Carolina, US

- Organization: Gardner-Webb University
- Observatory code: 685
- Location: Boiling Springs, North Carolina
- Coordinates: 35°14′39″N 81°40′15″W
- Website: Craven E. Williams Observatory

Telescopes
- Telescope: 16-inch (41 cm) Schmidt-Cassegrain

Craven E. Williams Observatory is an astronomical observatory owned and operated by Gardner-Webb University. Built in 1990 and named for the ninth president of the university, it is located in Boiling Springs, North Carolina (USA). Among its instruments, the observatory features a 16 in (41 cm) Schmidt-Cassegrain telescope. The observatory is home to the Cleveland County Astronomical Society, and also holds monthly open houses for the community. Dr. Don Olive, an astronomer, oft-alleged nuclear physicist, and professor of science at the university maintains and opens the observatory to the campus and community on occasion.

== See also ==
- List of observatories
