= Warren Rupp Observatory =

Observatory in Ohio, US

- Organization: Richland Astronomical Society
- Location: Mansfield, Richland County, Ohio
- Coordinates: 40°38′16″N 82°26′11″W
- Website: www.wro.org

Telescopes
- Big Blue: 36-inch (910 mm) Newtonian

Warren Rupp Observatory is an astronomical observatory owned and operated by Richland Astronomical Society. Built in 1985, it is located on the Friendly House Hidden Hollow Camp south of Mansfield, Ohio, United States.

The telescope is one of the world's largest amateur operated telescopes. It has public observing nights on the first Saturday of every month, weather permitting.

Warren Rupp Observatory holds public education and astronomy outreach programs regardless of weather conditions on all regularly scheduled public nights. Viewing through the 36-inch (910 mm) is only weather dependent and indoor facilities are available for programs. The Observatory is also the showpiece of the Hidden Hollow star party.

== History ==
The mirror blank for the 31-inch (790 mm) telescope was donated to the Lake Erie Astronomical Project by General Electric in 1968. The blank was originally intended for use McMath Solar Observatory on Kitt Peak, Arizona, which rejected the blank in favor of a larger mirror. Approximately 2,000 subsequent hours were spent grinding the mirror. The telescope saw first light in 1974.

The telescope was donated to the Richland Astronomical Society in 1982 provided there would be a building to house it. The project was primarily financed by member Warren Rupp, after whom the observatory is named, and construction was completed in 1985. The completed telescope weighed over 7,500 pounds, and was an f/6.8 Newtonian.

The original mirror was damaged in 2011 when the telescope's secondary mirror fell into the 31-inch (790 mm) primary and cracked it in half. The primary was promptly replaced with the current 36-inch (910 mm) f/6.3 mirror, the dimensions of which were selected to fit the existing dome and mount.

== See also ==
- List of observatories
