= Fox Park Public Observatory =

Observatory in Michigan, US

- Organization: Capital Area Astronomy Association, Lansing, Michigan
- Location: Fox Memorial Park, Potterville, Michigan, US
- Coordinates: 42.640136°N 84.747447°W
- Established: 1999

Telescopes
- Central telescope: 16 inch Meade Schmidt Cassegrain, pier mounted.
- East telescope: 12 inch Meade Schmidt Cassegrain
- West telescope: 12 inch Meade Schmidt Cassegrain

Fox Park Public Observatory is an astronomical observatory owned and operated by the Eaton County Parks Department and local amateur astronomers. Built in 1997 it is located in Fox Memorial Park near Potterville, Michigan (US).

== See also ==
- List of observatories
