= Miller Observatory =

Observatory in North Carolina, US

Lucile Miller Observatory
- Organization: Catawba Valley Astronomy Club
- Location: Maiden Middle School, Maiden, North Carolina, United States
- Coordinates: 35.57577°N 81.20614°W
- Website: www.catawbasky.org/lmo/

Lucile Miller Observatory is an astronomical observatory owned by Catawba County Schools and operated by the Catawba Valley Astronomy Club. It is located on the campus of Maiden Middle School in Maiden, North Carolina (USA), which is the former location of Maiden High School.

== See also ==
- Miller Observatory, LINCOLN NEBRASKA
- List of observatories
