= Weitkamp Observatory =

Observatory in Ohio, US

- Organization: Otterbein College
- Location: Ohio, United States
- Coordinates: 40°07′33″N 82°56′14″W

Telescopes
- Unnamed Telescope: Unknown size reflector

Weitkamp Observatory is an astronomical observatory owned and operated by Otterbein University. Donated in 1955 by Alfred Henry Weitkamp in memory of Mary Geeding Weitkamp, it is located in Westerville, Ohio (USA).

== See also ==
- List of observatories
