= Sola Fide Observatory =

Astronomical observatory in Minnesota, USA

- Organization: JC Hormel Nature Center
- Location: Near Austin, Minnesota
- Coordinates: 43.616675°N 92.975932°W
- Website: www.hormelnaturecenter.org/sola-fide-observatory.html

Telescopes
- unnamed: 18-inch reflector

The Sola Fide Observatory is an astronomical observatory owned and operated by staff and volunteers from JC Hormel Nature Center. It is located 3 miles south of Austin, Minnesota.

In 2019 the observatory added a 10-foot x 60-foot concrete observing strip with 120-volt AC power poles and 3 separate concrete observing pads (no power). The observatory's main scope is an 18" Starmaster fully-computerized Dobsonian telescope.

== See also ==
- List of astronomical observatories
