= Daniel Scholl Observatory =

Observatory in Pennsylvania, US

- Organization: Franklin and Marshall College
- Location: Lancaster, Pennsylvania (United States)
- Coordinates: 40.048068°N 76.320563°W
- Established: June 16, 1886

Telescopes
- Unnamed telescope: 11-inch Clark-Repsold refractor

Daniel Scholl Observatory was the astronomical observatory built by Franklin and Marshall College in Lancaster, Pennsylvania. Construction began in 1884 and the building was dedicated June 16, 1886. Total cost of the observatory and equipment was $13,579. The Observatory was named after Mr. Daniel Scholl of Maryland because his child donated the money for its establishment.

- Building cost- $3,000
- Steel Dome $2,000 by Grubb & Sons, Dublin, Ireland
- Equipment cost-$8,579 total
  - $4,199 for 11" Repsold Telescope (Hamburg, Germany)
  - $2,200 lens manufactured by Alvan Clark & Sons, Cambridge, Massachusetts
  - $2,180 for chronometer, chronograph, transit, clock and other equipment

Starting in 1889 it was one of the official Pennsylvania weather stations. In 1925 the observatory was moved 200 yards north to make way for a dormitory. The observatory was razed in 1966.

== Directors ==
- Jefferson E. Kershner

== Telescopes ==
The observatory contained an 11-inch Clark-Repsold refracting telescope.

== See also ==
- List of astronomical observatories
