= Celestial Observatory =

Observatory in Russellville, Arkansas, US

- Organization: Arkansas Tech University
- Location: Russellville, Arkansas (US)
- Coordinates: 35°17′43″N 93°8′11″W
- Altitude: 107 m (351 ft)
- Website: cosmos.atu.edu/observatory/

Telescopes
- Reflecting telescope: 16" reflector
- Meade Telescope: 12" reflector
- Celestron Telescope: 3 8" reflectors
- Celestron Telescope: 6" reflector
- Celestron Telescope: 4" reflector

Celestial Observatory is an astronomical observatory owned and operated by Arkansas Tech University. It is located in Russellville, Arkansas (US).

== See also ==
- List of observatories
