= Governor Aker Observatory =

Astronomical observatory

- Organization: Discovery Park
- Location: Safford, Arizona (US)
- Coordinates: 32.7993°N 109.72822°W
- Established: November 18, 1995

Telescopes
- Unnamed Telescope: 20 inch

Governor Aker Observatory is an astronomical observatory, part of Eastern Arizona College's Discovery Park Campus (formerly known as Discovery Park) in Safford, Arizona (US). Opening on November 18, 1995, the observatory became Discovery Park's first attraction. In addition to its telescope, a 20-inch Cassegrain reflector, it houses an astronomy exhibit gallery and a simulated voyage through the Solar System aboard a "space shuttle". Another of its attractions is a camera obscura, one of the world's largest. It also conducts tours of Mount Graham International Observatory.

== See also ==
- List of observatories
