= Capilla Peak Observatory =

Observatory in New Mexico, US

- Organization: University of New Mexico
- Location: Manzano, New Mexico
- Coordinates: 34°42′24″N 106°24′31″W
- Altitude: 2,835 meters (9,301 ft)

Telescopes
- unnamed telescope: 0.6 m reflector

Capilla Peak Observatory was an astronomical observatory built in 1947 and owned and operated by the University of New Mexico (UNM). It was located in the Manzano Mountains of central New Mexico (USA), approximately 30 mi (48 km) southeast of Albuquerque. It had a 0.6 m (24 in) Cassegrain reflecting telescope built by Boller and Chivens and was equipped with a CCD. The mirror was sold and removed in 2016.

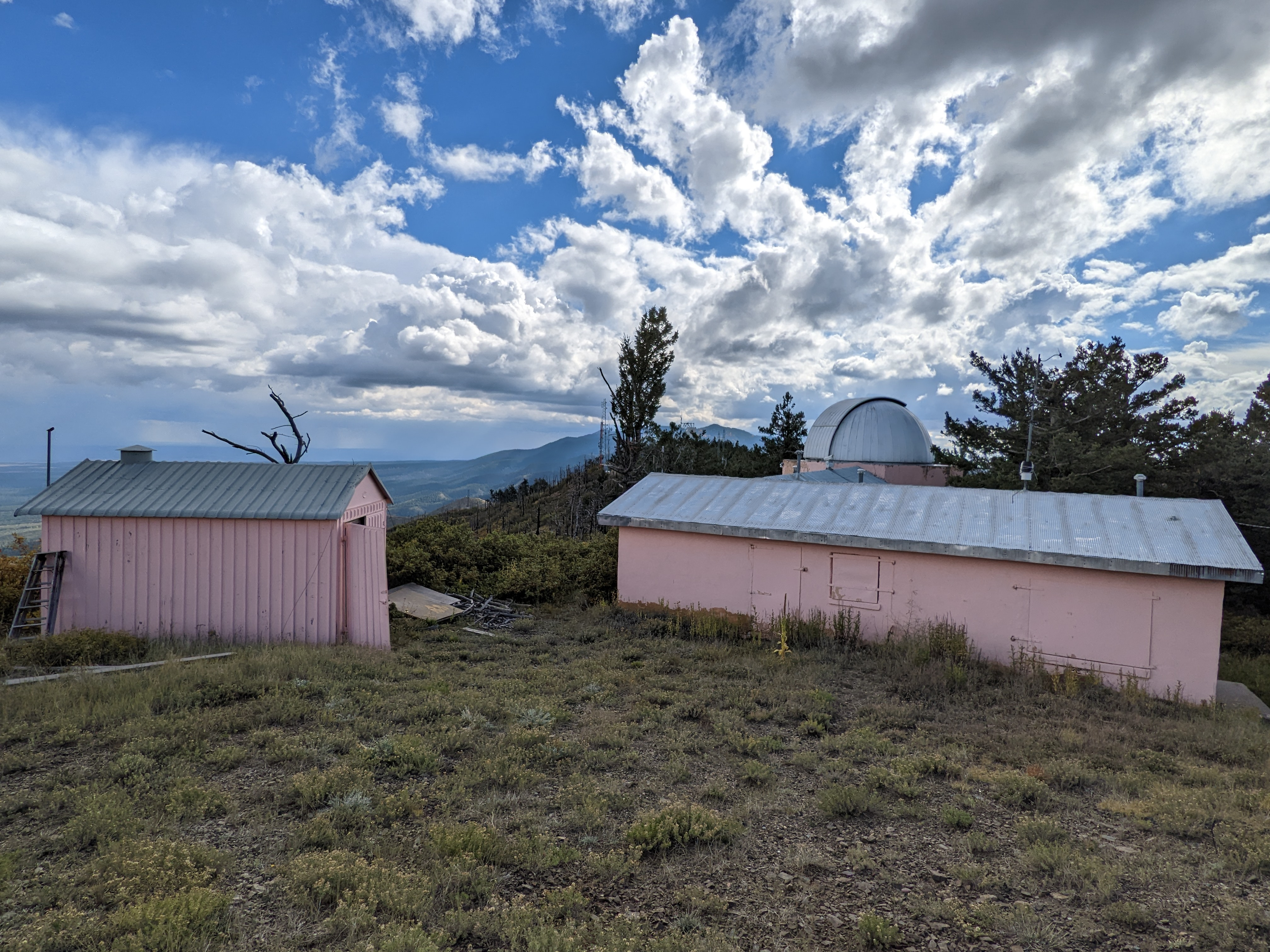
The abandoned Capilla Peak Observatory on 3 October 2022

== See also ==
- List of astronomical observatories
