= Observatory Vsetín =

Observatory in the Czech republic

Coordinates: 49°20′39.3″N 17°59′46.61″E

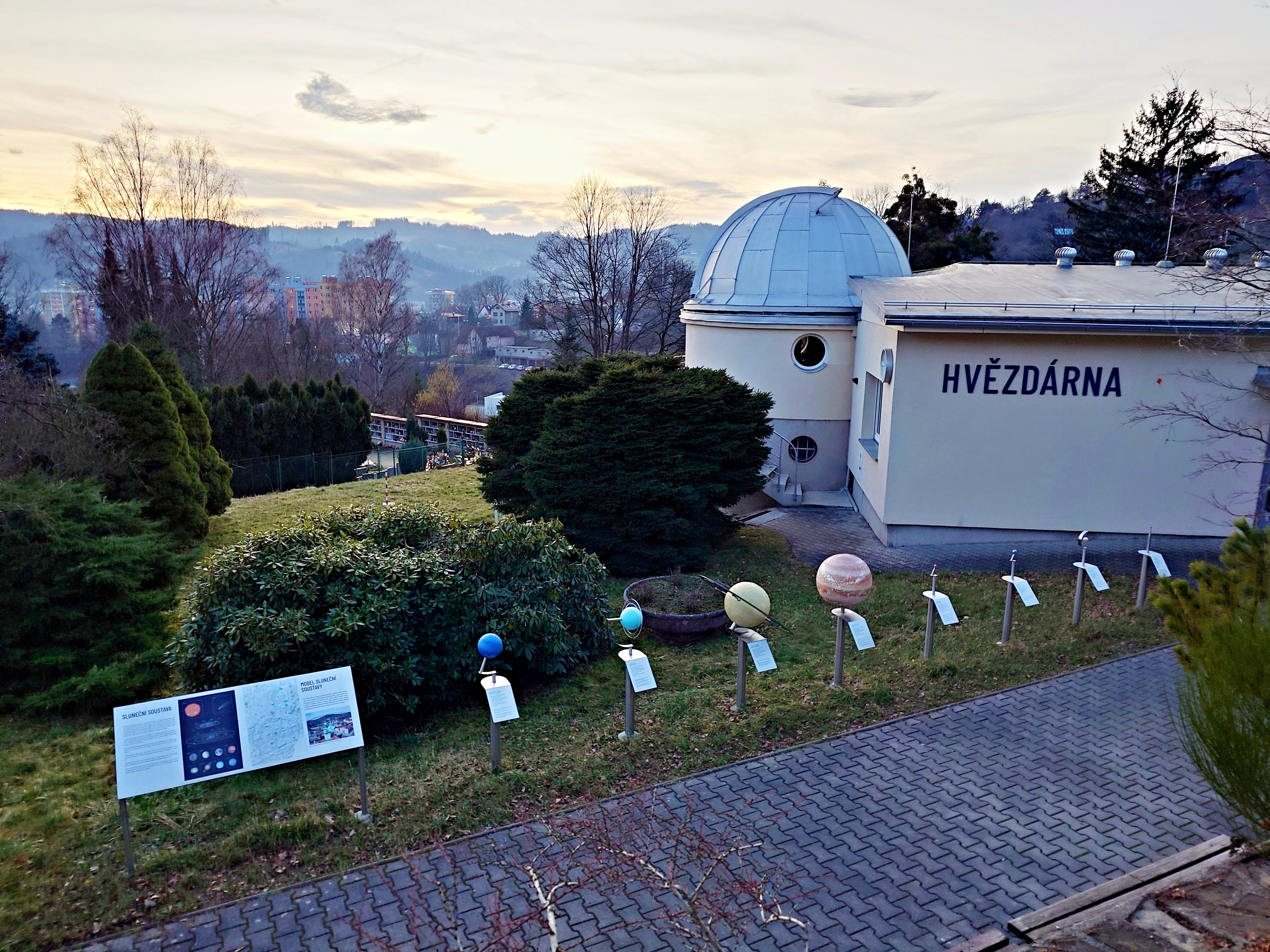
Observatory Vsetín in 2024

The Observatory Vsetín (Czech: Hvězdárna Vsetín) was founded in 1950 by the local branch of the Czechoslovak Astronomical Society.

== Scientific equipment ==
- Main telescope (Zeiss refractor, focal distance 3,000 mm, diameter 200 mm); includes equipment for observation of the Sun
- Guiding telescope (Zeiss refractor, focal distance 2,300 mm, diameter 120 mm)
- Viewfinder (diameter 90 mm, 3.2° field of view)
- BlackPearl (Newtonian reflector, focal distance 1,200 mm, diameter 150 mm); used for cometary photometry, retired in July 2008
- Newton (Newtonian reflector, focal distance 1,700 mm, diameter of primary mirror 300 mm); used for cometary photometry and occultation of stars
- CCD camera SBIG-ST7; used for cometary photometry, retired in 2012
- CCD camera G2-1600; replacement for SBIG-ST7, used for cometary photometry since 2012

== Scientific activities ==
- CCD photometry of comets
- Lightning detection
- Research of severe storms
- Bulletin ATHENA

== Directors ==
- Oldřich Křenek from July 1950 to January 1955
- Tomáš Skandera from January 1955 to May 1971
- Josef Blažek from May 1971 to January 1973
- Jiří Haas from January 1973 to unknown

== See also ==
- List of astronomical observatories
