= Bowman Observatory =

Observatory in Connecticut, US

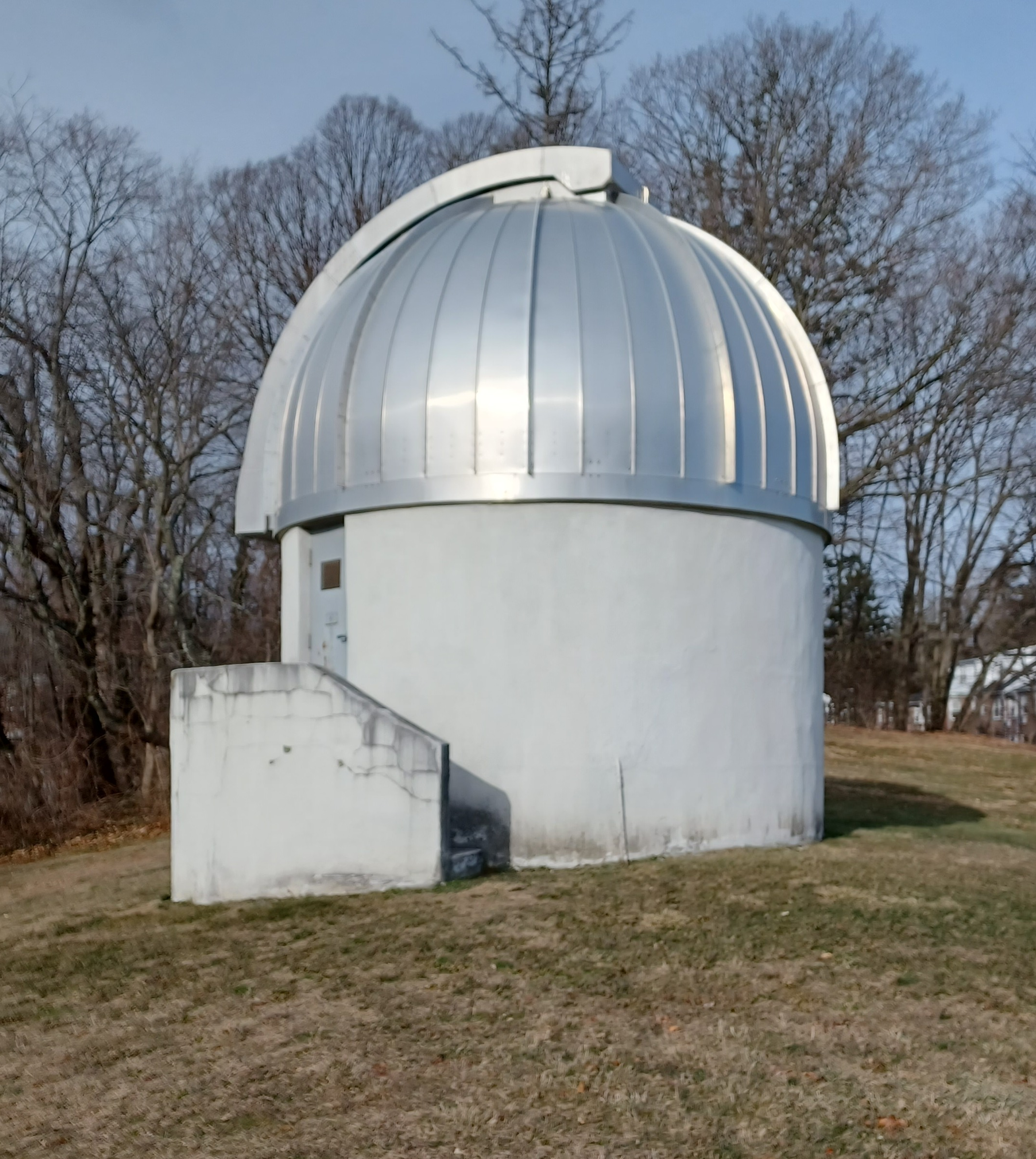
- Organization: Astronomical Society of Greenwich
- Location: Greenwich, Connecticut US
- Coordinates: 41°1′56.6″N 73°37′16″W
- Website: www.astrogreenwich.org

Telescopes
- RCOS Ritchey-Chretien telescope: 16 inches (40.64 cm)

Bowman Observatory is an astronomical observatory owned and operated by the Greenwich, Connecticut Board of Education.

Members of The Astronomical Society of Greenwich staff the observatory under the auspices of the Board's Continuing Education Department.

== History ==
Built in 1940 by Alden W. Smith, a science teacher at Greenwich High School, it is located on the grounds of the Julian Curtiss School, East Elm Street, Greenwich, Connecticut.

In the early 1980s, the Observatory fell into disrepair, and the original telescope was destroyed. The Astronomical Society of Greenwich was formed in 1984, in part to restore the Observatory so it could be used again as a teaching facility for Greenwich school students and the public. In 1986, the Observatory underwent a major renovation, including installation of a 12 1/2" Meade Newtonian telescope that was named in honor of Alden Smith. In 2007, the town of Greenwich agreed to spend $225,000 for a new dome. The original dome had been in place for more than 60 years, surviving storms, hurricanes, and nor'easters, and it had begun leaking, endangering the telescope. Birds had also been found nesting in it. On May 22, 2008, workers from Jackson, Mississippi-based Observa-Dome replaced the old dome with a new one, which weighs 4,000 pounds, is motorized, and can rotate 360 degrees.

In 2014, The Astronomical Society of Greenwich raised funding for and oversaw construction of a new pier and installation of an RCOS Carbon Truss 16-inch diameter Ritchey-Chretien F/8.4 telescope donated by a local resident.

== Facilities ==
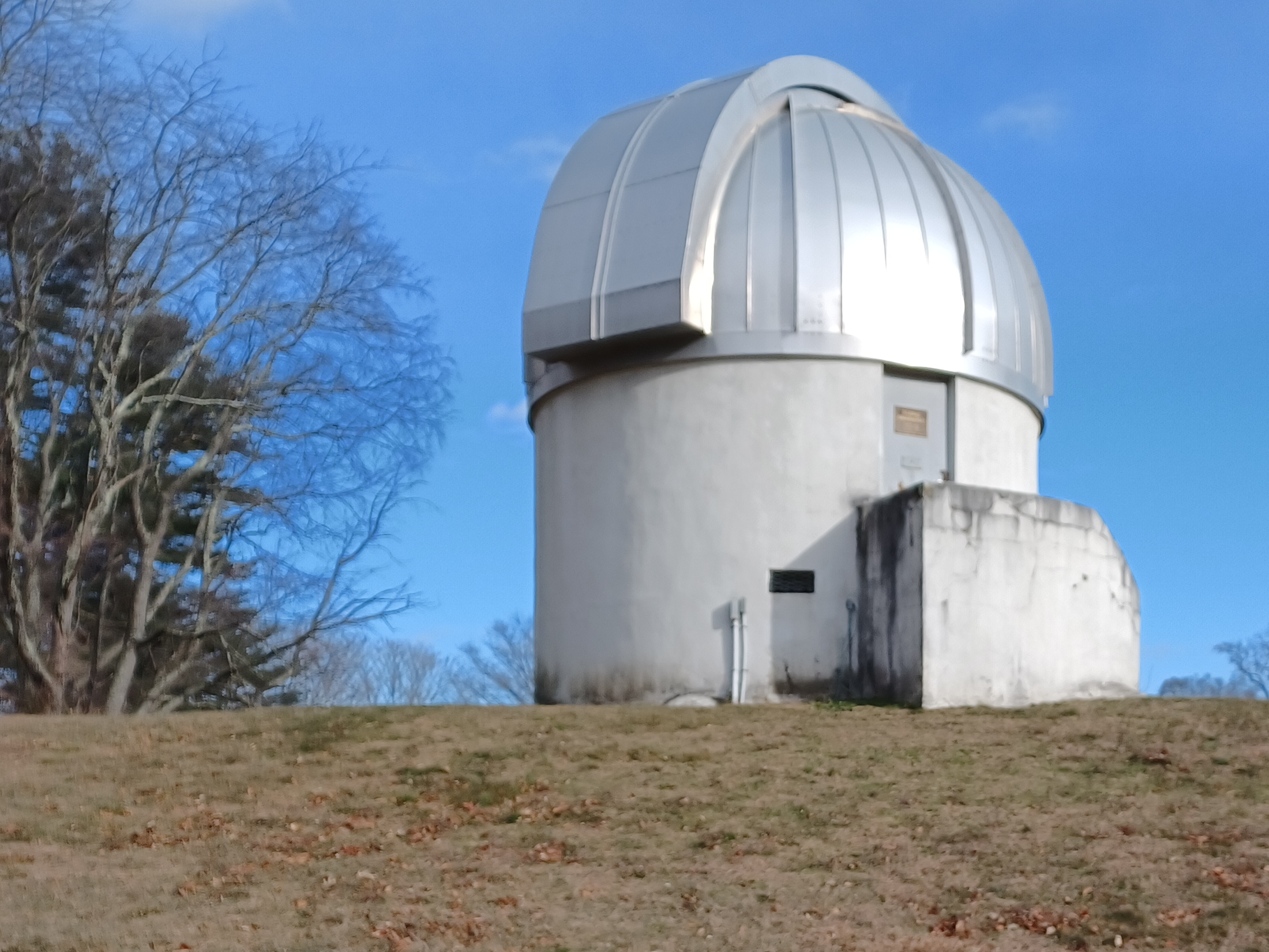
The observatory in 2022

The 12 1/2″ Meade telescope is refitted and used for special events and community outreach.

The Observatory is open to the public free of charge, on the first and third Wednesday evenings of every month, if skies are clear, and also for special celestial events. Spring and Fall: 8:00PM to 10:00PM; Summer 9:00PM to 11:00PM; Winter 7:00PM to 9:00PM. Also open by appointment for group visits.

== See also ==
- List of astronomical observatories
