= Mendenhall Observatory =

Observatory in Oklahoma, US

- Organization: Oklahoma State University - Stillwater
- Location: Stillwater, Oklahoma (USA)
- Coordinates: 36°4′13.7″N 97°11′37.8″W
- Website: www.physics.okstate.edu/observatory/

The H.S. Mendenhall Observatory is an astronomical observatory owned and operated by Oklahoma State University. Named after the university's first astronomer, Harrison Shepler Mendenhall, it is located in Stillwater, Oklahoma, United States.

== See also ==
- List of observatories
