= Herrett Observatory =

Observatory in Idaho, US

Centennial Observatory at the Herrett Center
- Organization: Herrett Center for Arts and Science, College of Southern Idaho
- Location: Twin Falls, Idaho, USA
- Coordinates: 42°35′02″N 114°28′13″W
- Altitude: 1,120 meters (3,670 feet)
- Website: herrett.csi.edu/astronomy/observatory/

Telescopes
- Norman Herrett Telescope: 24" (0.6m) f/8 Ritchey-Chrétien reflector

The Centennial Observatory at the Herrett Center for Arts and Science is a public astronomical observatory located at the College of Southern Idaho in Twin Falls, Idaho, United States. It opened on May 22, 2004, and features one of the world's largest fully wheelchair-accessible public telescopes.

== See also ==
- List of observatories
