= Mehalso Observatory =

Observatory in Pennsylvania, US

- Organization: Penn State Erie
- Location: Erie, Pennsylvania
- Coordinates: 42°7′6.3″N 79°59′15″W
- Website: Mehalso Observatory

Mehalso Observatory is an astronomical observatory owned and operated by Penn State Erie. A gift from Dr. Robert Mehalso and his wife, Elizabeth, it is located in Erie, Pennsylvania (USA).

== See also ==
- List of observatories
