= Oil Region Astronomical Observatory =

Observatory in Pennsylvania, US

- Organization: Oil Region Astronomical Society
- Location: Pennsylvania, United States
- Coordinates: 41°28′13″N 79°47′01″W
- Website: www.oras.org/obsphoto.htm

Telescopes
- Unnamed Telescope: Unknown size reflector

Oil Region Astronomical Observatory is an astronomical observatory owned and operated by Oil Region Astronomical Society. The Oil Region Astronomical Society was founded in 1993. It is located in Venango County, Pennsylvania (USA).

== History ==
The Oil Region Astronomical Society started as an idea in March 1991 when a small group of people with a passion for astronomy decided to unite throughout northwest Pennsylvania. These collected efforts led to the formation of the Venango County Astronomy Club, the predecessor of the Oil Region Astronomical Society. Within a short time, the group acquired a lease from Venango County for a parcel of land and began building the observatory. In 1993, the Oil Region Astronomical Observatory opened to the public and remained home to ORAS until January 2015 when the lease was terminated.

== See also ==
- List of astronomical observatories
