= Baker Observatory =

Astronomical observatory in Marshfield, Missouri, U.S.

- Organization: Missouri State University
- Location: Marshfield, Missouri
- Coordinates: 37°23′56″N 93°2′30″W
- Website: physics.missouristate.edu/bakerobservatory.htm

Telescopes
- Unnamed Telescope: 16" and 14" reflectors

The William G. and Retha Stone Baker Observatory is an astronomical observatory owned and operated by Missouri State University. It is located in Marshfield, Missouri.

== About the observatory ==
The William G and Retha Stone Baker Observatory is located ten miles northwest of Marshfield in Webster County (off Route 38 on Old Hillcrest Road). The Observatory houses a 14-inch (360 mm) Schmidt-Cassegrain and a 16-inch (410 mm) Cassegrain. The 16-inch Cassegrain Reflecting Telescope (with CCD attached camera) is on loan to MSU from Cerro Tololo Inter-American Observatory in Chile. This telescope was one of the first telescopes to be used at Kitt Peak National Observatory. In comparison to observations performed by eye, the CCD camera makes this telescope as powerful as a 100-inch (2,500 mm) telescope. Missouri State recently purchased an additional 16-inch Schmidt-Cassegrain reflector which is currently being set up to allow for remote operation from campus.

The Observatory is used on clear evenings for laboratory work by students in beginning and intermediate Astronomy courses, and by advanced undergraduate students and faculty conducting Astronomical research. The Observatory houses many smaller telescopes for students to use in addition to the two large instruments.

The public may visit the Observatory and view the night sky through telescopes, either at open houses or during the Ozarks Amateur Astronomers Club meetings. Open houses are conducted by the Department of Physics and Astronomy twice each year, in April or May, and in September or October. Admission is free.

== See also ==
- List of observatories
