= Francis Marion University Observatory =

Observatory in South Carolina, US

- Organization: Francis Marion University
- Location: Florence, South Carolina, US
- Coordinates: 34°11′6.4″N 79°39′6.4″W
- Established: 1982
- Website: astro.fmarion.edu/observe/

Francis Marion University Observatory is an astronomical observatory owned and operated by Francis Marion University. Built in 1982, it is located in Florence, South Carolina (US).

== See also ==
- List of observatories
