= Modine-Benstead Observatory =

Observatory in Wisconsin, US

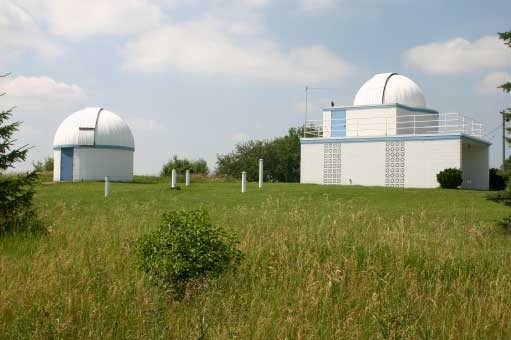
- Organization: Racine Astronomical Society
- Location: Union Grove, Wisconsin, US
- Coordinates: 42°43′44″N 88°01′42″W
- Established: October 1963
- Website: www.rasastro.org/observatory.htm

Telescopes
- 16-inch Newtonian/Cassegrain reflecting telescope: Mirror was figured at Kitt Peak
- 14-inch Schmidt–Cassegrain telescope: on a German equatorial mount
- Location within Wisconsin

The Modine-Benstead Observatory is an astronomical observatory in Union Grove, Wisconsin run by the Racine Astronomical Society. It opened in 1963 and has public viewing nights monthly during the summer and other events throughout the year for members.

The observatory is maintained through visitor donations to the Racine Astronomical Society, which is a 501(c)(3) non-profit organization.

The Modine-Benstead Observatory features two domed buildings that house one 16-inch Newtonian Cassegrain reflecting telescope and one 14-inch Schmitt Cassegrain reflecting telescope.

Unlike some more modern observatories, visitors are allowed to look through the telescopes directly rather than viewing the images through a computer.

== See also ==
- List of astronomical observatories
- List of planetariums
