= Mountain Skies Observatory =

Observatory in Wyoming, US

- Organization: privately owned
- Location: Lyman, Wyoming
- Coordinates: 41°19′40.8″N 110°17′31.2″W
- Altitude: 6,900 ft (2,103 m)

Telescopes
- unnamed: Classical Cassegrain Telescope 20-inch f/11.5

Mountain Skies Observatory is a privately owned astronomical observatory located in Lyman, Wyoming, USA. It is one of the largest observatories in the region and is used frequently by the Bridger Valley Astronomical Society.

== See also ==
- List of astronomical observatories
