= Bucknell Observatory =

Observatory in Pennsylvania, US

- Organization: Bucknell University
- Location: Lewisburg, Pennsylvania
- Coordinates: 40°57.079′N 76°52.993′W
- Altitude: 561 feet (171 m)
- Website: www.eg.bucknell.edu/physics/astronomy/observatory/

Telescopes
- Unnamed Telescope: 10.5 inch refractor

Bucknell Observatory is an astronomical observatory owned and operated by Bucknell University. It is located in Lewisburg, Pennsylvania.

== History ==
In 2019, the observatory offered classes in observational astrophysics taught by Katelyn Allers, associate professor of physics and astronomy at Bucknell who is a member of the team of astronomers credited with the discovery of the rogue planet PSO J318.5-22.

In 2018, the observatory offered the class, "Physics for Future Leaders," which was taught by professor of physics Brian Utter, and was designed to help future inventors and business managers ponder such questions as:

"Should we deregulate the oil industry or enact policies to favor a more sustainable energy of the future? Do our choices as individual consumers matter? Is it advisable — or even possible — to plan for a colony on Mars the way JFK boldly announced that 'we choose to go to the Moon?'"

== See also ==
- List of astronomical observatories
