= Winfree Observatory =

Observatory in Virginia, US

- Organization: Randolph College
- Location: Lynchburg, Virginia, United States
- Coordinates: 37°26′22.4″N 79°10′23.2″W
- Established: 1900

Winfree Observatory is an astronomical observatory owned and operated by Randolph College. Built in 1900 and named after Maj. C.V. Winfree, it is located in Lynchburg, Virginia (USA).

== See also ==
- List of observatories
