= Clarke Observatory =

Observatory in Ohio, US

Coordinates: 40.90390°N 81.10637°W

The Clarke Observatory is located on the University of Mount Union campus in Alliance, Ohio.

== History ==
Originally built for private use, the observatory was sold to Elmer Harrold, another private owner, who donated to Mount Union College upon the graduation of his daughter from the college. A new observatory was built on campus to house the observatory in 1923 and outfitted with the telescope from the first Clarke Observatory. The second observatory was demolished in 1969 and the telescope moved to East Hall at Mount Union College.

== Observatories ==
First Observatory

- Location: Dunkirk, New York
- Construction Began: 1897
- Benefactor: Charles Ezra Hequembourg
- Telescope Mounted: 1897, German equatorial
- First Telescope: George N. Saegmuller 9-inch refractor, 117-inch focal length
- First Light: 1897
- Dome Material: bronze
- Directors:
  - Charles Ezra Hequembourg, private owner (1897-1907)
  - Mrs. Hequembourg, private owner (1907-1914)

Second Observatory

- Location: Alliance, Ohio
- Construction Began: 1923
- Benefactor: Elmer Harrold
- First Telescope: George N. Saegmuller 9-inch refractor, 117-inch focal length, moved from New York
- Directors:
  - Elmer Harrold, private owner (1917-1919), donated to Mount Union College

Third Observatory

- Location: Alliance, Ohio
- Construction Began: 1969
- Refinished: 1952, by the Alliance Tool Company
- Telescope Mounted: 1969
- First Telescope: 9-inch Saegmuller, refurbished with 8.5-inch lens with 135-inch focal length by J. W. Fecker Company of Pittsburgh.
- Directors:
  - James P. Rodman

== See also ==
- List of astronomical observatories
