= St. Thomas Observatory =

Observatory in Minnesota, US

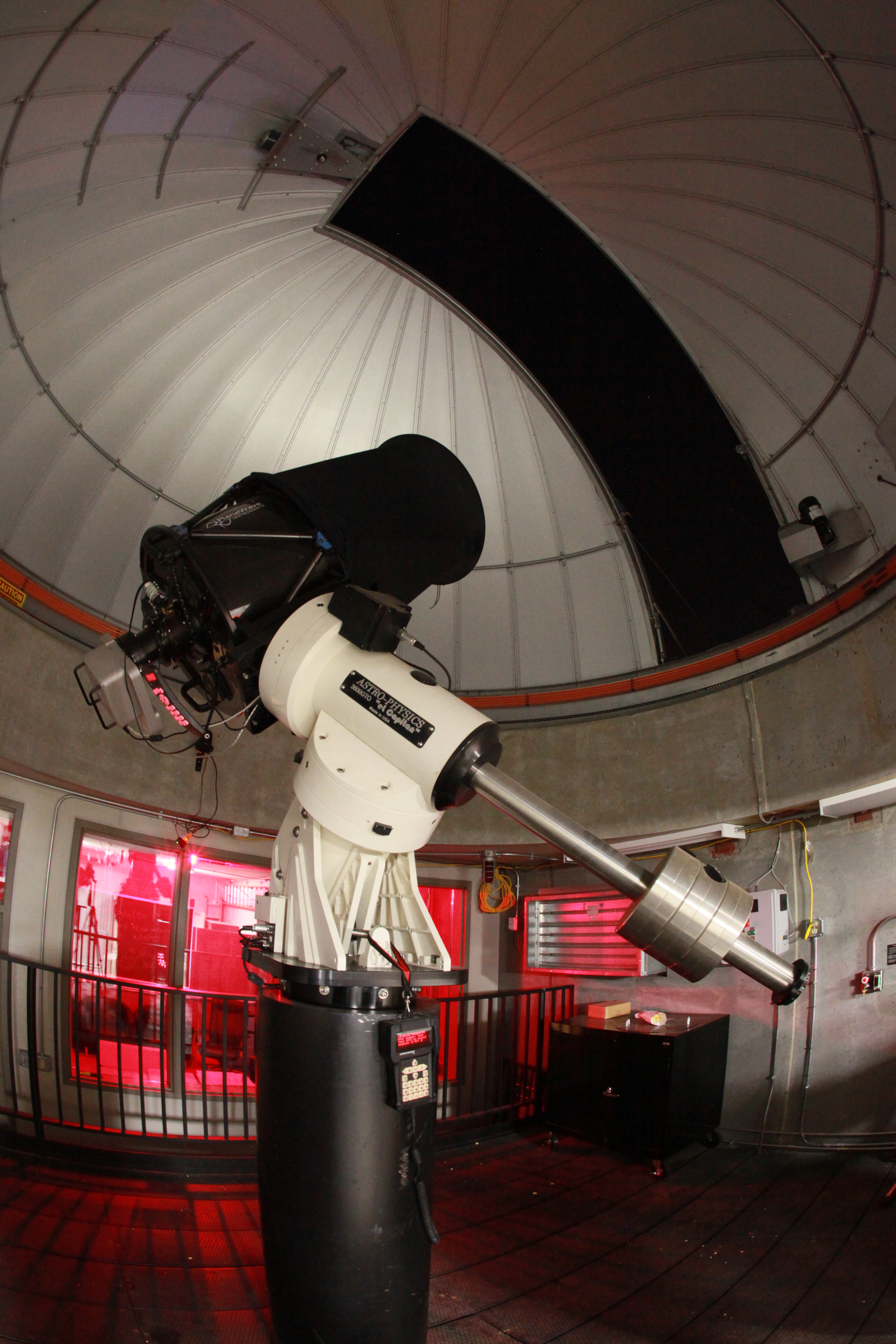
- Telescope and dome at the St. Thomas Observatory
- Organization: University of St. Thomas
- Location: Saint Paul, Minnesota, USA
- Coordinates: 44°56′21.4″N 93°11′36.8″W
- Altitude: 265 metres (869 ft)
- Established: September 29, 2009
- Website: cas.stthomas.edu/departments/areas-of-study/physics/observatory/

Telescopes
- 17-inch reflector

The St. Thomas Observatory is an astronomical observatory operated by the Department of Physics on the main campus of the University of St. Thomas in Minnesota. The observatory consists of an automated dome and a fully robotic 17-inch (0.43 m) corrected Dall-Kirkham reflecting telescope coupled with a 10.7-megapixel CCD camera. The observatory is used for public observing events and facilitates student research projects.

== See also ==
- List of astronomical observatories
