= Fick Observatory =

Observatory in Iowa, US

- Organization: Iowa State University
- Location: Boone, Iowa, United States
- Coordinates: 42°00′20.2″N 93°56′38.2″W
- Altitude: 314 m (1,030 ft)
- Website: Fick Observatory

Telescopes
- Mather: 0.6 m reflector
- Radio: 8.5 m dish

The Fick Observatory was an astronomical observatory owned and operated by Iowa State University. Located southwest of Boone, Iowa, it was named after Davenport, Iowa, amateur astronomer Erwin W. Fick. The observatory closed in 2015.

== History ==
Iowa State University’s original telescope and observatory, located northwest of Ames, was donated by the family of Milo Mather of Clarksville, Iowa, following his death in 1960. Mather was an accomplished amateur astronomer and mechanical engineering graduate (1907) of Iowa State. In 1970, the mirror from his telescope was reconditioned and used in a newly reconfigured telescope, also named after Mather, and installed in the Erwin W. Fick Observatory.

Iowa State built the Fick Observatory southwest of Boone, Iowa, in 1970. The facility was named after Erwin W. Fick (1897–1975), an amateur astronomer and retired member of the U.S. Corps of Engineers from Davenport, Iowa. Though Fick had never been to Ames, let alone graduated from Iowa State, he set up a trust through the ISU Foundation to help support Iowa State’s observatory. New imaging devices, such as the CCD (charge-coupled device) camera installed in 1990, and the short focal length of the telescope allowed researchers to obtain wide-field views of the sky to very faint limits. Measurements gathered by the Mather telescope could be used to complement data obtained by larger observatories, which often sacrifice wide views for fine detail. Over the years, Iowa State researchers used the Fick Observatory for a wide variety of studies, including stellar radial velocity observations, studies of ring galaxy collisions, and lunar occultation studies.

In 2015, the Erwin W. Fick Observatory closed. It was the last astronomical research observatory operated by a college or university at a dark-sky site in the state of Iowa.

On April 1, 2020, the Observatory and surrounding land (45.31 acres) was sold to Aaron Gillett for the price of $339,870.31 closing the observatory for good.

== Equipment ==
- 0.6 meter Cassegrain reflector, Mather telescope
- 8.5-meter parabolic dish antenna, Radio telescope
- Meade 14-inch Cassegrain reflector telescope
- Meade 10-inch Cassegrain reflector telescope
- Two Meade 8-inch Cassegrain reflector telescopes

== See also ==
- List of observatories
