= Texas A&M Astronomical Observatory =

Observatory in Texas, US

Physics Teaching Observatory, Texas A&M University
- Organization: Texas A&M University
- Location: College Station, Texas, U.S.
- Coordinates: 30°34′21.78″N 96°21′59.94″W
- Altitude: 86.2584 m (283.000 ft)
- Website: astronomy.physics.tamu.edu/observatory.html

Telescopes
- AMS Observatory: Unknown size reflector
- Texas A&M Robotic Telescope: Unknown size reflector

Texas A&M Astronomical Observatory is an astronomical observatory owned and operated by Texas A&M University's Department of Physics. It is located in College Station, Texas, USA.

- Elevation: 283 ft. (86.2584 m)

== See also ==
- List of observatories
