= Hobbs Observatory =

Observatory in Wisconsin, US

- Organization: University of Wisconsin–Eau Claire
- Observatory code: 750
- Location: Beaver Creek Reserve, Fall Creek, WI
- Coordinates: 44°48′57″N 91°16′18″W
- Altitude: 285 m (935 ft)
- Website: www.beavercreekreserve.org

Telescopes
- Unnamed Telescope: 24 inch reflector

Hobbs Observatory is an astronomical observatory owned and operated by University of Wisconsin–Eau Claire's Department of Physics and Astronomy and home to the Chippewa Valley Astronomical Society. It is located in the Beaver Creek Reserve four miles North of Fall Creek, Wisconsin. It is named after the Hobbs Foundation, a local philanthropic organization which provided money for the initial construction in 1978 and the purchase of a Navy telescope.

== See also ==
- List of astronomical observatories
