= Rolnick Observatory =

Observatory in Connecticut, US

The Westport Observatory
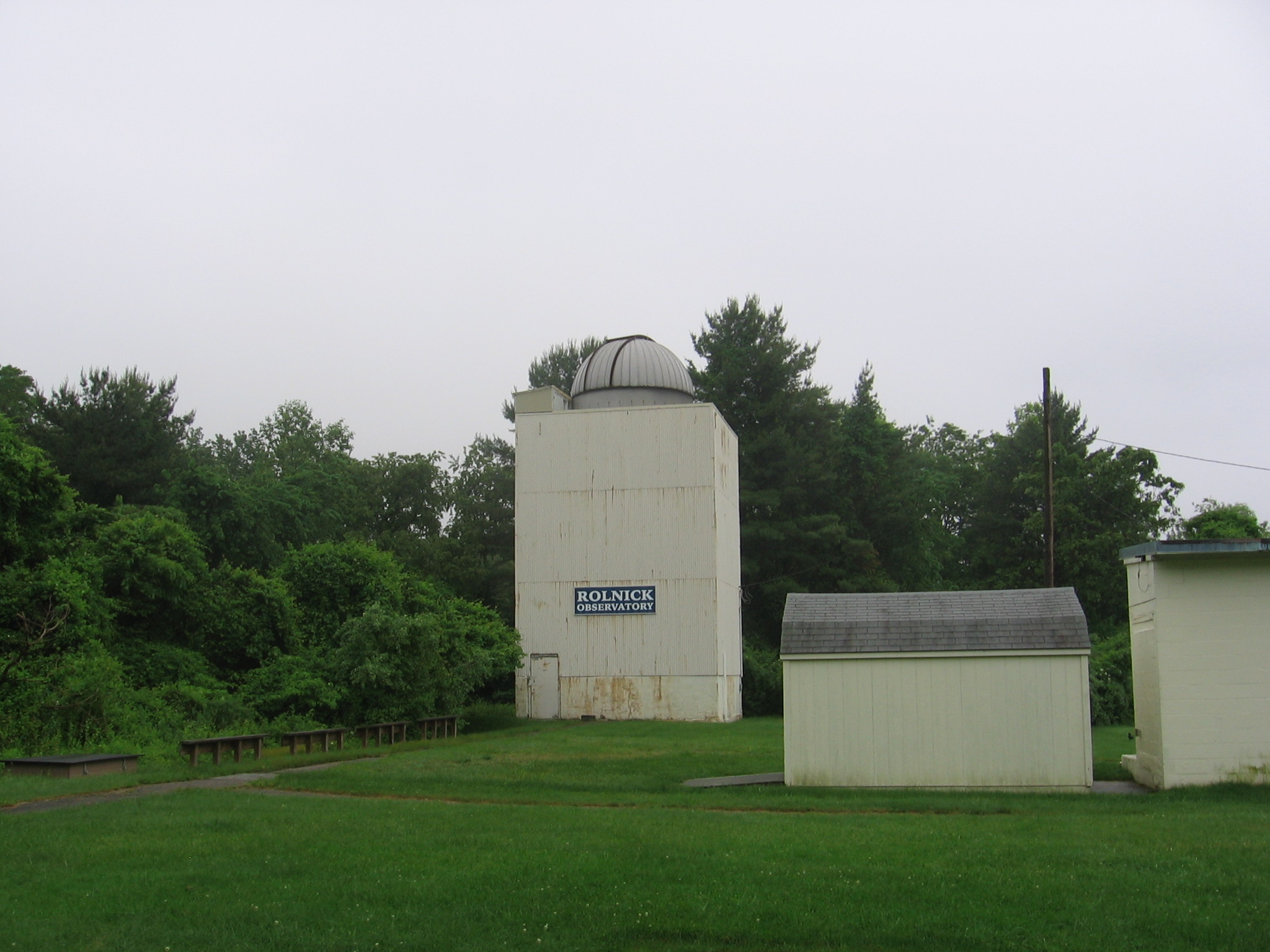
- The observatory in 2012
- Alternative names: Rolnick Observatory
- Organization: Westport Astronomical Society
- Location: Westport, Connecticut, USA
- Coordinates: 41°10′16″N 73°19′49.80″W
- Website: www.was-ct.org

Telescopes
- The Dome Telescope: 16" Meade LX200
- The Big Gun: 25 in (64 cm) Obsession Dobsonian

The Westport Observatory is an astronomical observatory in Westport, Connecticut, operated by the Westport Astronomical Society and formerly known as the Rolnick Observatory. The observatory is located at the highest elevation in the town. It was built upon the former BR-73 Nike missile site in the mid-1960s and has undergone several upgrades and refurbishments since then.

== See also ==
- List of astronomical observatories
