= Vanderbilt University Observatory =

Observatory in Tennessee, US

Vanderbilt Dyer Observatory
- Organization: Vanderbilt University
- Location: Nashville, TN
- Coordinates: 36.0524°N 86.8053°W

Telescopes
- unnamed: 8 1/2 inch refractor

Vanderbilt Dyer Observatory was an astronomical observatory at Vanderbilt University in Nashville, Tennessee. The instruments were used for teaching purposes only.

== Directors ==
- William J. Vaughn

== Telescopes ==
Equatorial of 8 1/2 inches

Transit circle of 5 inches

== See also ==
- List of astronomical observatories
