= Naylor Observatory =

Observatory in Pennsylvania, US

- Organization: Astronomical Society of Harrisburg
- Location: Lewisberry, Pennsylvania, United States
- Coordinates: 40.1469°N 76.8989°W
- Altitude: 170 m (560 ft)
- Established: 1955
- Website: Naylor Observatory

Naylor Observatory is an astronomical observatory owned and operated by Astronomical Society of Harrisburg. It is located near Lewisberry, Pennsylvania, United States.

== History ==
The Astronomical Society of Harrisburg (ASH) was formed in 1955. It is one of the oldest astronomical societies in the country. One of its original goals was to construct a local observatory. The members first constructed a 12.5" Dall-Kirkham Cassegrain telescope to place in the new observatory. They then attempted to purchase a plot of land for $1000. This plot of land was discovered to be adjacent to a to-be-built night club and the money was refunded.

The society learned a valuable lesson and planned the observatory out more accurately. The present property, two miles northwest of Lewisberry, was acquired in 1966. Since the society had not had an established history, even with 60 members acquiring funding for the construction became an issue. Nonetheless, the French Dome, the observatory's first building, was completed in 1967. The society spent the next 5 years, ending in 1971, raising money to fund the observatory's initial construction. By 1987, the Asper operations/administration building, telescope viewing pads, and several telescope storage buildings were constructed.

The club continued expanding and in 1979 a 12.5" f/6 Cave Astrola Newtonian reflecting telescope was installed in the Culver roll-off observatory. In the 1990s, a 17" f/15 classical Cassegrain reflector replaced the second telescope, a 16" Newtonian, that had been housed in the French Dome observatory. A second roll-off observatory was constructed in 2005. The King roll-off observatory features two 14" f/10 Meade Schmidt-Cassegrain catadioptric telescopes. A third roll-off observatory, which houses a 10" f/7 Ritchey–Chrétien Cassegrain and an 80mm f/6 refractor intended for CCD imaging, was constructed in late 2013. ASH also owns a number of smaller telescopes, including a 40mm Coronado PST hydrogen-alpha solar telescope, 6, 8, and 10" Dobsonian reflectors, a 10" f/7 Cave Astrola Newtonian, and a 10" f/10 Meade Schmidt-Cassegrain catadioptric.

== See also ==
- List of astronomical observatories
