= Crane Observatory =

Observatory in Kansas, US

- Organization: Washburn University
- Location: Topeka, Kansas (US)
- Coordinates: 39°2′9.5″N 95°41′56.0″W
- Website: www.washburn.edu/about/community/crane-observatory.html

Telescopes

Crane Observatory is an astronomical observatory owned and operated by Washburn University. It is located in Topeka, Kansas.

== See also ==
- List of observatories
