= Ten Acre Observatory =

Observatory in Oklahoma, US

- Organization: Odyssey Astronomy Club
- Location: in Tribbey, Oklahoma (USA)
- Coordinates: 35°05′19″N 97°07′15″W
- Established: 1999

Telescopes
- Coulter Optics: 13.1" f 4.5 Newtonian on a Dobsonian mount
- Starmaster: 20" f 4.5 Newtonian on a computerized goto/tracking Dobsonian mount

Ten Acre Observatory (TAO) features a 20" f 4.5 Starmaster Telescope and a 13" Coulter Optics Telescope as its primary and secondary viewing instruments. It is open to the public by appointment. Services and use of equipment are at no cost. astronomical observatory It is owned and operated by Nick Lazzaro and is used by the Odyssey Astronomy Club as its primary viewing site. It is located in Tribbey, Oklahoma (USA) and serves the Central Oklahoma Area.

== See also ==
- List of astronomical observatories
