= Yuba City Astronomical Observatory =

Observatory in California, US

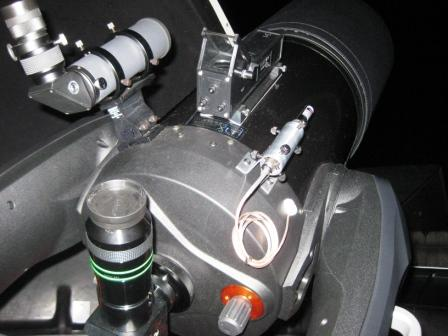
- Location: South Yuba City, Yuba City, California, United States
- Coordinates: 39°06′52.74″N 121°38′02.85″W
- Established: September 22, 2010
- Website: www.ycao.org

Telescopes
- CPC 1100: 11" Schmidt Cassegrain

Yuba City Astronomical Observatory is an astronomical observatory owned by the Doscher Family Trust and operated primarily by trustee Richard J. Doscher of Yuba City, California. It is located South of Yuba City, which is adjacent to the Sutter Buttes Mountain Range.

The observatory has one 9 foot dome and permanent pier housing an 11-inch Schmidt-Cassegrain telescope. It was established on September 22, 2010. Primary work consists of planetary, deep sky, NEO studies, astrometry, photometry and astrophotography. IAU/MPC assignment number pending.

== See also ==
- List of astronomical observatories
