= Martz Observatory =

Observatory in New York state, US

- Organization: The Marshal Martz Memorial Astronomical Association
- Location: Chautauqua County, New York (USA)
- Coordinates: 42°0′31″N 79°4′0″W
- Website: www.martzobservatory.org

Martz Observatory, now known as the Martz-Kohl Observatory, is a public, not-for-profit organization devoted to the amateur astronomer. The emphasis of the association is observational astronomy, well-rooted in public education and enjoyment of the starry skies. It was founded by, and eventually named after, Marshal Martz, an amateur astronomer from Jamestown, NY who built the first large telescope (a 30-inch reflector) ever used at the observatory.

The Marshal Martz Memorial Astronomical Association, Inc. was formed to carry out the following mission: “To inform, educate, and inspire the general public and support teaching in the sciences of astronomy and physics through accessible, engaging, and entertaining programs.”

The observatory is located just outside Frewsburg, NY (Chautauqua County) on six acres of rural property, and hosts weekly public observing nights. The main telescope, a 24-inch Dall-Kirkham Cassegrain reflector, can be controlled manually, or positioned from a nearby "control room" electronically. Several smaller telescopes, which members are free to use at their convenience, are located on the grounds.

The Martz Observatory serves as a public education site, as well as a satellite teaching facility for local institutions, particularly Jamestown Community College in nearby Jamestown, NY.

== See also ==
- List of observatories
