= Foggy Bottom Observatory =

Astronomical observatory in Hamilton, New York

- Observatory code: 776
- Location: Colgate University, Hamilton, New York
- Coordinates: 42°48′59″N 75°31′57″W
- Altitude: 343.2 m (1,126 ft)
- Website: observatory.colgate.edu/foggybot/foggybot.html

Telescopes
- Model 1216 telescope ('66 Chrysler Powder Blue): 16" reflector

Foggy Bottom Observatory is an astronomical observatory owned and operated by Colgate University. Its IAU code is 776. Built in 1951, it is located in Hamilton, New York (USA).

== See also ==
- List of astronomical observatories
