= Kyung Hee Astronomical Observatory =

- Organization: Kyung Hee University
- Location: Yong-in, Gyeonggi-Do, South Korea
- Coordinates: 37°14′19″N 127°4′56″E
- Website: http://khao.khu.ac.kr/

Telescopes
- Unnamed: 75-cm Ritchey-Chrétien telescope

Kyung Hee Astronomical Observatory is an astronomical observatory owned and operated by Kyung Hee University. It is located in Giheung-gu, Yongin, South Korea. It was the first observatory in the nation to discover a variable star, later named the Kyung Hee Star.
