= Kottamia Astronomical Observatory =

Astronomical observatory in Egypt

Coordinates: 29°56′02″N 31°49′40″E

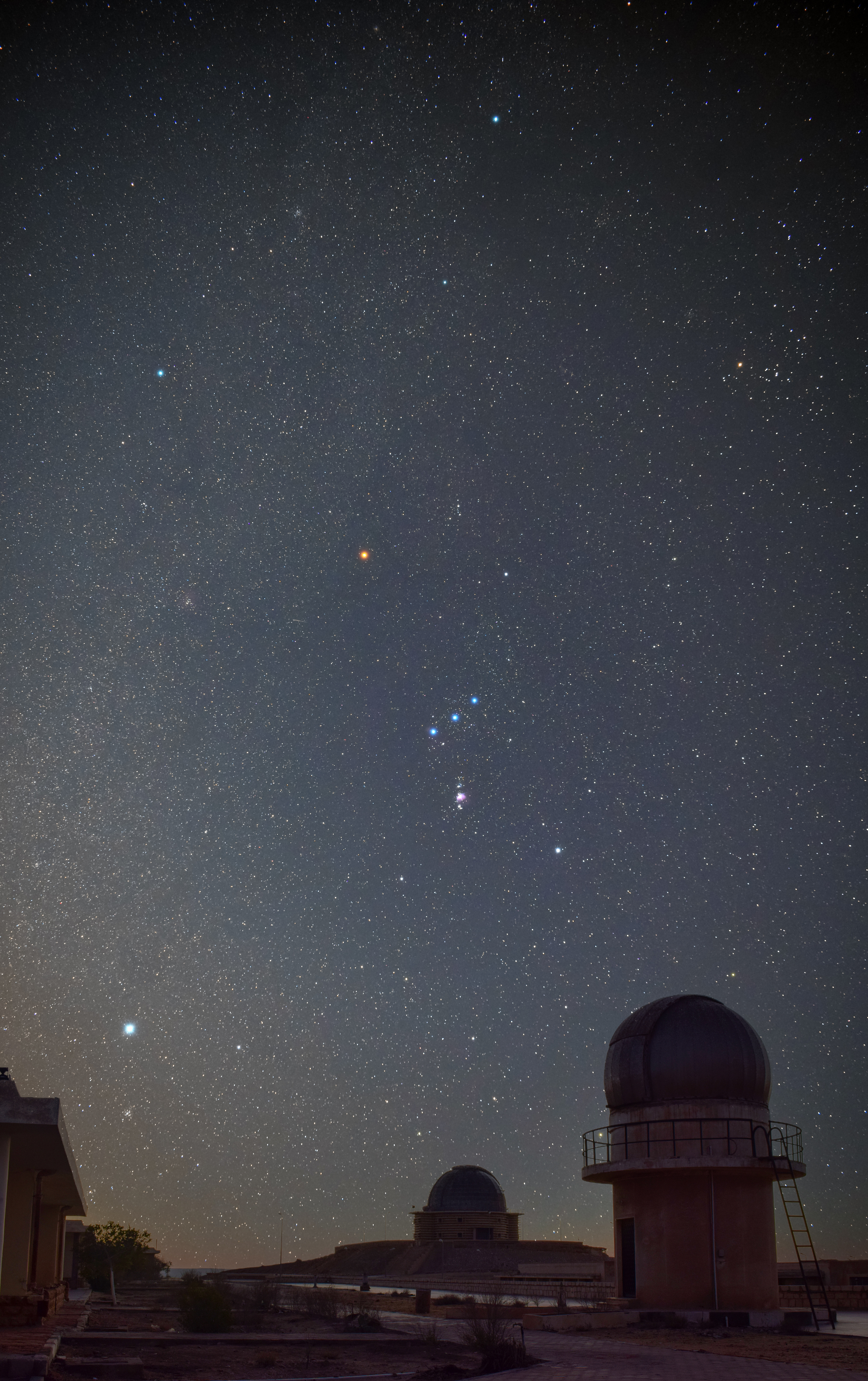
Winter Constellations, taken from the Kottamia Astronomical Observatory, Cairo, Egypt, in December 2021

Kottamia Astronomical Observatory is the largest telescope in the Arab world, including the Middle East and North Africa. The telescope, which is located 80 km from the center of Cairo, has a main mirror diameter of about 1.88 meters.

The National Research Institute of Astronomy & Geophysics (NRIAG) of Egypt operates the Kottamia Observatory through its Astronomy Department.
