= Cawthron Atkinson Observatory =

Observatory in Nelson, New Zealand

Atkinson Observatory
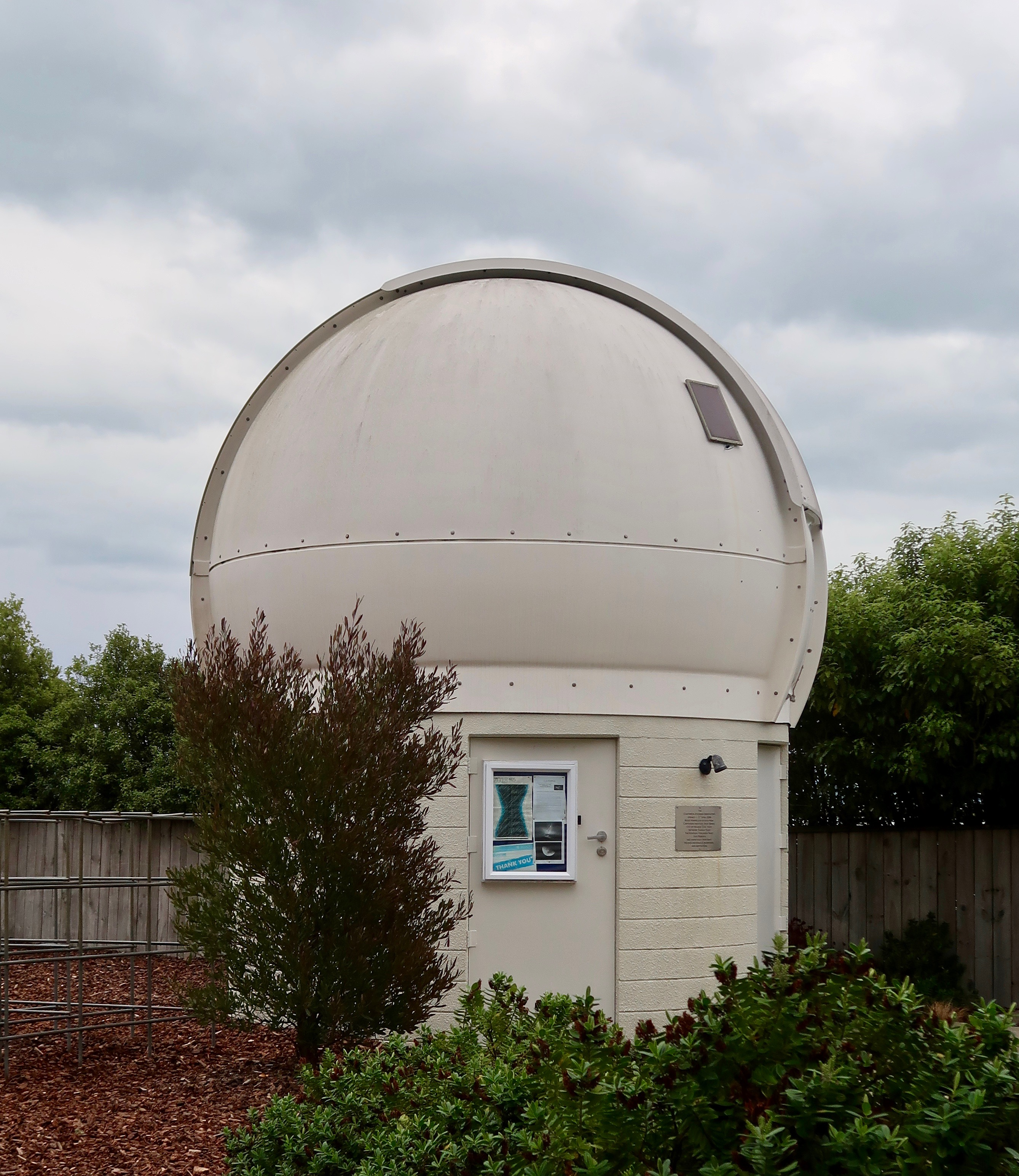
- Alternative names: Nelson Observatory
- Organization: Nelson Science Society
- Observatory code: E81
- Location: Clifton Terrace School, Nelson, New Zealand
- Coordinates: 41.2253°S 173.3216°E
- Established: 2008 (1883)

Cawthron Atkinson Observatory (formerly Atkinson Observatory) is sited in the grounds of Clifton Terrace School, Nelson, New Zealand, after previously being situated at Pipers Park for many years.

First operated in 1883, the observatory was founded by Arthur Atkinson, a keen amateur astronomer and Member of Parliament for Nelson. A newer observatory building opened in 1982.

The now relocated and renamed observatory formally opened on 12 April 2008, after completing a major refurbishment of the structure and 129-year-old telescope. This work was funded by contributions from various individuals and groups, such as a NZ$50,000 donation by the Cawthron Trust. The old telescope has since been replaced by a Celestron C11

The observatory is administered by the Nelson Astronomical Society Inc. Public viewing nights are held most clear Friday evenings at the observatory April to September inclusive, and society meetings are held the first Thursday of the month at Cawthron Institute, 98 Halifax Street East, Nelson.. Further information is available on the Nelson Astronomical Society webpage and their Facebook page,
