= PAGASA Observatory =

Astronomical observatory in Quezon City, Philippines

- Alternative names: PAGASA Astronomical Observatory
- Organization: Philippine Atmospheric, Geophysical and Astronomical Services Administration
- Location: Quezon City, Philippines
- Coordinates: 14°39′04″N 121°04′20″E
- Established: 1954

Telescopes
- Diameter: 45cm
- Imaging: Computer-based
- Type of Telescope: Cassegrain reflector

The PAGASA Astronomical Observatory, also known as the PAGASA Observatory, is an astronomical observatory in Quezon City, Metro Manila, Philippines, within the University of the Philippines Diliman campus. Established in 1954 and managed by the Philippine Atmospheric, Geophysical and Astronomical Services Administration (PAGASA), the facility hosts the largest operational telescope in the Philippines.

The facility's observatory dome hosts a computer-based 45 cm (1.48 ft) Cassegrain reflector telescope installed at the site in May 2001 and donated by the Japanese government through a cultural aid grant. Before this period, the observatory used a 30 cm (0.98 ft) reflector-type telescope. The current telescope is often used for CCD imaging of stars.

The PAGASA Observatory was opened for public use on February 16, 2003, during National Astronomy Week.

== See also ==
- Manila Observatory
