= Pachmarhi Telescope Array =

Pachmarhi Array of Cerenkov Telescopes (PACT)
- Organization: Tata Institute of Fundamental Research
- Location: Pachmarhi, Madhya Pradesh, India
- Coordinates: 22°28′00″N 76°26′00″E
- Altitude: 1,075 m (3,527 ft)
- Established: 1986
- Website: http://www.tifr.res.in/~hegro/

Telescopes
- High Energy Gamma Ray Observatory: Gamma Ray Telescope Array

The Pachmarhi Telescope Array or Pachmarhi Array of Cerenkov Telescopes (PACT) is an array of 24 telescopes for gamma-ray astronomy. It is located at Pachmarhi in Madhya Pradesh, India. It is operated by the Tata Institute of Fundamental Research.

== Location ==
The Pachmarhi telescope array stands at Pachmarhi, Madhya Pradesh, India. It is located at an altitude of 1,075 m (3,527 ft).

== History ==
The array was established in 1986.

== Telescope ==
The Pachmarhi Array of Cerenkov Telescope is set in an area 80 meter by 100 meter in 5x5 matrix. Each telescope consists of 7 parabolic mirrors each with a diameter of 90 cm. Each telescope is independently steerable on its equatorial mount. It uses the wavefront sampling technique to detect TeV gamma rays.

== See also ==
- Lists of telescopes
