= Vernonia Peak Observatory =

Observatory in Oregon, US

- Organization: Northwest Astronomy Group
- Location: Vernonia, Oregon
- Coordinates: 45.79977°N 123.21036°W
- Altitude: 340 metres (1,115 ft)
- Website: www.nwag.portland.or.us

Telescopes
- Hammil: 24 inch composite mirror equivalent to 200 inches (508 cm) or larger
- Newtonian: 12.5 inch Newtonian Reflector equiv. to 130 inches (330 cm)

Vernonia Peak Observatory or VPO is a private research facility astronomical observatory owned and operated by Northwest Astronomy Group. It is located near Vernonia between Portland and Astoria, Oregon, US.

== See also ==
- List of observatories
