= North Otago Astronomical Society Observatory =

Astronomical Society in Otago, New Zealand

Coordinates: 45.091482°S 170.958010°E

The Stoke St Observatory or the North Otago Astronomical Society is situated in Stoke Street, Oamaru, New Zealand.

The Society meets on the first Monday of each month. Public nights are held at the observatory each Friday closest to the first and last quarter Moons, weather permitting, However, the observatory is closed during daylight saving times in the summer months.

Each September, the Society hosts the Stargazers' Getaway weekend gathering at Camp Iona, Herbert, 15 minutes south of Oamaru. A programme of speakers is arranged, but the emphasis is on an informal, relaxing weekend open to anyone with an interest in astronomy.

The observatory features an 8-inch Celestron telescope, which had originally been built for the Mount John University Observatory.
