= William P. Bidelman =

American astronomer

William Pendry Bidelman
- Born: September 25, 1918; Los Angeles, California, US
- Died: May 3, 2011 (aged 92); Murfreesboro, Tennessee, US
- Education: Harvard College, University of Chicago
- Known for: co-discovery of the barium stars with Philip Keenan, expert on the peculiar stars.
- Spouse: Verna Pearl Shirk (1918–2009; her death)
- Scientific career
- Fields: astronomer, astrophysicist
- Workplaces: Yerkes Observatory, Lick Observatory, Michigan Observatory; McDonald Observatory, Warner and Swasey Observatory
- Doctoral advisor: William Wilson Morgan
- Doctoral students: Craig Chester

William Pendry Bidelman (/ˈbaɪdəlmæn/ BY-dəl-man; September 25, 1918 – May 3, 2011) was an American astronomer. Born in Los Angeles, and raised in North Dakota, he was noted for classifying the spectra of stars, and considered a pioneer in recognizing and classifying sub-groups of the peculiar stars.

Bidelman's undergraduate degree was from Harvard College, and his Ph.D. in astronomy was from the University of Chicago under advisor William Wilson Morgan. He was a physicist in the Army during World War II. A professional astronomer for over 50 years, Bidelman taught for ~41 years at The University of Chicago, The University of California,

He co-discovered the class of barium stars with Philip Keenan, the phosphorus and the mercury stars, and was the first to describe the hydrogen-deficient carbon stars.

Born in Los Angeles, California, Bidelman was raised in North Dakota, where he met his future wife of 69 years. He was a father of four and a grandfather. As an Emeritus Professor William P. Bidelman continued working in astronomy after he retired from teaching, and was 92 when he died in Murfreesboro, Tennessee.

== Education ==
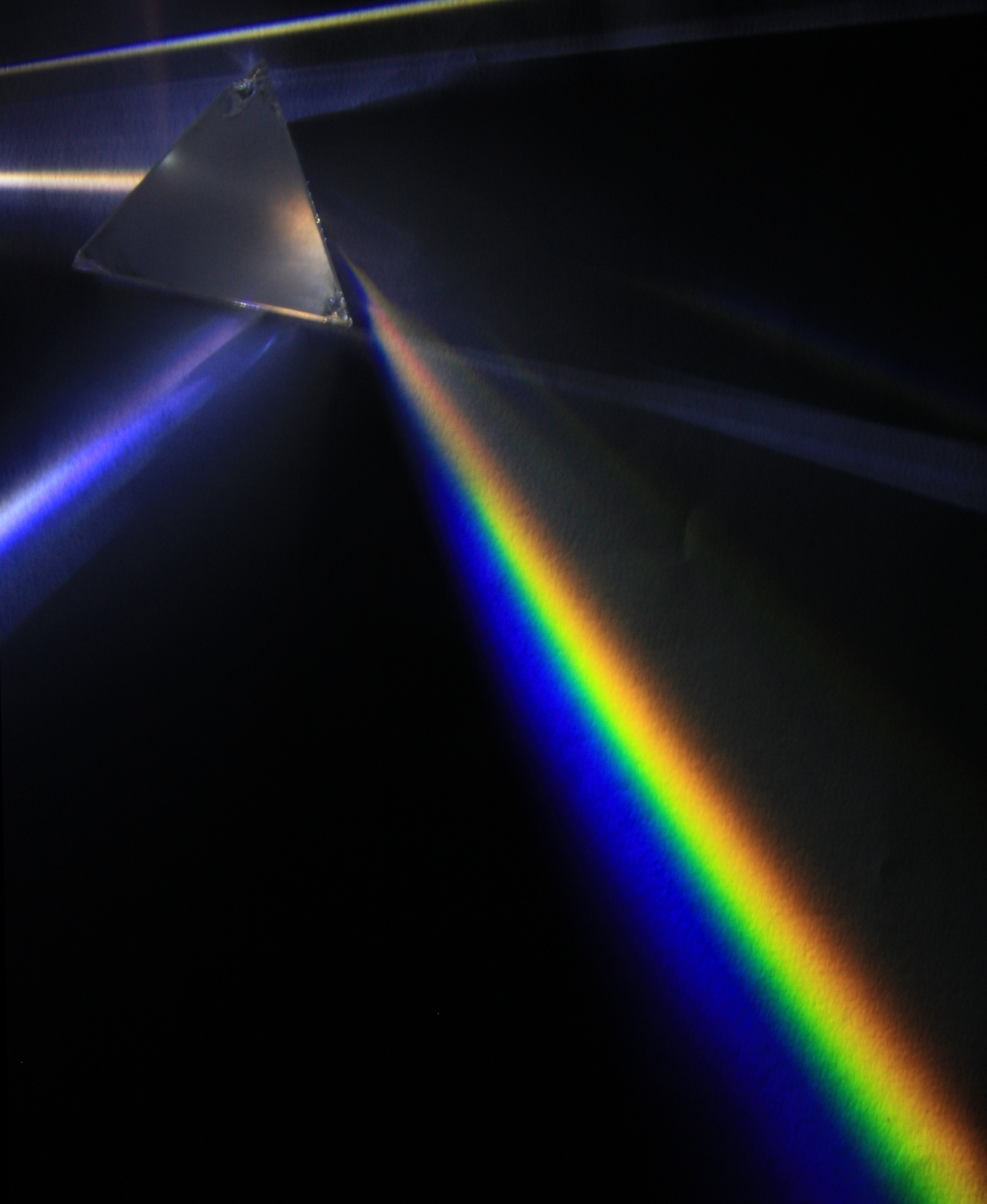
A prism disperses visible light disperse when passing through a prism, displaying a spectrum.

As an undergraduate at Harvard College, Bidelman received an Honorary Harvard College Scholarship for academic excellence in 1939. He graduated in 1940. Bidelman entered the graduate program at the University of Chicago affiliated with Yerkes Observatory. His doctoral advisor was William W.Morgan, who discovered the first definite evidence that the Milky Way Galaxy is a spiral galaxy, and, with Philip Keenan, the Morgan-Keenan (MK) system of stellar classification. As a graduate student, Bidelman assisted Morgan and Keenan by taking some of the spectrograms for their book, An Atlas of Stellar Spectra.

For his 1943 dissertation, Bidelman reported the Double Cluster in the I Persei association is physically associated with neighborhood supergiant stars, and is part of an association of O- and B-type stars, and designated 47 stars as its members. Bidelman received his Ph.D. in 1943. The Yerkes astronomy graduate program directed by Otto Struve began issuing degrees in 1940, and he was among their first ten graduates.

== Career ==
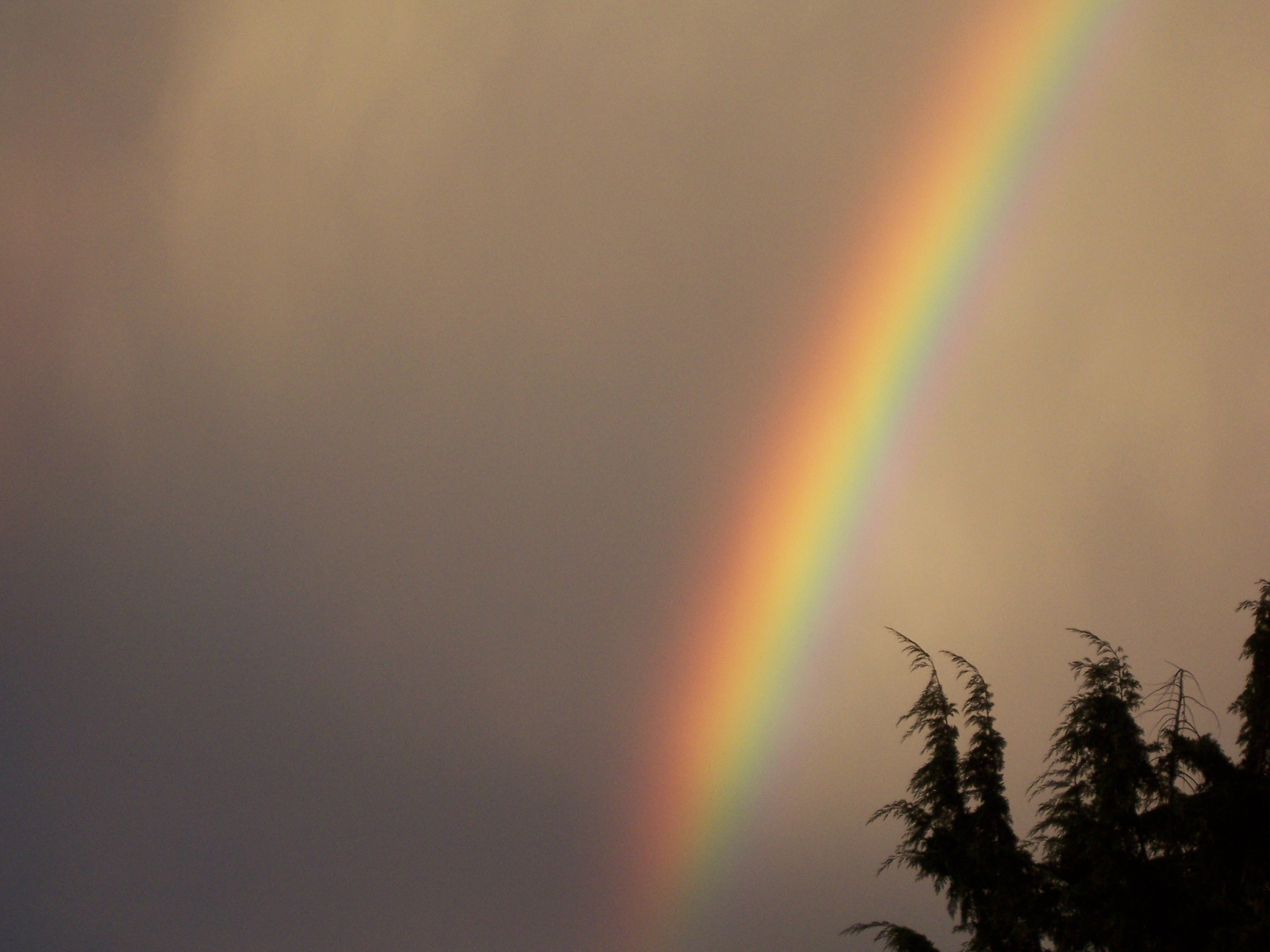
Though the colors of a star's spectrum appear similar to a rainbow, a rainbow emits no light. Information about elements present at a star's surface, and many other features are found within the spectrum of a star.

Bidelman served in the U.S. Army's Ballistic Research Laboratory at Aberdeen Proving Ground for over 2 years during World War II,. He attended the 1942 American Astronomical Society's annual meeting despite a small assembly due to gasoline rationing during World War II.

=== University of Chicago, Yerkes Observatory ===
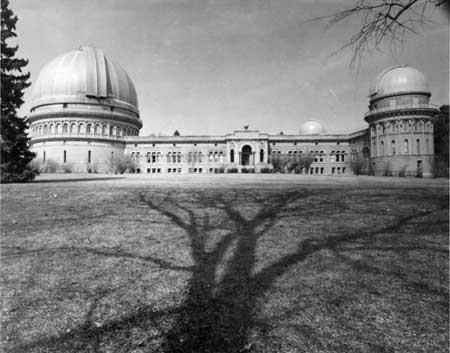
Yerkes, located in the village of Williams Bay, Wisconsin is where faculty and students lived, and they rarely visited the Chicago campus.

In 1945, when Bidelman left Aberdeen he was hired at Yerkes as an Instructor. Under Otto Struve Yerkes became the leading astrophysics center, when he directed it. In addition to Bidelman, by 1946 the Yerkes astronomy staff included Paul Ledoux, Arne Slettebak, Armin Deutsch, Marshall Wrubel, Arthur D. Code, Carlos Cesco, Víctor M. Blanco, W. W. Morgan, Otto Struve, Jesse L. Greenstein, Gerard P. Kuiper, George Van Biesbroeck, Louis G. Henyey Anne B. Underhill, Guido Münch, Nancy G. Roman, and the two future Nobel Prize winners, Subrahmanyan Chandrasekhar and Gerhard Herzberg. Other astronomers at Yerkes when Bidelman was there were Kaj Strand, W. Albert Hiltner, Aden B. Meinel, and visiting professors Bengt Strömgren from Denmark, and Jan Oort, Hendrik C. van de Hulst and Adriaan Blaauw from the Netherlands. George Herbig, also there, remembered it as an "exciting, stimulating place to work" and a "powerhouse in astronomy" while under Struve's direction.

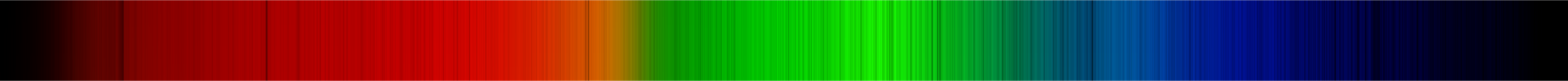
A spectrum from the star Capella. Vertical absorption lines are related to the elements and ions present in a star's atmosphere.

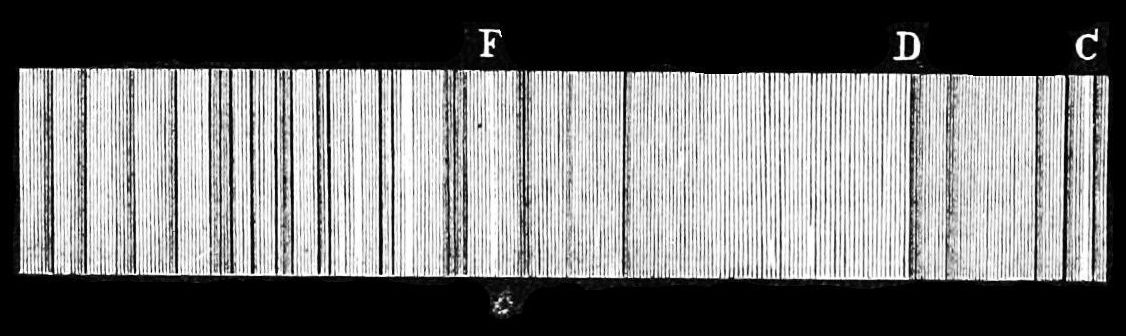
A spectrum from an R CrB star in black and white displays some of its complexity. As a spectroscopist, Bidelman needed to identify the origins of lines like these.

Bidelman spent long hours observing in remote west Texas at McDonald Observatory because he, like other Yerkes faculty, was also an astronomer at the University of Texas (UT). At the suggestion of Struve, the two universities had cooperated to create McDonald Observatory when the UT system had no astronomy department but W. J. McDonald gave them money in 1926 for an observatory, while in Wisconsin, the Yerkes astronomers needed a larger telescope but lacked the funds to obtain one.

Otto Struve, who directed both Yerkes and McDonald, has been described as dedicated yet demanding. His managerial style included daily inspections of the faculty to see if they were working. Despite reports of tensions there was also "close knit camaraderie" and "boisterous parties" evidenced by Yerkes "spontaneous party songs" including "The Billy Bidelman Song". Sung to the tune of "The Battle Hymn of the Republic", it consisted of repeating three times the line: "Struve, Kuiper, Hiltner, Morgan, Chandrasekhar too," followed by: "And Billy Bidelman". (Note: The authors who have noted "The Billy Bidelman Song" stated: "No one seems to recall why William P. Bidelman deserved such august company, but it must have seemed a good idea at the time". They also noted that the "W. W. W. W. Morgan" song has apparently, and "perhaps fortunately" been lost.)

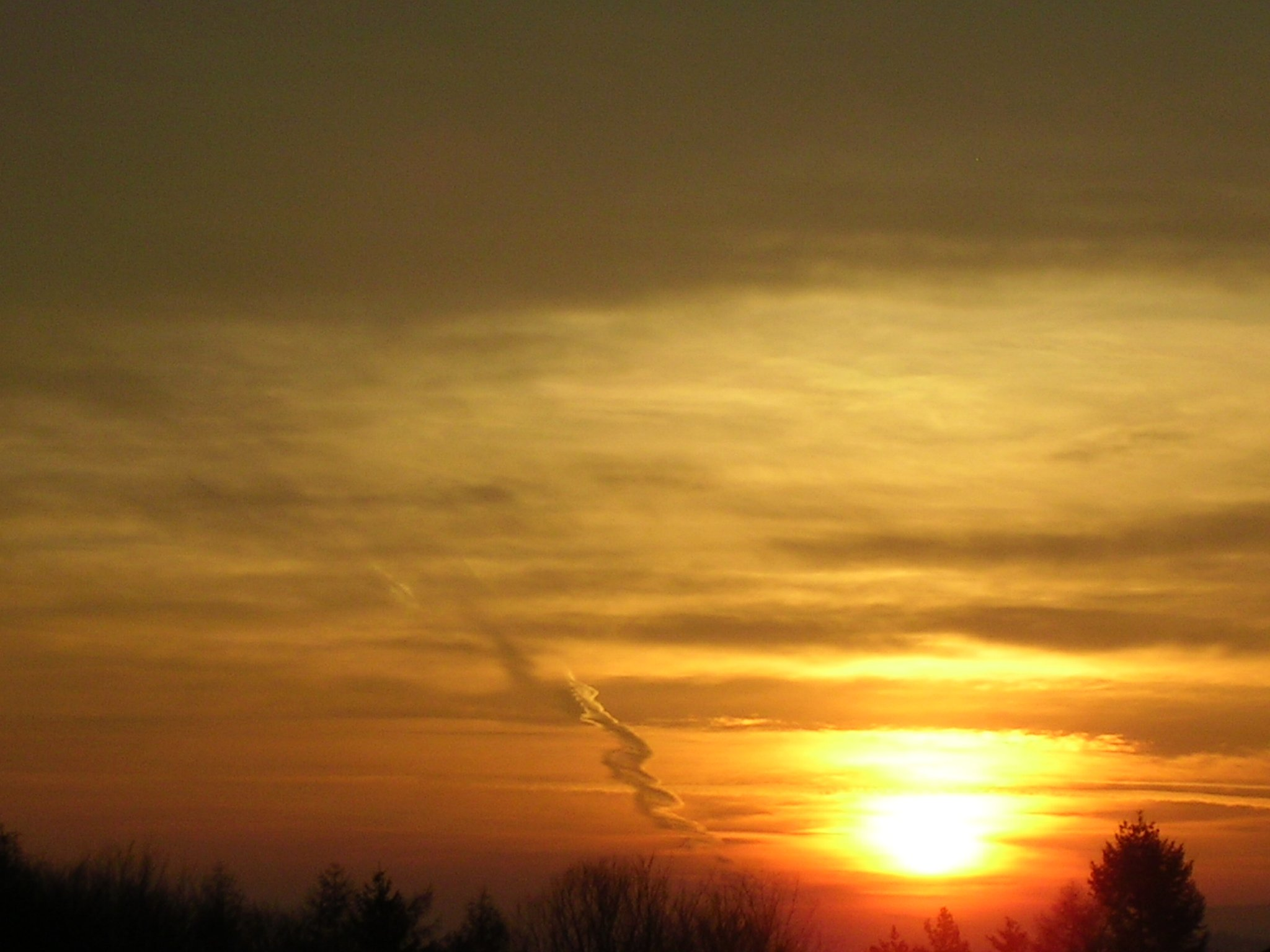
To accurately understand the stars, astronomers must compensate for the impact of dust between the stars that will make them appear dimmer and redder than they are. Dust causes the sky to redden at sunset and sunrise, when being seen at the horizon through more of our atmosphere.

In 1946, W. W. Morgan and William P. Bidelman published a paper on interstellar reddening using the MK system of spectral classifications and photoelectric photometry. Morgan later said this paper with Bidelman on interstellar reddening was "the principal paper along the way" to the UBV system, which he devised with Harold Johnson.

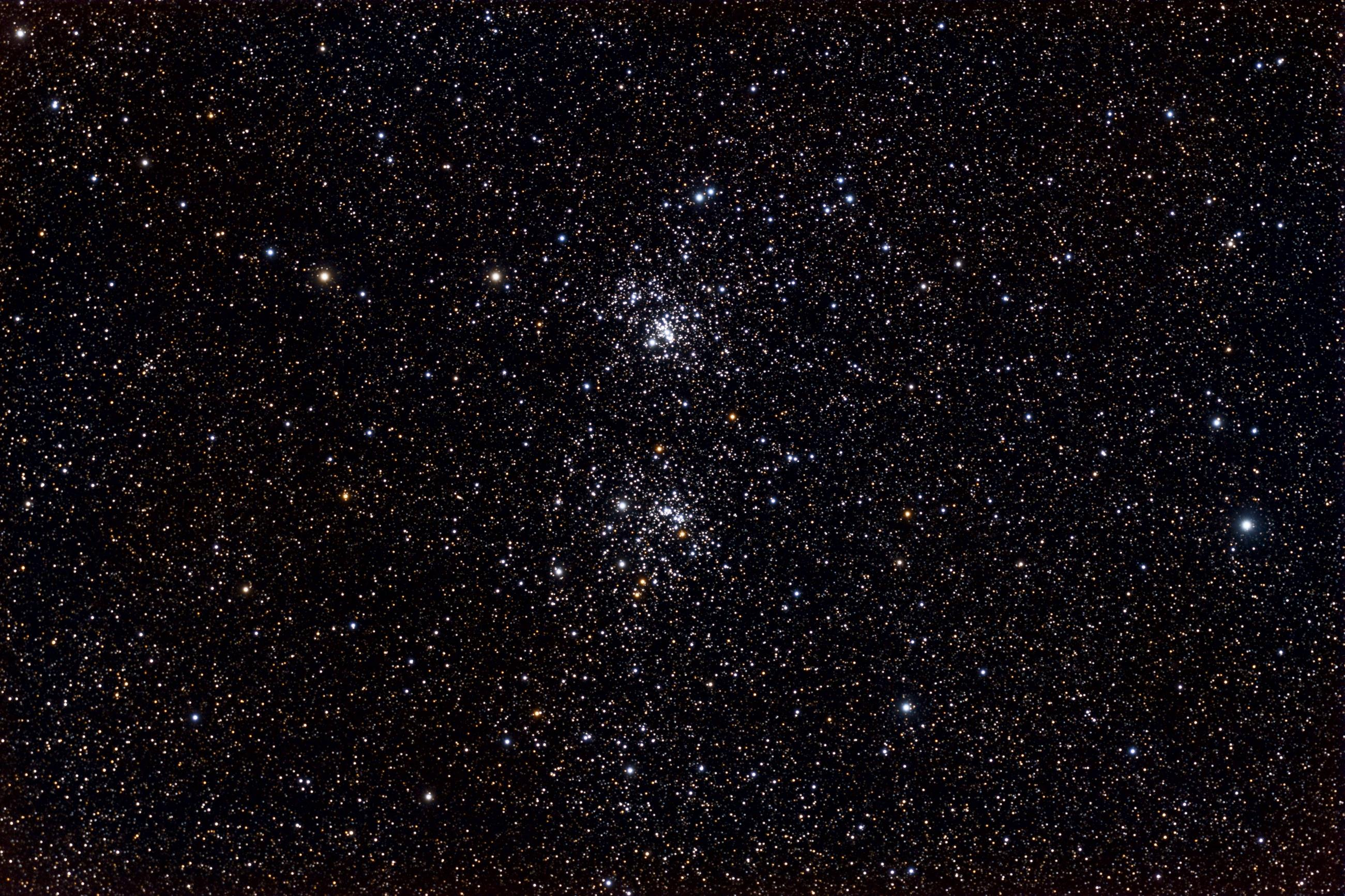
Star clusters are contain stars born at the same time out of the same material and are the same distance from Earth, and can be valuable in understanding how stars change over time.

In 1947, Bidelman became first to note the concentration of type M supergiant stars around χ Per, suggesting they were young Population I objects.

This group, along with the Double Cluster, was later named the Perseus OB1 Association. Based on its radial velocity, Bidelman also became first to see that S Persei is part of the Per OB1 association, which was later confirmed. Among the first stars that were studied at far-infrared wavelengths, M-type supergiants may be used to find the spiral arms of the Milky Way galaxy. Bidelman found four red supergiant stars in 1947, bringing the total then known to 13. How red supergiant stars evolved was considered an "astronomical puzzle", so the Double Cluster was used to test ideas about the evolution of red supergiant stars during the 1960s. The M-type supergiants of h and χ Per became the prototypes of this class of stars, and the major source of data for their properties.

Unlike most the usual relatively young star clusters including few supergiant stars, 18 were found in the Double Cluster of Perseus by 2007, which Robert F. Wing noted as the 60th anniversary of Bidelman's "important paper", saying Bidelman's 1947 two-dimensional classifications of the then-known supergiants in h and χ Per had "served as the benchmark" for later studies of the red supergiant stars.

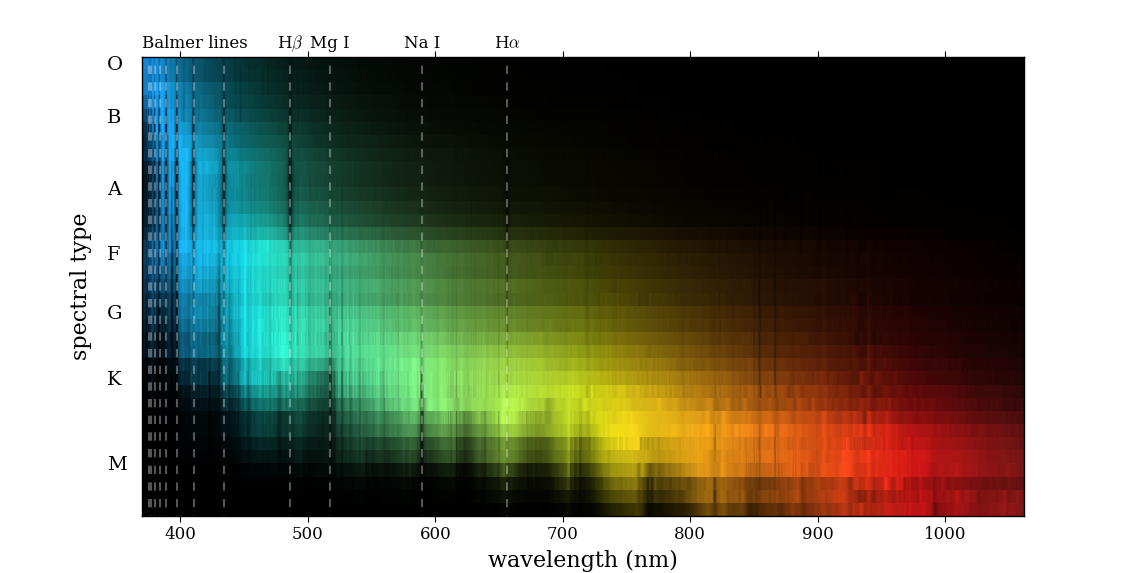
Vertical Lines of H-alpha and Balmer lines are shown using spectra from many dwarf stars. Weak Balmer lines show a star's atmosphere to be hydrogen-deficient.

Hydrogen is the most abundant element in the Universe, so stars displaying very little hydrogen in their atmospheres are chemically peculiar stars. There are many kinds of hydrogen-deficient stars. Upsilon Sagittarii is a hydrogen-deficient star. It is a very luminous, variable, and unusual eclipsing binary with a spectrum quite difficult to classify. In 1949, Bidelman was possibly the first to suggest that Upsilon (υ) Sagittarii's violet-shifted absorption lines, which apparently takes place during some conjunctions of this binary pair when star 2 advances in front of star 1, could be caused by gas streaming from the primary star. Bidelman suggested when the displaced H-alpha(Hα) absorption line was present, it happened at regular intervals when the primary star was furthest away from Earth.

Upsilon Sag was the only example of a star of its type until Bidelman discovered another star similar to it, HD 30353. This star became known as "Bidelman's star".

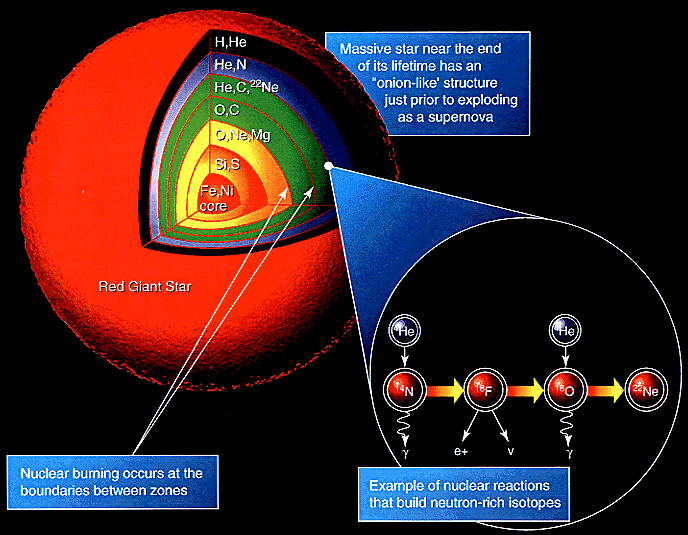
Stars make elements, and what a star makes depend on its mass at its beginning. When Bidelman and Keenan noticed a strong line of ionized barium at the position λ4554 in the spectra of stars theories said were too young and the wrong kind to produce any barium, it created a mystery for astronomers.

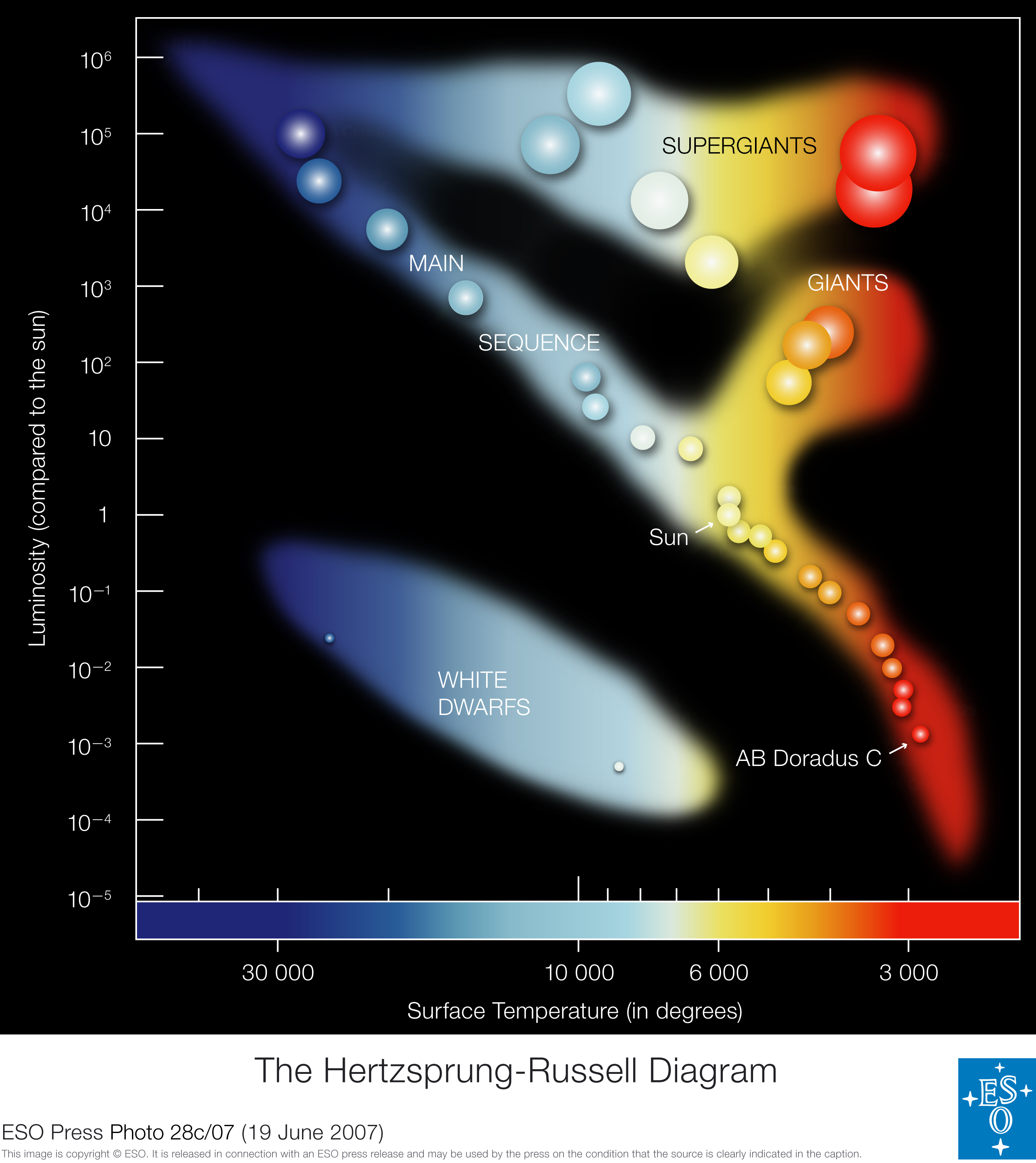
When Hertzsprung and Russell independently plotted stars on a chart of luminosity vs. temperature, they found there are patterns. The HR Diagram is a tool used by astronomers to know what stars are and how they will change.

Bidelman and Keenan were the first to regard the barium star red giants as different from other red giants and to describe them as a spectroscopic class. Barium is a heavy metal element made by certain advanced stars with a helium-burning shell surrounding a spent carbon core In addition to the λ4554 barium line, some other characteristics of the group were two enhanced strontium (SR II) lines, at λ4077 and another at λ4215 blended with the head of the CN band, and also an enhanced G band due to CH and possibly CN. There are some supergiant stars with these BA II, strontium lines and CN band, but the G and K-type stars Bidelman and Keenan described did not appear to be supergiants.

G, K, and M-type giants, the most complex area of the Hertzsprung–Russell diagram (HR) diagram, have spectra so complicated "many astronomers have shied away from studying them".

A star follows a pattern as it ages that depends on its mass at the beginning. Here, a chart depicting temperature and luminosity shows how a star five times the mass of the Sun changes from a main sequence star into a white dwarf and a planetary nebula.

Eventually, Robert McClure discovered that essentially all barium stars began with a companion star that made the s-process elements, and when the companion star aged into a white dwarf, a stellar wind moved what was made by one star to the other star, a shifting of mass from an Asymptotic giant branch(AGB) star that turned into a white dwarf, to its companion star.

Bidelman was the first to find three unusual A- and F-type high-latitude bright stars, HR 6144, 89 Herculis, and HD 161796 in the high galactic plane, an unexpected place for supergiant stars to be found.

Astronomers expect to find massive young stars that are five to twenty times the mass of the Sun, on the galactic plane, a place where stars form, but it is rare to find stars like Her 89, with a spectrum that appears to be a young supergiant so far from the Galactic plane. Regarding these stars with characteristics of Population I supergiants, yet found at high galactic latitude, another astronomer wrote, "If I were a theoretician, I would simply say, 'They can't be, therefore they aren't'".

Bidelman's 1951 study also isolated the G- and K-type giant stars with weak G-bands as a class of peculiar giants.

=== University of California, Lick Observatory (1953–1963) ===
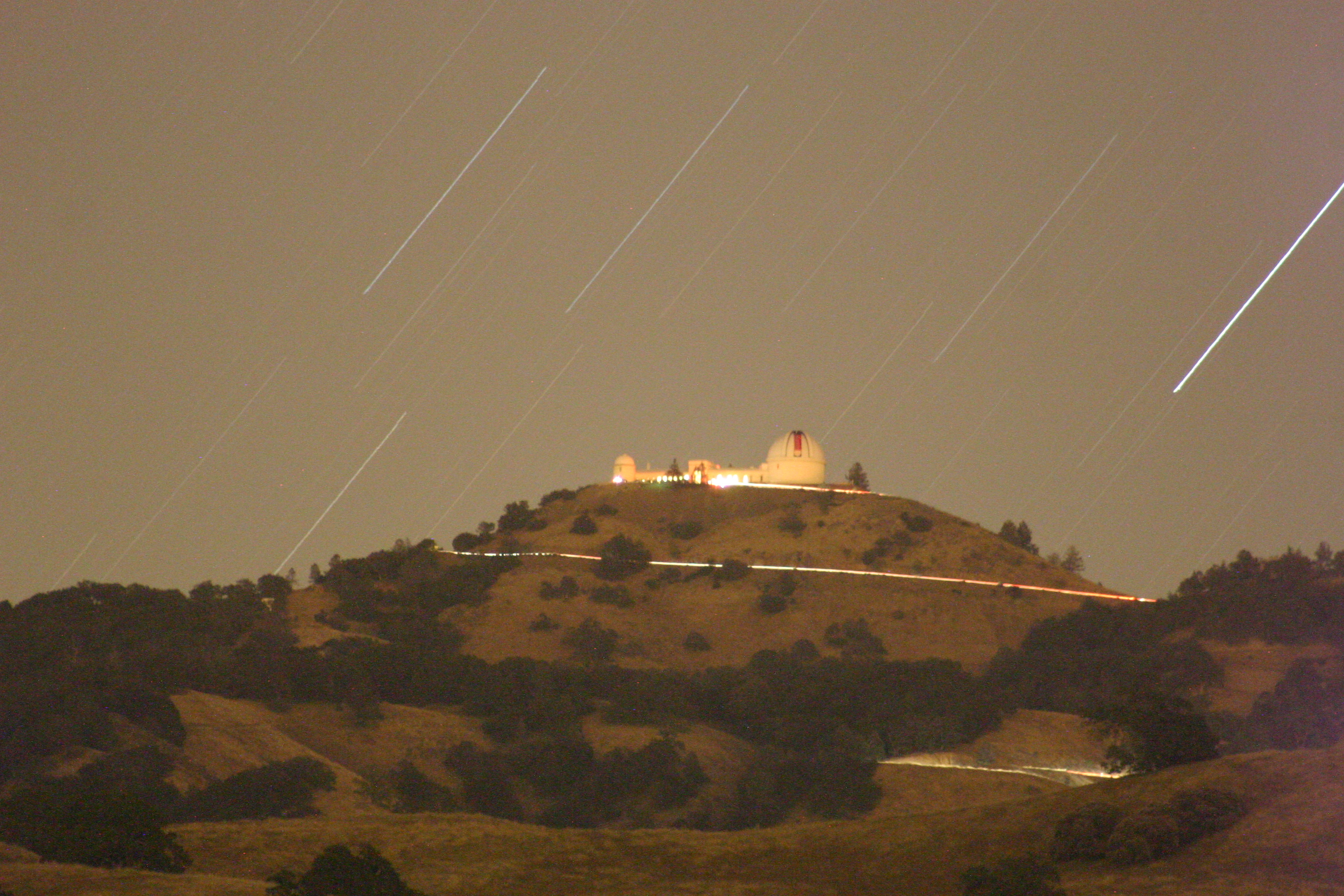
Lick Observatory was the first permanently occupied observatory built on a mountain. The night sky over Mount Hamilton displays star trails due to the Earth's rotation.

In October 1953, Bidelman was hired as an assistant astronomer at Lick Observatory. This observatory of the University of California is located on Mount Hamilton (California). The Bidelman family lived on Mount Hamilton and the children attended a one-room school where it was an hour's drive to the nearest grocery store. According to Stanislaus Vasilevskis, due to the lack of a high school for children and other features, Bidelman moved from Mount Hamilton to San Jose, and commuted to work.

Otto Struve had left the Chicago for The University of California in 1950. Bidelman lectured for Struve's Graduate Seminar on Astrophysics at Berkeley in 1955. He and George Herbig also gave ten lectures together on stellar spectroscopy at Berkeley during the 1954–55 academic year. Bidelman served on the program committee for the American Association for the Advancement of Science and Astronomical Society of the Pacific meeting in 1955.

In 1953, Bidelman was the first to describe the hydrogen–deficient carbon star group, although Hans Ludendorff had found the appearance of weak hydrogen in R CrB in 1906.

In 1951, Bidelman informed other astronomers of his intentions to publish a catalogue with data for all known emission-line stars and requested they contribute data to be incorporated into it. He researched emission-line stars for his catalogue and bibliography at Yerkes Observatory (Wisconsin) and McDonald Observatory (Texas), and spent six weeks during the summer at the Mount Wilson and Palomar observatories (California), funded by the Department of Naval Research. While at Yerkes, Morgan, Strömgren, and Chandrasekhar had encouraged Bidelman to prepare such a catalogue, and his catalogue and bibliography of 1,640 middle and late-type emission-line stars was among the ten most-cited papers in astronomy in 1954. Bidelman's catalogue included many stars with Ca II H and K emission. In 1996, Helmut Abt researched which papers published in 1954 were cited most frequently from 1955 to 1995, and Bidelman's Catalog and Bibliography ranked among the top four. (Note: Abt (1996) ranked Bidelman's paper fourth, because with 153 citations it had tied for third place with a paper by Walter Baade, and the two authors were listed alphabetically.)

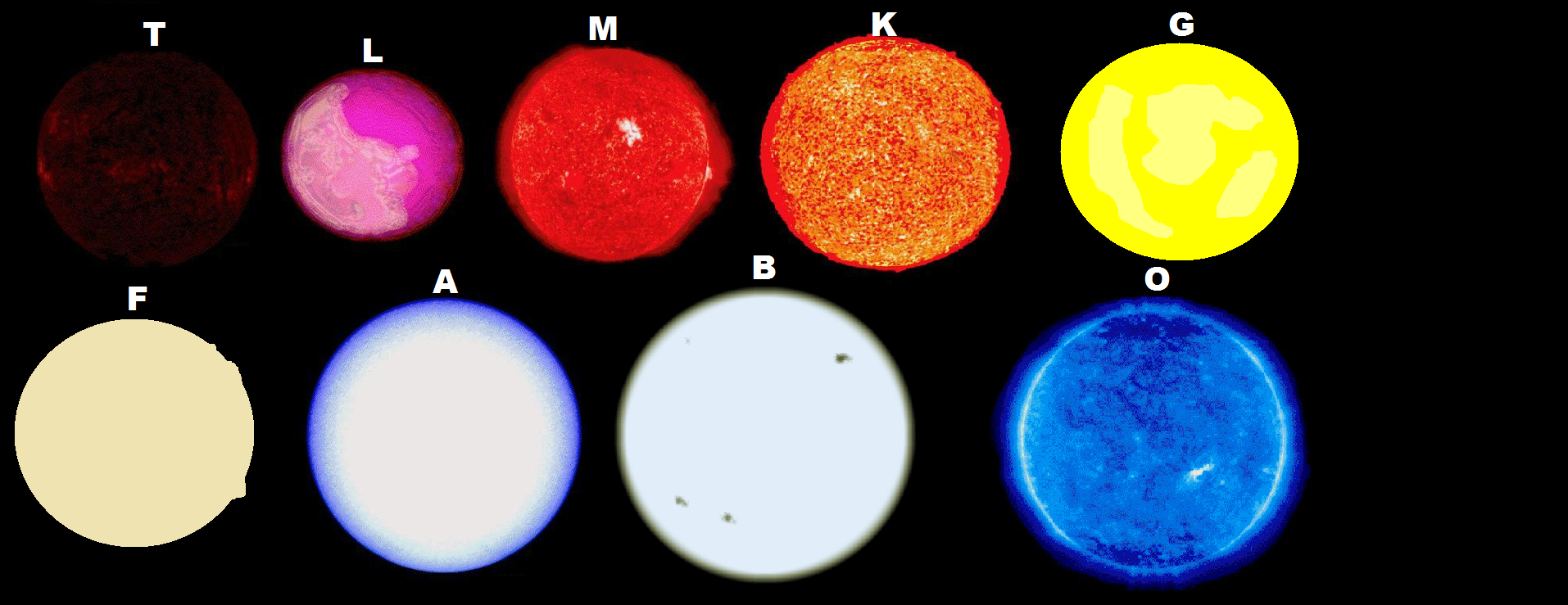
Stars vary from the relatively hot O and B-type stars to the relatively cooler and reddish M stars.

Bidelman served on the Astronomical Society of the Pacific's Nominating Committee and Publications Committees in 1955. When Seth B. Nicholson, Chairman of the Publications Committee for thirteen years retired, he nominated Bidelman as the next chairman. Bidelman resigned from the Nominating Committee, and became the Editor of the Publications of the Astronomical Society of the Pacific. the scientific journal of the ASP, which gives the Bruce Gold Medal.

In 1957, the Directors discussed but did not act on making the editor a salaried position. In 1958, the Publications Committee published over 100 papers, over 20 book reviews, and two symposia. Re-elected to the Board of Directors, Bidelman was authorized to spend up to $1,000 for editorial assistance in 1959, (Note: $1,000 in 1959 is estimated to be equivalent in buying power to $8,410.07 in 2017 by US Inflation Calculator. Retrieved June 22, 2017.) and they published over 90 papers from ~38 institutions, 15 book reviews and a symposium. His report noted it was a time-consuming task, made more difficult because he had been out of the country for two months that year. in 1960, they published six issues including 100 papers from ten countries, other articles and book reviews, and fulfilled reprint orders.

He was Third Vice President of ASP in 1961, and they published six issues totaling 543 pages, including 100 articles from the United States and nine other countries, and other papers. Bidelman's annual report said being "largely responsible for the welfare" of the journal for approximately five years had been a considerable burden and having found it impossible to find a sufficiently competent technical assistant on Mount Hamilton and not being able to fulfill his obligations to both the university and to ASP, he requested to resign effective July 1, 1961, He was re-elected to the board of directors. his resignation became effective in mid-August and an assistant editor was added to the staff in September. Bidelman summarized his experiences in a 1989 talk entitled "A funny thing happened on the way to the Stanford Press - reminiscences of Five Years with the PASP".

In 1962, Bidelman helped Soviet astronomers edit a manuscript for English readers, He continued on the ASP Publications Committee, no longer as chair, in 1962, 1963, 1964, 1965, 1966, 1967, 1968, 1969, and 1970. (Note: Bidelman may have served on the Publications Committee longer, but no other reports have been found.) When Helmut Abt explored the number of reference errors in astronomy journal articles in 1992, he said the only astronomical editor he was aware of who checked every reference in his journal and found many errors "to which he called the author's attention—was William P. Bidelman when he edited these Publications". (Note: After examining 1009 references from an astronomy journal, Abt found more than 12% contained reference errors.)

While he was editor, Bidelman was the general supervisor of the students at Lick Observatory. According to Hyron Spinrad, Bidelman encouraged astronomy students at the Berkeley campus to make observations at Lick Observatory. Spinrad recalled: "I don't know how he was regarded on Mt. Hamilton, but at Berkeley he was regarded as sort of a good will emissary from the mountain".

In March 1962, Bidelman used three peculiar stars, 3 Centauri, κ Cancri and 112 Herculis, to make the first certain identification of the rare element gallium II (Ga II) in stellar spectra, with lab work assistance by Charles H. Corliss at the National Bureau of Standards, which they reported in May 1962.

T Tauri, the prototype of the T-Tauri stars, is a young star found in the constellation Taurus. In November 1962, Bidelman found ~100 times more gallium I in the spectrum of T Tauri than is found in the spectrum of the sun. Bidelman noted that it was at present "impossible to explain these abundance anomalies in terms of known nucleogenesis patterns".

=== University of Michigan (1963–1969) ===
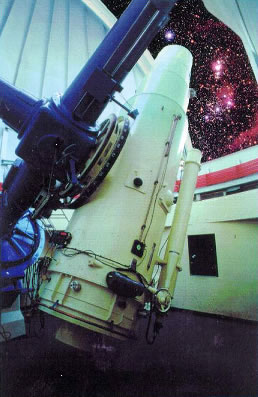
The Schmidt telescope is a camera that can photograph large areas. Bidelman helped move this Schmidt to South America, then later used it for an all-sky study of the southern hemisphere.

Bidelman became a Professor of Astronomy at the University of Michigan in Fall 1963.

At the University of Michigan, Freeman D. Miller and Bidelman began to direct the complete reactivation of the Curtis Schmidt telescope, to search for stars with spectra that showed unusual chemical compositions. After the University of Michigan agreed in 1966 to transfer the telescope to South America, the telescope was moved to the Cerro Tololo Inter-American Observatory (CTIO) in Chile, for astronomical viewing in the Southern Hemisphere which was completed in 1967. Under a National Science Foundation grant to Bidelman, Darrell Jack MacConnell moved the telescope, and the two later conducted research using objective-prism plates taken with by the Curtis Schmidt.

In the early 1960s Bidelman gave a colloquium at Case Western Reserve University in Cleveland, Ohio, where Bidelman suggested it would be feasible to reclassify all stars listed in the Henry Draper Catalogue on the MK system. Graduate student, Nancy Houk heard Bidelman's colloquium and became interested in classifying. Only about 23,000 of the HD stars had Morgan-Keenan classifications, and those had been classified by different people using different standards and sometimes chosen out of interest, creating a biased sample.

Reclassifying all HD stars the same way would create a vast data set that could be used as a teaching data set for a computer to encourage automated classifications which would be as better telescopes looked at for fainter stars. Houk eventually led the Michigan Survey and because it was anticipated that the work which she began in 1970 would not be completed until 2004, Bidelman used the same Curtis Schmidt objective-prism lens plates to begin an "early results" program. Bidelman recalled:

Even though I was on record as having thought it 'feasible' to reclassify all of the Henry Draper Catalogue stars, I myself had no intention of doing this, nor had Dr. MacConnell. But what we did do, to begin utilization of the beautiful plates that kept coming, was to start a so-called 'early-result' program in which we, assisted by several gifted graduate students, scanned the plates for all peculiar stars, supergiants, and late-type dwarfs. The previously unrecognized objects were then published.

By 1964, Bidelman reported finding ~150 peculiar stars, about 80% were believed to be new discoveries. In 1966, Bidelman reported finding Praseodymium III in χ Lupi and with the Curtis Schmidt telescope, Bidelman and Robert Victor made provisional identifications of 23 peculiar stars including 3 new metallic line stars. By 1969, Bidelman and his assistants discovered ~90 new, mainly F- and G-type supergiant stars, 33 new B-type emission (Be) stars, ~75 new metallic-line stars, over 150 new peculiar A-type stars, and other astronomical objects of interest.

With the help of MacConnell and research assistants Bond, Frye and Humphreys, Bidelman discovered 53 new Barium (Ba II) stars, 26 new late-type giants which had strong Ca II emission lines, new supergiants of various spectral classes and G- and K-type stars with very weak CH absorption in their spectra.

The first worldwide milestone in creating one or more astronomical data centers was the first discussion in 1966 at a National Science Foundation event in Maryland. The second was when Bidelman was president of the International Astronomical Union's Commission 45 and they discussed the issue at the 1967 IAU meeting in Prague Czechoslovakia. At this meeting in Prague: "W.P. Bidelman spoke of the need for a general reference catalogue giving full bibliographic data for individual stars". Bidelman said it would include about a million stars and require the resources of an organization like NASA, and some members of the Commission supported the proposal.

=== The University of Texas at Austin (1969–1970) ===
In 1969, Bidelman was a professor in the astronomy department at Austin. By the end of the 1960s, astronomers had begun to discuss the possibility of creating astronomical data centers. In a letter in 1969, Luboš Perek wrote that an astronomer who wanted a star's MK classification might search through 5 to 100 papers "according to his temperament" then give up, or take a plate to determine the type, or choose another star. Astronomers might observe the same star under different names. Catalogs, though useful, were often created as personal endeavors by astronomers near retirement and usually published only once, and while astronomical data increased rapidly, there were few making catalogs. In 1969, Bidelman became one of the six astronomers funded by the Astronomical Society of the Pacific to study the feasibility of a computerized data center.

The Observatory housing the Otto Struve Telescope at McDonald Observatory, Texas.

In 1970, the first official IAU debate on astronomical data centers took place. After a temporary IAU working group held meetings, and representatives from 16 countries showed interest, the IAU established the first permanent Working Group on Numerical Data, and Bidelman became one of its "main data center leaders" to plan centers to make data more reliable and accessible. Their first goal was to distribute information on existing Data Centers as well as lists of data errors. The Strasbourg Astronomical Data Center, NASA Astrophysics Data System, and data centers in Japan and by the Astronomical Council of the USSR Academy of Science were among the first centers developed, and said many goals in creating data centers were eventually met and, as A. Heck noted, "sometimes largely facilitated by not-so-quickly-expected technologies such as the electronic networking of the planet".

While at Austin in 1970, Bidelman, MacConnell and Frye published findings on six new stars showing strong neutral helium lines whose spectra appeared different from other "hydrogen deficient" stars, on objective prism plates from Cerro Tololo, Chile.

By the end of the school year, Bidelman resigned to accept the position of Director of the Warner and Swasey Observatory and Chairman of Astronomy at Case Western Reserve University (CWRU) in Ohio.

=== Case Western Reserve University (1970–2011) ===
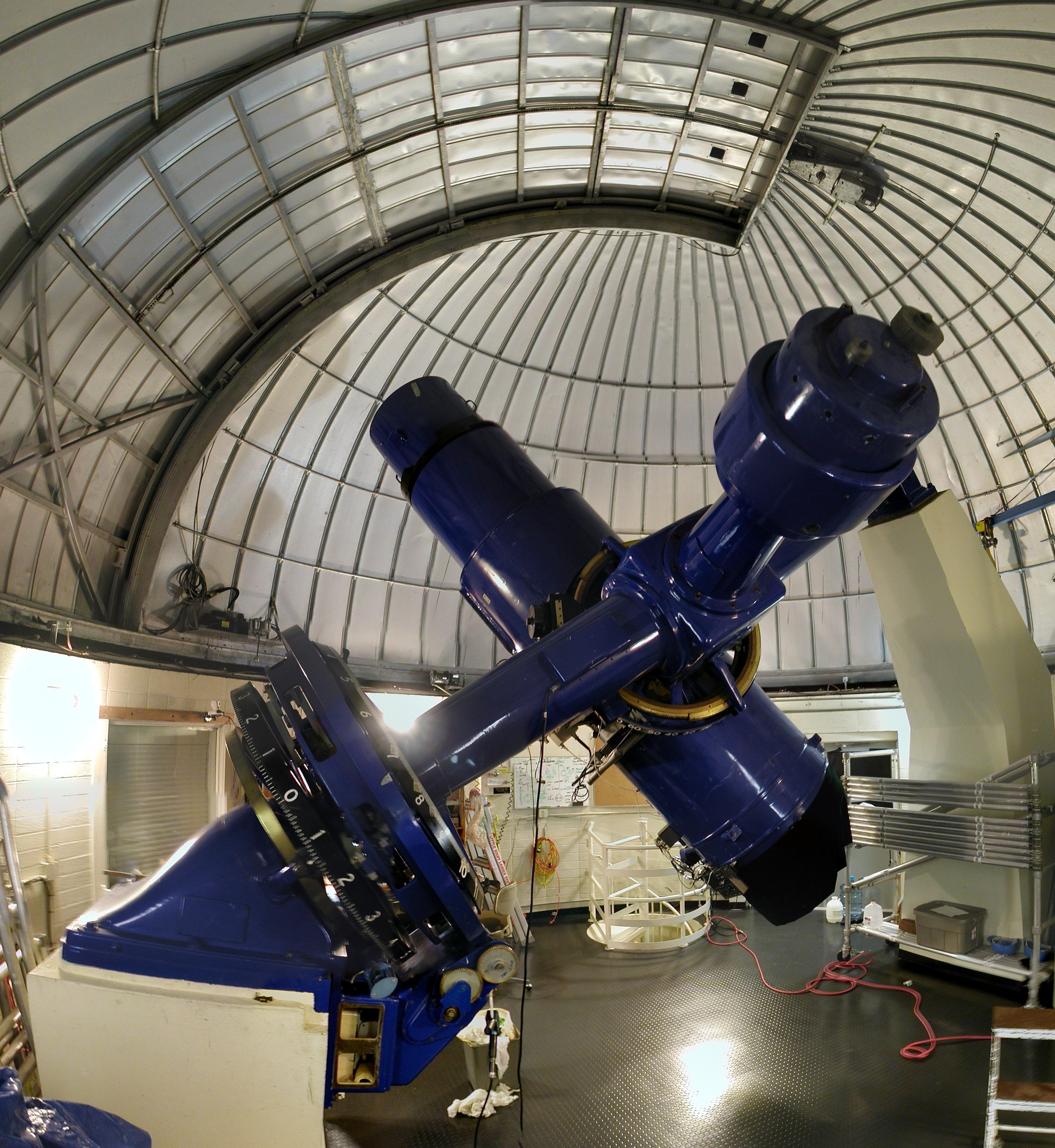
Moving the Burrell Schmidt to Kitt Peak in Arizona made it possible to continue the "early results" program to the Northern Celestial Hemisphere.

Bidelman directed the Warner and Swasey Observatory from 1970 to 1975, and was a professor of astronomy from 1970 to 1986. In June 1970, Bidelman began as chairman and Director. Bidelman's office was at the old Taylor Road Observatory, given to the university by the Warner & Swasey Company in 1920. Due to light pollution from the city of Cleveland, by the 1950s viewing was difficult and the Burrell Schmidt telescope was relocated ~30 miles away to Geauga County.

In 1973, Bidelman and MacConnell provided data on a variety of B-emission (Be) and shell stars, peculiar stars, weak-metal stars and other bright stars of the southern hemisphere, covering ~81% of the southern sky. They said when completed, Houk's more comprehensive study would "provide spectral date of inestimable value to stellar astronomers" and should supersede their report, but they did it as an "early result" study. Using CTIO objective –prism plates they found nearly 800 previously unknown A-type peculiar stars. They also found 34 weak G-band giants stars in the southern hemisphere. Their study was called a "major contribution" in providing data to help identify the relatively rare Population II stars. It created an unbiased sample, and doubled the number of known peculiar A-type (Ap) stars. After nineteen years of study by various investigators, in 2014, Beers et al. studied 302 of the Bidelman-MacConnell possible weak-metal stars and concluded that a metal-weak thick disk (MWTD) is present in the Milky Way galaxy, and noted its importance in understanding the development of our galaxy.

In 1962 and 1966, Bidelman had reported that the wavelength of λ 3984 varied somewhat from star to star, and stated differences in the ratios of mercury isotopes could be the reason. Bidelman was the first to note this, and in 1974, Michaud, Reeves and Charland, considering the isotopic abundances to be real, and that Hg was in fact overabundant and not an artifact of blending, suggested the mercury overabundances were due to radiation pressure that caused the element to pile up until radiation and gravitational forces almost cancelled each other, then its isotopes would separate, sorting themselves. Michaud suggested that element segregation would proceed naturally due to gravitational settling and radiation pressure if the stellar atmosphere was steady.

The movement that is intrinsic to a star, or part of its "property", is called the "proper motion" of a star.

In 1975, Bidelman and San-Gak Lee reported spectral classifications for 601 proper-motion stars that had been listed in both a Lowell Observatory survey under Henry L. Giclas, and the Luyten Two-Tenths Catalogue and supplement, and their report included data from Gerard Kuiper. Kuiper and Bidelman had been at Yerkes Observatory at the same time.

For six years Kuiper had worked to classify ~3,200 high proper motion stars using ~9,000 spectra taken at Yerkes and McDonald, and with an added 300 spectra from Luyten, Kuiper had planned to publish the data with Luyten. Bidelman called it "very important spectroscopic work and a "large-scale assault" on the problem of unclassified proper motion stars.

Barnard's star (HIP 87937) is the highest proper motion star known. Stars of greater proper motion appear to move more greatly against the background of stars as seen from Earth, so proper motion can be used to help find stars located closer to our planet.

When Kuiper ran out of stars of large proper motion and parallax in a region of sky, he observed the planets and their moons "nicely lined up" in that region. When Kuiper found evidence of an atmosphere on Saturn's moon, Titan, his research changed focus and much of his data on proper motion stars remained unpublished. Kuiper died in 1973.

Following his paper with Lee, Bidelman had "renewed interest" in proper motion stars and asked whether Kuiper's unpublished proper motion material could be found. With help from the Kuiper Memorial Committee at the University of Arizona, Ewen A. Whitaker, Elizabeth Roemer, and Helmut Abt, Bidelman obtained copies of five of Kuiper's notebooks which had stars noted by name and right ascension without declination, and many with multiple spectra and more than one classification. Bidelman established a card file for every star or binary pair, and sought to find the exact star Kuiper observed. His goal was not to create definitive spectral types or change Kuiper's classifications, but to set out clearly "the enormous amount of useful spectral data relating to these objects gathered by an energetic and most talented astronomer to whom many, including the writer, owe much. This work represents a partial repayment of that debt". He estimated there could be ~1,000 stars with better spectral types than otherwise known. Bidelman worked on Kuiper's data. and published it in 1985.

In 1975, Peter Pesch replaced Bidelman as Director of the Observatory and Chairman of the Astronomy department. While Bidelman had been the observatory director, three of Bidelman's graduate students, Craig Chester, Cynthia Irvine, and William Smethells, were part of a group from CWRU who wanted to begin their own observatory. The outlook for employment in research astronomy was bleak, so the group began a mail-order business and took part-time jobs to solve their "food on the table problem" while seeking to build an observatory in California, and Bidelman gave them their first cash donation. Other donations followed, and the Monterey Institute for Research in Astronomy opened in 1984.

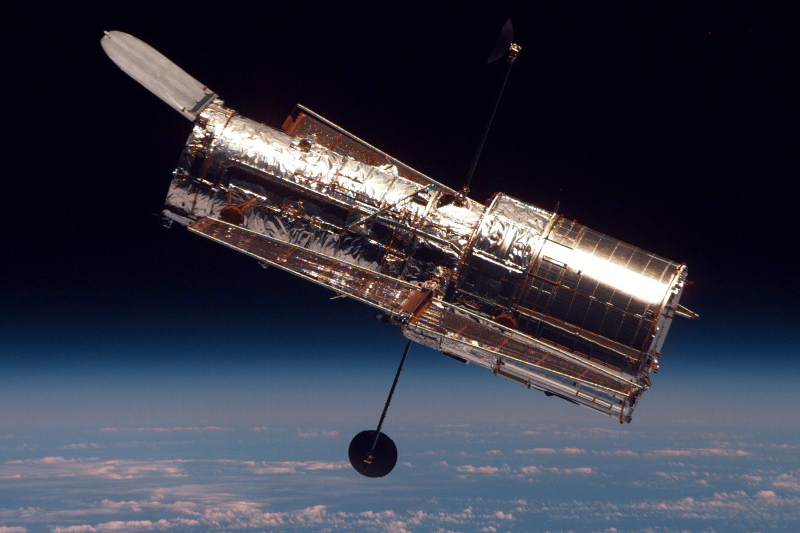
In 1977, Congress agreed to fund the orbiting Hubble Space Telescope, named after Edwin Hubble. In September 1977, Bidelman served on the Ad Hoc Advisory Subcommittee for NASA's Space Telescope.

In 1976, Bidelman headed an IAU working group on the proper designation for astronomical objects. At a 1978 symposium discussion following a paper Bidelman stated he wanted to make a slightly off-topic point about nomenclature, and asked whether the star under discussion, VI Cyg #5 is the same star as BD+40° 4220. Informed it is and another one of its names is V729 Cyg, (Note: According to its "Identifiers" area on SIMBAD, V729 Cyg has over 50 different names.) Bidelman responded, "Well, I'd like to say, as a member of an IAU Commission concerned with such things, that one should adopt a consistent labeling for a star". After being seconded by Underhill, he added: "We don't all have encyclopedic memories".

The Warner and Swasey Observatory in Cleveland, Ohio, suffered from light pollution, and was moved first to a better viewing site in Ohio, then later to Kitt Peak, Arizona, in 1979. By 1979, Houk had classified 69,000 southern stars. As she finished the southern classifications, Bidelman became responsible to oversee taking the northern plates at CWRU's new Kitt Peak observation site in Arizona. The Curtis Schmidt telescope that was used for the southern all-sky survey was a twin to the Burrell Schmidt used in the northern survey.

Bidelman also conducted research with infrared and ultraviolet data as they became available.

When the telescope at Kitt Peak became operational in 1981, Bidelman continued his "early-results" research involving "systematic, but nonetheless somewhat cursory inspection" to classify stars for the northern hemisphere that had been given HD numbers, and published the spectral data in 1983. Bidelman identified 175 peculiar or otherwise interesting stars, most thought to be new discoveries.

Bidelman was the first to identify the peculiar F str λ4077 dwarfs. As part of the "early results" program, in 1981, 1983 and 1985 Bidelman found 21 stars he identified as "F str λ 4077". Almost nothing was known about these stars other than Bidelman's spectral classification. Later researchers found evidence that about half are main-sequence counterparts of Barium stars.

Bidelman retired from teaching at Case Western in 1986. He became a Professor Emeritus, and in 1990 and 1991 continued to do research and remained active in the astronomy department. As a Professor Emeritus, Bidelman continued with the Henry Draper Reclassification project with Houk and the Michigan Spectral Survey and compiled identification of stars in the IRAS Low-Resolution Spectral Catalogue.

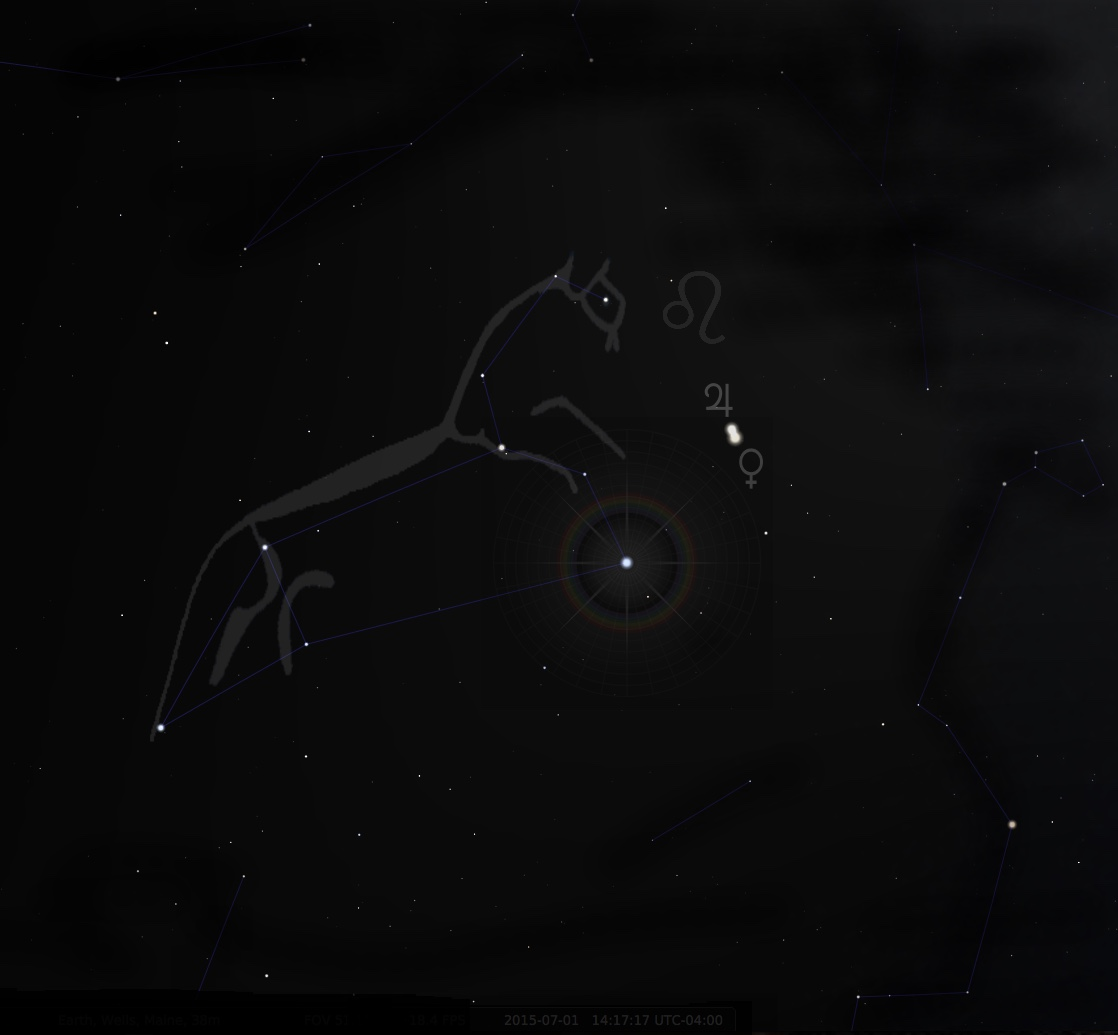
A close conjunction of Venus and Jupiter in Leo in July 2015 gave a suggestion of the conjunctions in 3 and 2 BC which Bidelman argued were a plausible explanation for the biblical Star of Bethlehem.

Bidelman became interested in the Star of Bethlehem and argued it was involved planetary conjunctions. In 1991, Bidelman used astronomical tables by Bryant Tuckerman and Jean Meeus to investigate Roger Sinnott's suggestion that two close conjunctions of Venus and Jupiter on the morning of August 12, 3 BC, and the evening of June 17, 2 BC, could explain the Star of Bethlehem. He found that for these two planets, an easily observable morning conjunction is "invariably followed" by an evening conjunction approximately ten months later whenever the morning conjunction has an elongation of at least 19°. Bidelman found 28 such pairs of Venus-Jupiter conjunctions in the ~100 years before the birth of Christ, although the 3 and 2 BC conjunctions appeared closer together. Bidelman noted that John Mosley has shown the August 3 BC morning conjunction was ~4.3 arcminutes, and the June 2 BC evening conjunction was an "extremely close" 0.5 arcminutes, and Bidelman considered some historical events to determine the date of Christ's birth, and noted these conjunctions took place in Leo, a constellation associated with Judaism and the Tribe of Judah. Bidelman suggested the conjunctions in 3 and 2 BC are a plausible explanation for the Star of Bethlehem.

In a brief 1991 Newsweek on Air interview about the Star of Bethlehem, when asked when and why he became interested in the topic, Bidelman said he had always been an astronomer, and it is of astronomical interest. When asked whether he thought his theory demystified Christmas, Bidelman replied:

Oh, I don't think so. If it is right that the astrologers saw in fact two conjunctions of Venus and Jupiter, one in 3 BC and one in 2 BC, I think perhaps it would make us feel that there was a little bit more reason for what is stated in the scriptures than we might otherwise think. It's somewhat fashionable to think that there's no scientific basic for this at all, and that is certainly, I think, an incorrect position to take.

In 1992, almost 50 years after his thesis paper, Bidelman stated On revient toujours à ses premières amours ("One always returns to his first loves") when he returned to the topic of his dissertation in 1992 and he considered it "perhaps worth mentioning" that two stars seen then had completely changed their spectral appearance.

In 1993, Bidelman provided data on 177 known and possible asymptotic giant branch stars, saying he was confident many would "prove to be interesting and important. Unfortunately, I don't know which ones!" Bidelman's list of high Strömgren c1 index high galactic latitude stars included promising post-AGB candidates to lead to finds of similar objects to better understand the post-AGB sub-groups of stars.

Invited to speak at the 1996 IAU Symposium on carbon stars Bidelman declined on advice from his doctor, but sent introductory comments in which he said:

I have always been fascinated by red stars, partly because they were easy to find in a telescope field, and partly also because they seemed to warm things up a bit on a cold winter night. Thus I early became acquainted with the celebrate carbon star 280 Schjellerup, better known as WZ Cassiopeiae, which was recognized about 100 years ago as an unusual member of a group of red stars then known as the stars of Secchi's fourth type.

Pointing out that observers sometimes "note things that don't seem to make much sense, but which later are realized to have been very significant indeed", he traced a brief history of "this stellar oddball" and concluded:

I hope you get my point: that if something seems a bit strange it is worth doing some serious thinking to try to make sense of it. At the very least, do tell others about it; though perhaps hard to believe, they may be smarter than you! This policy may not make you popular with the establishment but the risk is well worth taking.

In May 1998, the Case astronomy students and graduates held a 2-day "Kth" reunion to honor Bidelman and new retiree Peter Pesch.

Bidelman (1969) once said that the problem of the Ap stars (1969) is that "stars of unusual spectrum are doing unusual things". In 2002, Bidelman suggested the peculiar magnetic A stars may have once been close binaries that "merged and are now in the process of learning to live as single objects", and suggested in 2005 that Przybylski's Star may be one such object.

In Case Western University's 2008 astronomy department newsletter, Chair Heather Morrison wrote they were sorry to say goodbye to Professor Bidelman, who had turned 90 "and has decided to finish his distinguished career in Astronomy by retiring for a second time".

== Honors ==
Bidelman was elected to the American Astronomical Society in 1944. and was a member for over 65 years. He was president of the Cleveland Astronomical Society from 1973 to 1976. Bidelman was elected to the international science honor society Sigma Xi by Case Western Reserve University. The minor planet 9398 Bidelman (1994 SH3), discovered by the Arizona group Spacewatch at Kitt Peak on September 28, 1994, was named in his honor. It is an outer main belt asteroid. The peculiar supergiant star HD 30353 is named "Bidelman's star".

== Personal life ==
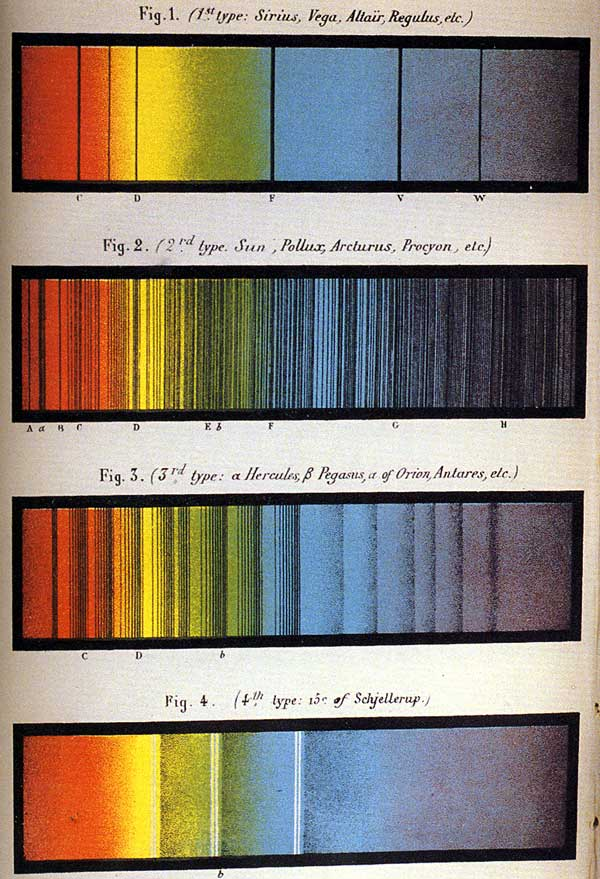
Bidelman wrote the section on Spectral Classification for the U.S. Navy's 1992 edition of The Explanatory Supplement to the Astronomical Almanac. In it he wrote, "The road from Secchi to Morgan and Keenan and beyond has been long and winding, and its end is still now only faintly glimpsed".

William Pendry Bidelman was born on September 25, in 1918 in Los Angeles, California. Bidelman's father, the son of Howard Bidelman and Julia Pendry, had the same name but Bidelman did not use the designation "Jr.," after college. His father died suddenly when he was four, and subsequently Bidelman moved with his mother to Grand Forks, North Dakota where his grandparents (Architect Joseph Bell DeRemer and his wife Elizabeth) raised him. As a boy, Bidelman wrote to Alfred H. Joy at Mount Wilson, to ask how to become an astronomer. They later served together on the Astronomical Society of the Pacific Publications Committee in 1955 and 1956. He met his future wife, Verna Shirk, in grade school and became "smitten" with her at age 10.

In a Grand Forks Central High School competition, Bidelman's tribute to North Dakota was judged best, and was read on October 20, 1935, at the Washington Memorial Chapel at Valley Forge, Pennsylvania, an annual event for essays by high school students about their states. In his essay, Bidelman praised North Dakota for its plains "covered with an ocean of wheat, rolling gently in the soft summer breezes", its rolling prairies, mighty rivers; International Peace Garden "in the heart of this continent", its industry, agriculture, and its "scores of untold secrets which have not been discovered to this day". He finished by quoting state poet James W. Foley, by writing: "North Dakota, hail to you!"

At a 1977 IAU Symposium honoring the memory of Henry Norris Russell, Bidelman recalled reading during his high school years the "fascinating and inspiring" monthly articles Russell wrote for Scientific American. Saying it was "an important part of my early scientific education", Bidelman suggested they might be worth reprinting.

Asked to make some remarks at that symposium, Bidelman said he had little personal knowledge of Russell, but could believe the comments he had heard that Russell was both a great scientist and a great human being, because he had found it to be true of most other influential astronomers. In addition to Alfred Joy, Bidelman recalled "with great pleasure" Bart Bok, Cecilia Payne-Gaposchkin and Martin Schwarzschild from Harvard, and "the whole motley Yerkes crew: Struve, Greenstein, Henyey, Chandrasekhar, Kuiper and all the rest", and stated he marveled at his youthful contacts with them and their passionate devotion to science and to life. He ended his speech by saying:

I suppose I am being provincial but I've always felt that astronomers on the whole are the best people on Earth. ... . Let us never forget, nor let our students forget, that of every million people on the face of the Earth, only one is an astronomer.

Among Bidelman's many interests were baseball, philately, music, and square dancing. His wife, Verna Pearl Shirk was born in 1918 in Grand Forks, North Dakota. She graduated from the University of North Dakota, and was a teacher and a poet who used her time for family, friends, and church work. The Bidelman's had four children, and also grandchildren and great-grandchildren. One daughter died in 2000, and Verna Bidelman died in 2009. They were married 69 years. Bidelman died at 92 on May 3, 2011, in Tennessee.

== Select bibliography ==
These journal articles are William P. Bidelman's five most-cited works on the NASA Astrophysics Data System as of July 2017.

- Bidelman, W. P.; MacConnel, D. J. (1973). "The brighter stars of astrophysical interest in the southern sky". The Astronomical Journal. 78: 687. Bibcode:1973AJ.....78..687B. doi:10.1086/111475.
- Kwok, S.; Volk, K.; Bidelman, W. P. (1997). "Classification and Identification of IRAS Sources with Low-Resolution Spectra". The Astrophysical Journal Supplement Series. 112 (2): 557. Bibcode:1997ApJS..112..557K. doi:10.1086/313038.
- Bidelman, W. P. (1954). "Catalogue and Bibliography of Emission-Line Stars of Types Later than B". The Astrophysical Journal Supplement Series. 1: 175. Bibcode:1954ApJS....1..175B. doi:10.1086/190007.
- Bidelman, W. P.; Keenan, P. C. (1951). "The Ba II Stars". The Astrophysical Journal. 114: 473. Bibcode:1951ApJ...114..473B. doi:10.1086/145488.
- Bidelman, W. P. (1951). "Spectral Classification of Stars Listed in Miss Payne's Catalogue of c Stars". The Astrophysical Journal. 113: 304. Bibcode:1951ApJ...113..304B. doi:10.1086/145399.

== Gallery ==
Stars studied by Bidelman

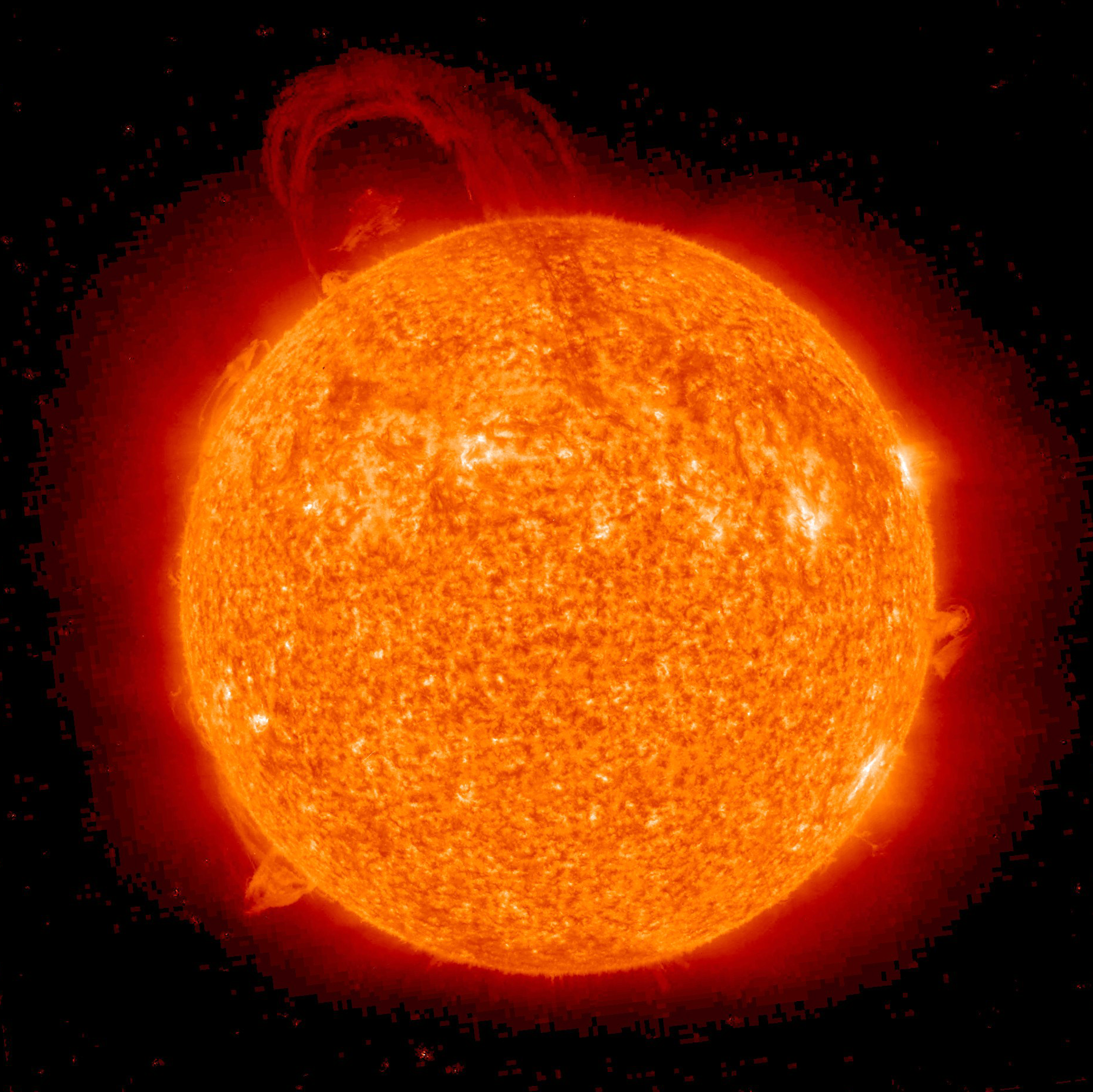
One of Bidelman's early studies was on the Sun.

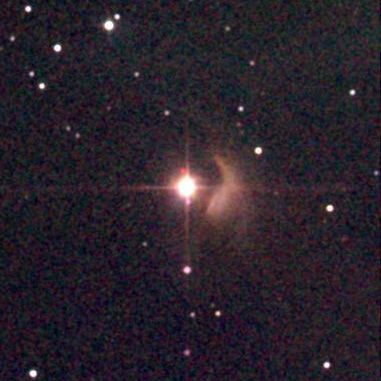
When Bidelman studied T Tauri, the prototype of young stars, he found it had 100 times the element gallium found in the Sun.

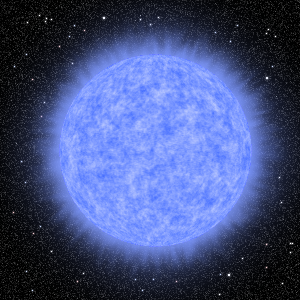
A luminous blue variable (LBV). This is the star Zeta puppis.

The red supergiant VV Cephei stars were defined as a class by Bidelman in 1954. In this artist's conception to give an idea of size, the Sun is the small dot on the left.

== See also ==
- Peculiar stars
- Stellar classification
- Spectral atlas
- Monterey Institute for Research in Astronomy
