= Bidelman's Star =

Bidelman's Star may refer to one of three stars, all named after William P. Bidelman.

- Bidelman's helium variable star is HD 125823
- Bidelman's peculiar star is KS Persei (HD 30353)
- Bidelman's high-latitude Be star is HD 127617
