= HR 1884 =

Binary star system in the constellation Auriga

- Location of HR 1884 (circled)

Observation data Epoch J2000.0 Equinox ICRS
- Constellation: Auriga
- Right ascension: 05^{h} 36^{m} 52.41603^{s}
- Declination: +40° 10′ 56.5705″
- Apparent magnitude (V): 6.08

Characteristics
- Spectral type: G3 Ib + B7 V?
- Apparent magnitude (G): 5.8
- U−B color index: 0.69
- B−V color index: 1.03

Astrometry
Radial velocity (R_{v})	−12.06±0.03 km/s
Proper motion (μ)	RA: −3.022±0.048 mas/yr Dec.: −2.600±0.035 mas/yr
Parallax (π)	2.0195±0.0476 mas
Distance	1,620 ± 40 ly (500 ± 10 pc)
Absolute magnitude (M_{V})	−2.79

Orbit
Period (P)	7829.3±1.4 days
Eccentricity (e)	0.8867±0.0006
Periastron epoch (T)	54417.21±0.22
Argument of periastron (ω) (secondary)	250.61±0.20°
Semi-amplitude (K_{1}) (primary)	21.77±0.04 km/s

Details
Radius	45.78+2.89 −3.69 R_{☉}
Luminosity	1,094±43 L_{☉}
Surface gravity (log g)	1.78 cgs
Temperature	4,907+210 −149 K
Metallicity [Fe/H]	+0.04 dex
Rotational velocity (v sin i)	6.2 km/s

Other designations
- BD+40°1346, HD 36891, HIP 26363, SAO 40481, Gaia DR3 191167349378062592

Database references
SIMBAD	data

HR 1884 is a spectroscopic binary star in the constellation Auriga. The primary is a G type supergiant star while the secondary is probably a B type main sequence star.

The possible spectroscopic binary nature of the star was first noted in 1983 by Gilbert Burki and Michel Mayor in a paper on the rate of binaries among supergiant stars. In the same year, William P. Bidelman noted that the stellar spectrum was composite indicating a companion star. Confirmation of spectroscopic binary status and a preliminary orbit was published in 1998 by R. Paul Butler, a much more accurate orbit was published in 2015 by Roger Griffin.
