= For Your Ears Only =

For Your Ears Only may refer to:

- For Your Ears Only (album), a 2000 album by Bentley Rhythm Ace
- For Your Ears Only (radio program), an American news radio program
