= Arcturus =

Brightest star in the constellation Boötes

- Arcturus (circled) in the constellation of Boötes

Observation data Epoch J2000 Equinox ICRS
- Constellation: Boötes
- Pronunciation: /ɑːrkˈtjʊərəs/
- Right ascension: 14^{h} 15^{m} 39.7^{s}
- Declination: +19° 10′ 56″
- Apparent magnitude (V): −0.05

Characteristics
- Evolutionary stage: Red giant branch
- Spectral type: K1.5 III Fe−0.5
- Apparent magnitude (J): −2.25
- U−B color index: +1.28
- B−V color index: +1.23
- R−I color index: +0.65

Astrometry
Radial velocity (R_{v})	−5.19 km/s
Proper motion (μ)	RA: −1093.45 mas/yr Dec.: −1999.40 mas/yr
Parallax (π)	88.83±0.54 mas
Distance	36.7 ± 0.2 ly (11.26 ± 0.07 pc)
Absolute magnitude (M_{V})	−0.30±0.02

Details
Mass	1.08±0.06 M_{☉}
Radius	25.4±0.2 R_{☉}
Luminosity	170 L_{☉}
Surface gravity (log g)	1.66±0.05 cgs
Temperature	4,286±30 K
Metallicity [Fe/H]	−0.52±0.04 dex
Rotation	2.0±0.2 years
Rotational velocity (v sin i)	2.4±1.0 km/s
Age	7.1+1.5 −1.2 Gyr

Other designations
- Arcturus, Svati, Hōkūleʻa, α Boötis, Alpha Boo, α Boo, 16 Boötis, BD+19°2777, GJ 541, HD 124897, HIP 69673, HR 5340, SAO 100944, LHS 48, PLX 3242.00

Database references
SIMBAD	data

Arcturus is a red giant star in the northern constellation of Boötes, and the brightest star in the constellation. It has the Bayer designation α Boötis, which is Latinized to Alpha Boötis and abbreviated Alpha Boo or α Boo. With an apparent visual magnitude of −0.05, it is the fourth-brightest star in the night sky and the brightest in the northern celestial hemisphere. Arcturus forms one corner of the Spring Triangle asterism.

Located relatively close at 36.7 light-years from the Sun, Arcturus is a red giant of spectral type K1.5III—an aging star around 7.1 billion years old that has used up its core hydrogen and evolved off the main sequence. It is about the same mass as the Sun, but has expanded to 25 times its size (around 35 million kilometers) and is around 170 times as luminous.

== Nomenclature ==
The traditional name Arcturus is Latinised from the ancient Greek Ἀρκτοῦρος (Arktouros) and means "Guardian of the Bear", ultimately from ἄρκτος (arktos), 'bear' and οὖρος (ouros), 'watcher, guardian'. As ἄρκτος also came to mean "north", the name can also translate to "Guardian of the North".

The designation of Arcturus as α Boötis (Latinised to Alpha Boötis) was made by Johann Bayer in 1603. In 2016, the International Astronomical Union organized a Working Group on Star Names (WGSN) to catalog and standardize proper names for stars. The WGSN's first bulletin of July 2016 included a table of the first two batches of names approved by the WGSN, which included Arcturus for α Boötis.

== Observational history ==
Arcturus and its distinctive red color have been mentioned since antiquity and medieval times; Ptolemy described it as subrufa ("slightly red"), and Geoffrey Chaucer referred to it as Alramih in A Treatise on the Astrolabe (1391).

In 1635, the French mathematician and astronomer Jean-Baptiste Morin observed Arcturus in the daytime with a telescope. This was the first recorded full daylight viewing for any star other than the Sun and supernovae.

== Observation ==
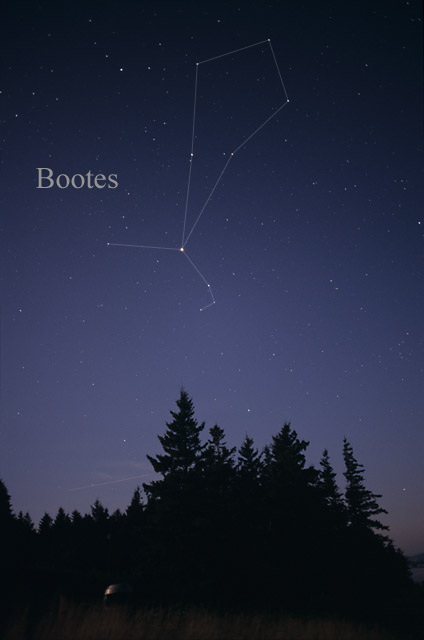
Arcturus is the brightest star in the constellation of Boötes.

With an apparent visual magnitude of −0.05, Arcturus is the brightest star in the northern celestial hemisphere and the fourth-brightest star in the night sky, after Sirius (−1.46 apparent magnitude), Canopus (−0.72) and α Centauri (combined magnitude of −0.27). However, α Centauri AB is a binary star, whose components are each fainter than Arcturus. This makes Arcturus the third-brightest individual star, just ahead of α Centauri A (officially named Rigil Kentaurus), whose apparent magnitude is −0.01. Arcturus has been seen at or just before sunset with the naked eye.

Arcturus is visible from both of Earth's hemispheres as it is located 19° north of the celestial equator. The star culminates at midnight on April 27, and at 9 p.m. on June 10 being visible during the late northern spring or the southern autumn. From the Northern Hemisphere, an easy way to find Arcturus is to follow the arc of the handle of the Big Dipper (or Plough in the UK). By continuing in this path, one can find Spica, "Arc to Arcturus, then spike (or speed on) to Spica". Together with the bright stars Spica and Regulus (or Denebola, depending on the source), Arcturus is part of the Spring Triangle asterism. With Cor Caroli, these four stars form the Great Diamond asterism.

Arcturus has a B-V color index of +1.23, roughly midway between Pollux (B-V +1.00) and Aldebaran (B-V +1.54).

η Boötis, or Muphrid, is only 3.3 light-years distant from Arcturus, and would have a visual magnitude −2.5, about as bright as Jupiter at its brightest from Earth, whereas an observer on the former system would find Arcturus with a magnitude −5.0, slightly brighter than Venus as seen from Earth, but with an orangish color.

== Physical characteristics ==
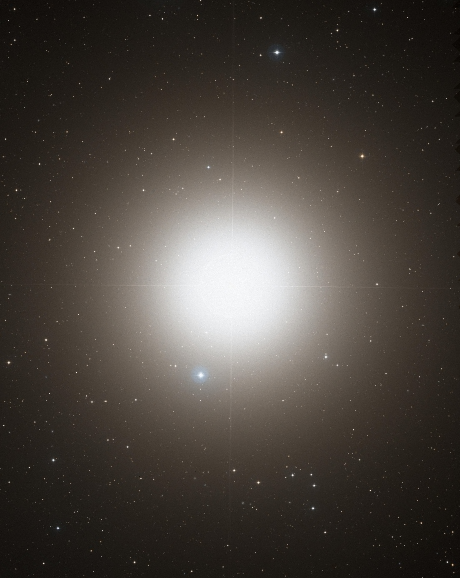
Optical image of Arcturus (DSS2 / MAST / STScI / NASA)

Based upon an annual parallax shift of 88.83 milliarcseconds, as measured by the Hipparcos satellite, Arcturus is 36.7 light-years (11.26 parsecs) from Earth. The parallax margin of error is 0.54 milliarcseconds, translating to a distance margin of error of ±0.23 light-years (0.069 parsecs). Because of its proximity, Arcturus has a high proper motion, about 228 arcseconds per century toward the southwest, greater than any first magnitude star other than α Centauri. Over 10,000 years, this carries it roughly 6° across the sky, enough to noticeably change its position relative to the other stars of Boötes. It is the second-closest giant star to Earth, after Pollux.

Arcturus is moving rapidly (122 km/s or 76 mi/s) relative to the Sun, and is now almost at its closest point to the Sun. Closest approach will happen in about 4,000 years, when the star will be a few hundredths of a light-year closer to Earth than it is today. (In antiquity, Arcturus was closer to the centre of the constellation.) Arcturus is thought to be an old-disk star, and appears to be moving with a group of 52 other such stars, known as the Arcturus stream.

With an absolute magnitude of −0.30, Arcturus is, together with Vega and Sirius, one of the most luminous stars in the Sun's neighborhood. It is about 110 times brighter than the Sun in visible light wavelengths, but this underestimates its strength as much of the light it gives off is in the infrared; total (bolometric) power output is about 180 times that of the Sun. With a near-infrared J band magnitude of −2.2, only Betelgeuse (−2.9) and R Doradus (−2.6) are brighter. The lower output in visible light is due to a lower efficacy as the star has a lower surface temperature than the Sun.

There have been suggestions that Arcturus might be a member of a binary system with a faint, cool companion, but no companion has been directly detected. In the absence of a binary companion, the mass of Arcturus cannot be measured directly, but models suggest it is slightly greater than that of the Sun. Evolutionary matching to the observed physical parameters gives a mass of 1.08±0.06 M_{☉}, while the oxygen isotope ratio for a first dredge-up star gives a mass of 1.2 M_{☉}. The star, given its evolutionary state, is expected to have undergone significant mass loss in the past. The star displays magnetic activity that is heating the coronal structures, and it undergoes a solar-type magnetic cycle with a duration that is probably less than 14 years. A weak magnetic field has been detected in the photosphere with a strength of around half a gauss. The magnetic activity appears to lie along four latitudes and is rotationally modulated.

Arcturus is estimated to be around 6 to 8.5 billion years old, but there is some uncertainty about its evolutionary status. Based upon the color characteristics of Arcturus, it is currently ascending the red-giant branch and will continue to do so until it accumulates a large enough degenerate helium core to ignite the helium flash. It has likely exhausted the hydrogen from its core and is now in its active hydrogen shell burning phase. However, Charbonnel et al. (1998) placed it slightly above the horizontal branch, and suggested it has already completed the helium flash stage.

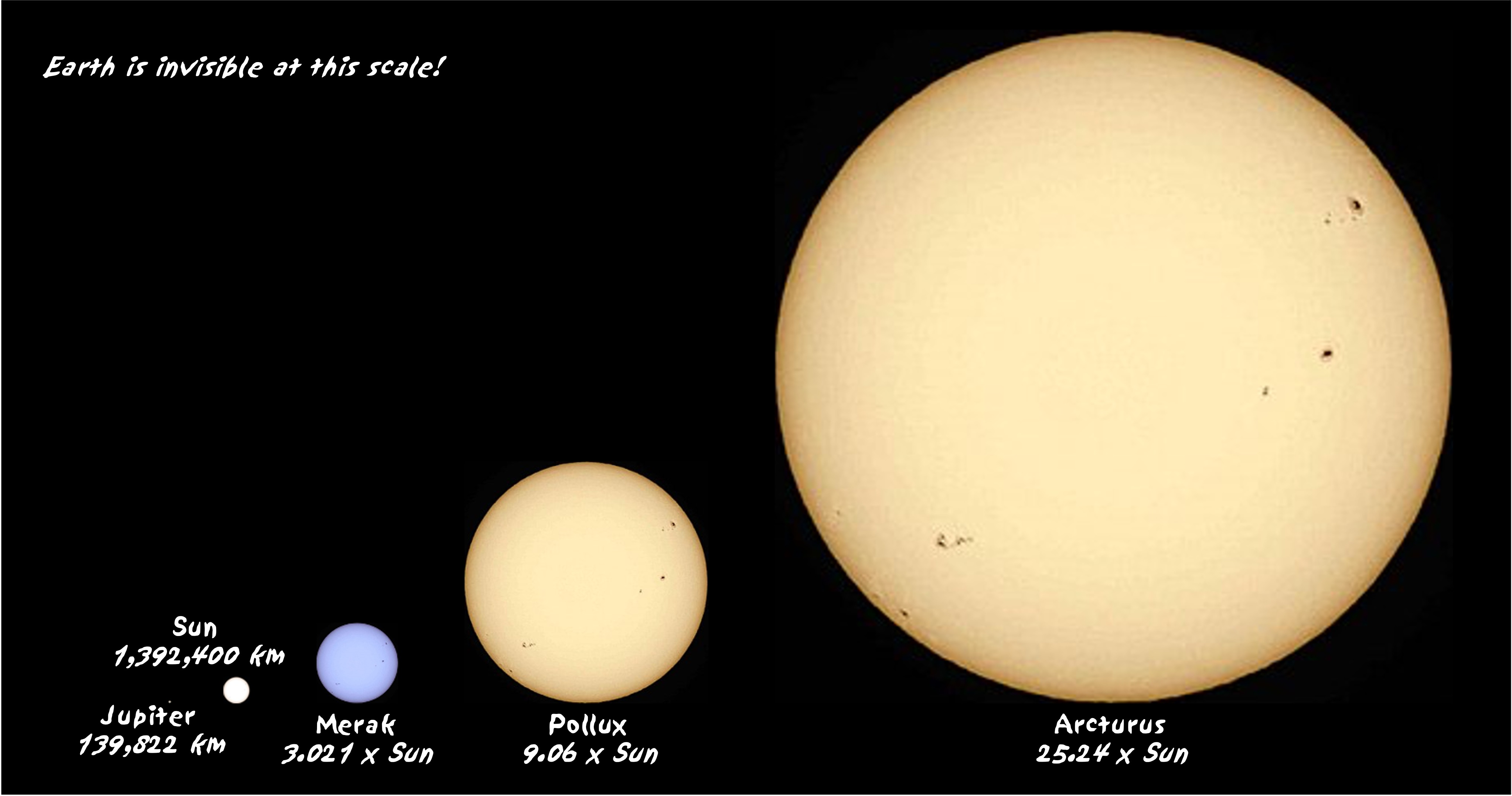
Size comparison between the Sun, Beta Ursae Majoris, Pollux, and Arcturus

=== Spectrum ===
Arcturus has evolved off the main sequence to the red giant branch, reaching an early K-type stellar classification. It is frequently assigned the spectral type of K0III, but in 1989 was used as the spectral standard for type K1.5III Fe−0.5, with the suffix notation indicating a mild underabundance of iron compared to typical stars of its type. As the brightest K-type giant in the sky, it has been the subject of multiple atlases with coverage from the ultraviolet to infrared.

The spectrum shows a dramatic transition from emission lines in the ultraviolet to atomic absorption lines in the visible range and molecular absorption lines in the infrared. This is due to the optical depth of the atmosphere varying with wavelength. The spectrum shows very strong absorption in some molecular lines that are not produced in the photosphere but in a surrounding shell. Examination of carbon monoxide lines show the molecular component of the atmosphere extending outward to 2–3 times the radius of the star, with the chromospheric wind steeply accelerating to 35–40 km/s in this region.

Astronomers term "metals" those elements with higher atomic numbers than helium. The atmosphere of Arcturus has an enrichment of alpha elements relative to iron but only about a third of solar metallicity. Arcturus is possibly a Population II star.

=== Oscillations ===
As one of the brightest stars in the sky, Arcturus has been the subject of a number of studies in the emerging field of asteroseismology. Belmonte and colleagues carried out a radial velocity (Doppler shift of spectral lines) study of the star in April and May 1988, which showed variability with a frequency of the order of a few microhertz (μHz), the highest peak corresponding to 4.3 μHz (2.7 days) with an amplitude of 60 ms^{−1}, with a frequency separation of c. 5 μHz. They suggested that the most plausible explanation for the variability of Arcturus is stellar oscillations.

Asteroseismological measurements allow direct calculation of the mass and radius, giving values of 0.8±0.2 M_{☉} and 27.9±3.4 R_{☉}. This form of modelling is still relatively inaccurate, but a useful check on other models.

=== Search for planets ===
Hipparcos satellite astrometry suggested that Arcturus is a binary star, with the companion about twenty times dimmer than the primary and orbiting close enough to be at the limits of resolution with current technology. Recent results remain inconclusive, but do support the marginal Hipparcos detection of a binary companion.

In 1993, radial velocity measurements of Aldebaran, Arcturus and Pollux showed that Arcturus exhibited a long-period radial velocity oscillation, which could be interpreted as a substellar companion. This substellar object would be nearly 12 times the mass of Jupiter and be located roughly at the same orbital distance from Arcturus as the Earth is from the Sun, at 1.1 astronomical units. However, all three stars surveyed showed similar oscillations yielding similar companion masses, and the authors concluded that the variation was likely to be intrinsic to the star rather than due to the gravitational effect of a companion. So far, no substellar companion has been confirmed.

== Mythology ==
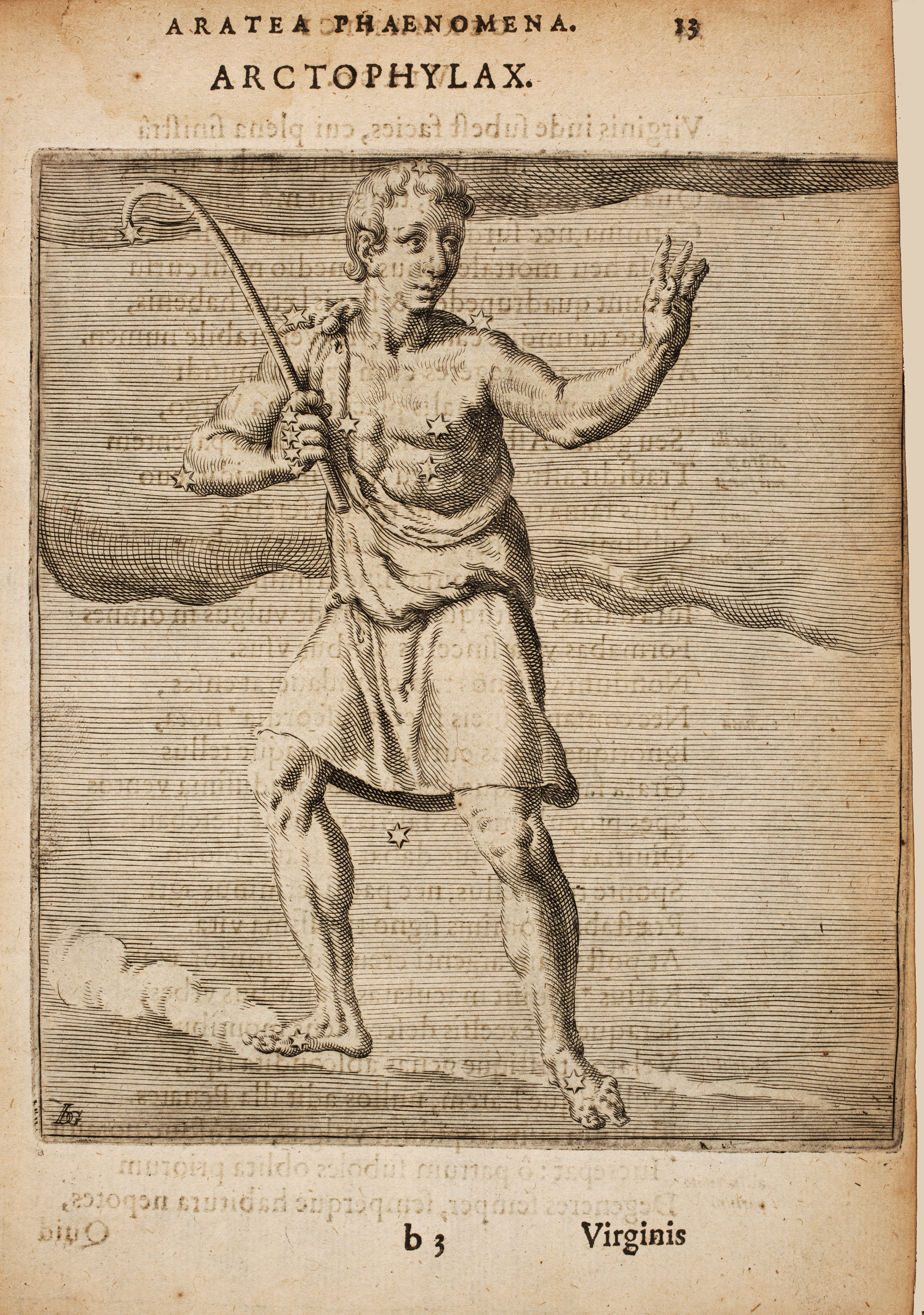
Arcturus in Arctophylax, seen between his knees

One astronomical tradition associates Arcturus with the mythology around Arcas, who was about to shoot and kill his own mother Callisto who had been transformed into a bear. Zeus averted their imminent tragic fate by transforming the boy into the constellation Boötes, called Arctophylax "bear guardian" by the Greeks, and his mother into Ursa Major (Greek: Arctos "the bear"). The account is given in Hyginus's Astronomy.

Aratus in his Phaenomena said that the star Arcturus lay below the belt of Arctophylax, and according to Ptolemy in the Almagest it lay between his thighs.

An alternative lore associates the name with the legend around Icarius, who gave the gift of wine to other men, but was murdered by them, because they had had no experience with intoxication and mistook the wine for poison. It is stated that Icarius became Arcturus while his dog, Maira, became Canicula (Procyon), although "Arcturus" here may be used in the sense of the constellation rather than the star.

== Cultural significance ==
As one of the brightest stars in the sky, Arcturus has been significant to observers since antiquity.

The Book of Job in the Hebrew Bible contains two mentions of Arcturus. It is mentioned alongside the constellations Orion and Pleiades (as well as other undetermined possible stellar bodies).

In ancient Mesopotamia, it was linked to the god Enlil, and also known as Shudun, "yoke", or SHU-PA of unknown derivation in the Three Stars Each Babylonian star catalogues and later MUL.APIN around 1100 BC.

In ancient Greece, the star is mentioned throughout astronomical literature. Arcturus is mentioned as early as the archaic period, notably in Hesiod's Work and Days, circa 700 BC, and later appears in the star catalogs of both Hipparchus in the Hellenistic period and Ptolemy in the Roman imperial era. The folk etymology connecting the star name with the bears (Greek: ἄρκτος, arktos) was probably invented much later and fell out of use in favour of Arabic names until it was revived in the Renaissance. In ancient Greek literature, Arcturus is often referenced as a seasonal marker, especially in relation to the autumn harvest of the Mediterranean world. This association is found in Hesiod (609–610), who writes: "when Orion and Sirius are come into mid-heaven, and rosy-finger dawn sees Arcturus [in September], then cut up all the grape clusters, Perses, and brings them home." In Laws (844e), a dialogue by Plato, "the rising of Arcturus" is synonymous with the autumn vintage of figs and grapes. It is also mentioned by Sophocles in the tragedy Oedipus Rex (1135–1137), again as a seasonal marker. The Corinthian messenger, revealed to be one of the shepherds who rescued the infant Oedipus in the wilderness of Cithaeron, says that he grazed his flock there "from spring until Arcturus" (ἐξ ἦρος εἰς ἀρκτοῦρον).

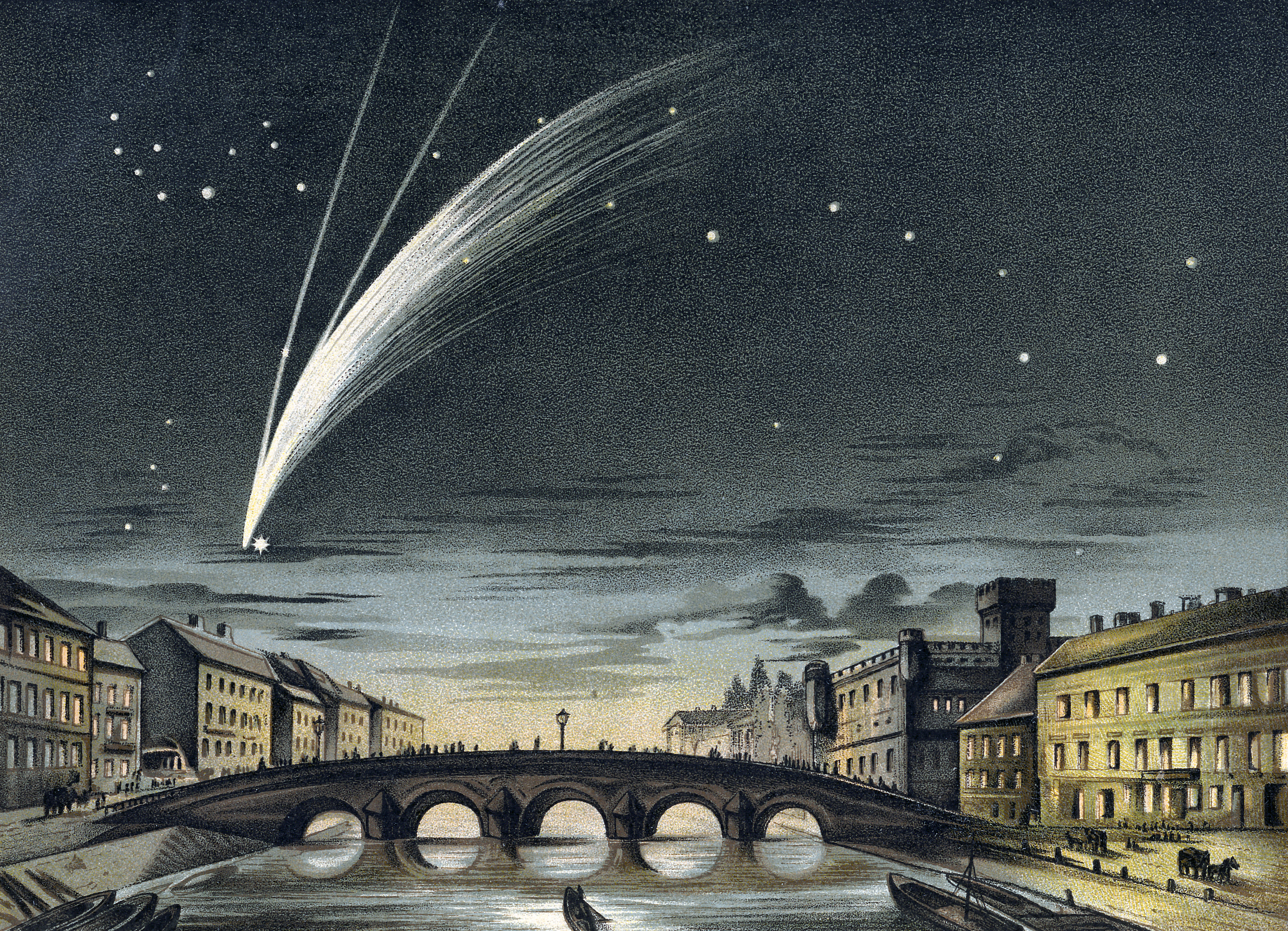
Arcturus next to the head of Comet Donati in 1858

In Arabic, Arcturus is one of two stars called al-simāk "the uplifted ones" (the other is Spica). Arcturus is specified as السماك الرامح as-simāk ar-rāmiħ "the uplifted one of the lancer". The term Al Simak Al Ramih has appeared in Al Achsasi Al Mouakket catalogue (translated into Latin as Al Simak Lanceator). This has been variously romanized in the past, leading to obsolete variants such as Aramec and Azimech. For example, the name Alramih is used in Geoffrey Chaucer's A Treatise on the Astrolabe (1391). Another Arabic name is Haris-el-sema, from حارس السماء ħāris al-samā' "the keeper of heaven". or حارس الشمال ħāris al-shamāl' "the keeper of north".

In Indian astronomy, Arcturus is called Swati or Svati (Devanagari स्वाति, Transliteration IAST svāti, svātī́), possibly 'su' + 'ati' ("great goer", in reference to its remoteness) meaning very beneficent. It has been referred to as "the real pearl" in Bhartṛhari's kāvyas.

In Chinese astronomy, Arcturus is called Da Jiao (Chinese: 大角; pinyin: Dàjiǎo; lit. 'great horn'), because it is the brightest star in the Chinese constellation called Jiao Xiu (Chinese: 角宿; pinyin: Jiǎo Xiǔ; lit. 'horn star'). Later it became a part of another constellation Kang Xiu (Chinese: 亢宿; pinyin: Kàng Xiǔ).

The Wotjobaluk Koori people of southeastern Australia knew Arcturus as Marpean-kurrk, mother of Djuit (Antares) and another star in Boötes, Weet-kurrk (Muphrid). Its appearance in the north signified the arrival of the larvae of the wood ant (a food item) in spring. The beginning of summer was marked by the star's setting with the Sun in the west and the disappearance of the larvae. The people of Milingimbi Island in Arnhem Land saw Arcturus and Muphrid as man and woman, and took the appearance of Arcturus at sunrise as a sign to go and harvest rakia or spikerush. The Weilwan of northern New South Wales knew Arcturus as Guembila "red".

Prehistoric Polynesian navigators knew Arcturus as Hōkūleʻa, the "Star of Joy". Arcturus is the zenith star of the Hawaiian Islands. Using Hōkūleʻa and other stars, the Polynesians launched their double-hulled canoes from Tahiti and the Marquesas Islands. Traveling east and north they eventually crossed the equator and reached the latitude at which Arcturus would appear directly overhead in the summer night sky. Knowing they had arrived at the exact latitude of the island chain, they sailed due west on the trade winds to landfall. If Hōkūleʻa could be kept directly overhead, they landed on the southeastern shores of the Big Island of Hawaii. For a return trip to Tahiti the navigators could use Sirius, the zenith star of that island. Since 1976, the Polynesian Voyaging Society's Hōkūleʻa has crossed the Pacific Ocean many times under navigators who have incorporated this wayfinding technique in their non-instrument navigation. The crew's successful landing in Waitangi, New Zealand on December 1985 earned them iwihood under the name of Ngāti Ruawāhia ("Tribe of the Arcturus" in Māori).

Arcturus had several other names that described its significance to indigenous Polynesians. In the Society Islands, Arcturus, called Ana-tahua-taata-metua-te-tupu-mavae ("a pillar to stand by"), was one of the ten "pillars of the sky", bright stars that represented the ten heavens of the Tahitian afterlife. In Hawaii, the pattern of Boötes was called Hoku-iwa, meaning "stars of the frigatebird". This constellation marked the path for Hawaiʻiloa on his return to Hawaii from the South Pacific Ocean. The Hawaiians called Arcturus Hoku-leʻa. It was equated to the Tuamotuan constellation Te Kiva, meaning "frigatebird", which could either represent the figure of Boötes or just Arcturus. However, Arcturus may instead be the Tuamotuan star called Turu. The Hawaiian name for Arcturus as a single star was likely Hoku-leʻa, which means "star of gladness", or "clear star". In the Marquesas Islands, Arcturus was probably called Tau-tou and was the star that ruled the month approximating January. The Māori and Moriori called it Tautoru, a variant of the Marquesan name and a name shared with Orion's Belt.

In Inuit astronomy, Arcturus is called the Old Man (Uttuqalualuk in Inuit languages) and The First Ones (Sivulliik in Inuit languages). The Mi'kmaq of eastern Canada saw Arcturus as Kookoogwéss, the owl.

The Sámi people call Arcturus Fávdna, a hunter pursuing Sarvvis or Sarvva, the reindeer or moose, which is a large constellation in Cassiopeia, Perseus, and Auriga. The handle of the Big Dipper is Fávdnadávgi, Fávdna's bow.

Early-20th-century Armenian scientist Nazaret Daghavarian theorized that the star commonly referred to in Armenian folklore as Gutani astgh (Armenian: Գութանի աստղ; lit. star of the plow) was in fact Arcturus, as the constellation of Boötes was called "Ezogh" (Armenian: Եզող; lit. the person who is plowing) by Armenians.

== In popular culture ==
In Ancient Rome, the star's celestial activity was supposed to portend tempestuous weather, and a personification of the star acts as narrator of the prologue to Plautus's comedy Rudens (c. 211 BC).

The Kāraṇḍavyūha Sūtra, compiled at the end of the 4th century or beginning of the 5th century, names one of Avalokiteśvaras meditative absorptions as "The face of Arcturus".

One of the possible etymologies offered for the name "Arthur" assumes that it is derived from "Arcturus" and that the late-5th- to early-6th-century figure on whom the myth of King Arthur is based was originally named for the star.

In the Middle Ages, Arcturus was considered a Behenian fixed star and attributed to the stone jasper and the plantain herb. Cornelius Agrippa listed its kabbalistic sign under the alternate name Alchameth.

Arcturus's light was employed in the mechanism used to open the 1933 Chicago World's Fair. The star was chosen as it was thought that light from Arcturus had started its journey at about the time of the previous Chicago World's Fair in 1893 (at 36.7 light-years away, the light actually started in 1896).

At the height of the American Civil War, President Abraham Lincoln observed Arcturus through a 9.6-inch refractor telescope when he visited the Naval Observatory in Washington, D.C., in August 1863.

Scottish author David Lindsay's 1920 science-fiction novel A Voyage to Arcturus takes place on the fictional planet Tormance, orbiting the star of Arcturus. In the novel Arcturus is portrayed as a double star, consisting of the two fictional stars Branchspell and Alppain.

In the 2016 film Passengers, the starship Avalon along with the main characters perform a slingshot maneuver around Arcturus on their journey to a distant solar system.

The star is also mentioned in the 2024 song "Arcturus Beaming" by The Crane Wives.
