= KS Persei =

Binary star system

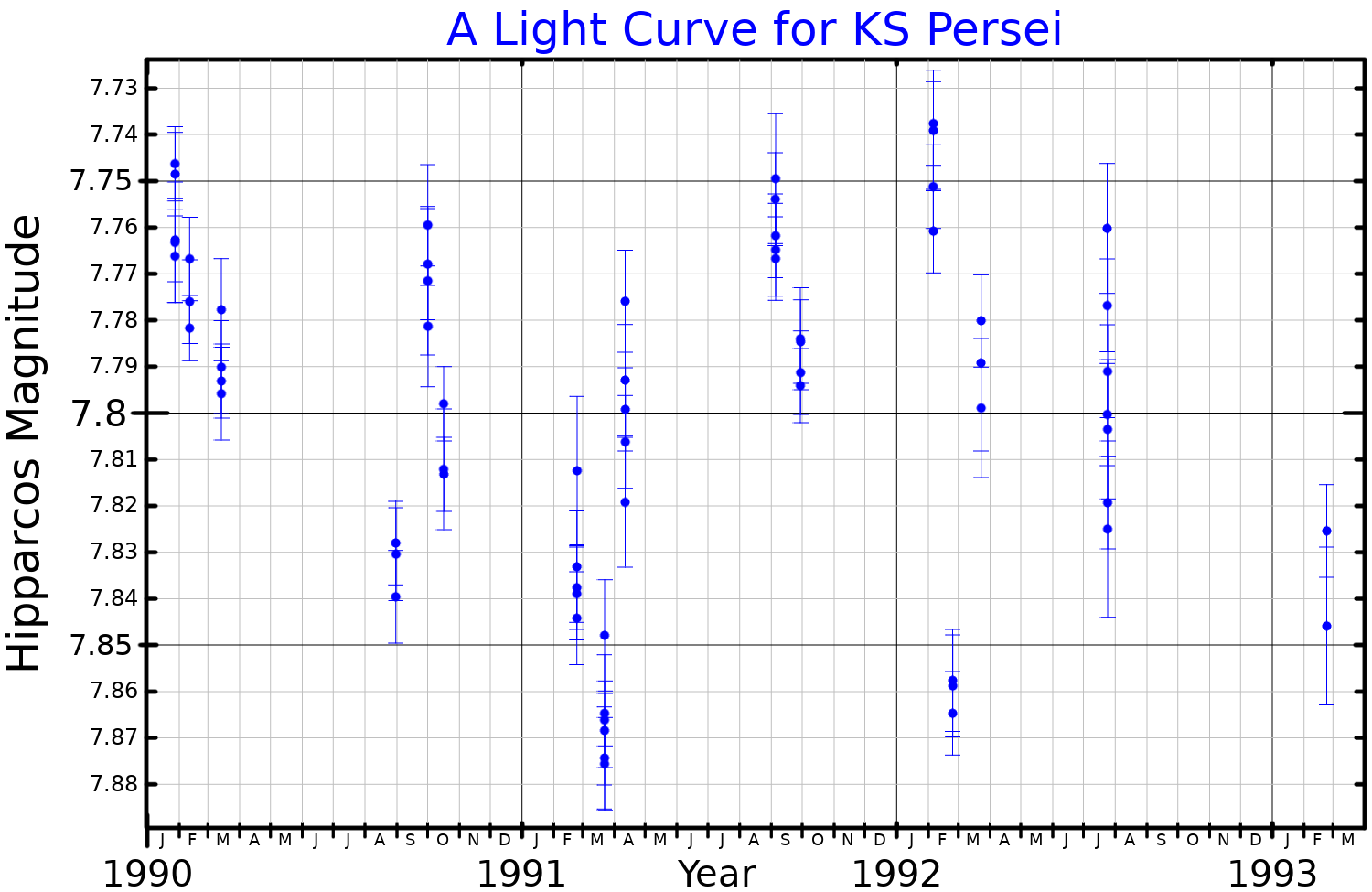
- A light curve for KS Persei, plotted from Hipparcos data

Observation data Epoch J2000.0 Equinox ICRS
- Constellation: Perseus
- Right ascension: 04^{h} 48^{m} 53.348^{s}
- Declination: +43° 16′ 32.09″
- Apparent magnitude (V): 7.70

Characteristics
- Spectral type: A5Iap + B2/3Ia/Ib
- B−V color index: 0.423±0.019
- Variable type: Semiregular

Astrometry
Proper motion (μ)	RA: 1.600 mas/yr Dec.: −1.781 mas/yr
Parallax (π)	0.1004±0.0414 mas
Distance	< 3,200 ly (< 1,000 pc)
Absolute magnitude (M_{V})	−3.3

Orbit
Period (P)	360.47±1.07 d
Semi-major axis (a)	≥243 ± 8 Gm (1.624 ± 0.053 AU)
Eccentricity (e)	0.28±0.03
Periastron epoch (T)	2,435,141.74±5.06 JD
Argument of periastron (ω) (secondary)	268.4±4.8°
Semi-amplitude (K_{1}) (primary)	51.4±1.6 km/s

Details

Supergiant
Mass	1.0 (assumed) M_{☉}
Luminosity	2,000 L_{☉}
Surface gravity (log g)	2.0±0.5 cgs
Temperature	9,500±300 K
Metallicity [Fe/H]	−0.73±0.10 dex

Companion
Mass	5 (times the primary mass) M_{☉}
Temperature	12,500 K

Other designations
- Bidelman's Star, KS Per, AG+43 500, BD+43 1069, HD 30353, HIP 22365, SAO 39773

Database references
SIMBAD	data

KS Persei is a binary system in the equatorial constellation of Perseus. It is sometimes known as Bidelman's Star, named after William P. Bidelman. The star is invisible to the naked eye with a mean apparent visual magnitude of 7.70. As of 2018, the structure and evolutionary history of this system remain uncertain, although some form of mass transfer is likely to have occurred to explain the observed properties.

The peculiar nature of the spectra for this star was noted in the Henry Draper Catalogue and was the subject of a study by W. P. Bidelman published in 1950. He found extremely weak lines of hydrogen, similar to those for Upsilon Sagittarii but at a lower temperature. The data strongly suggested the star has an abnormally low abundance of hydrogen in the stellar atmosphere. Bidelman noted that the radial velocity of the star is variable, demonstrating that it has an unseen companion. Preliminary orbital elements for this single-lined spectroscopic binary were published in 1955 by J. F. Heard and O. Boshko, giving an orbital period of 359.7 days and with eccentricity of 0.27. They found a large mass function of 4.5, suggesting that the supergiant has lost mass and the companion is relatively massive. The mass function was revised to 3.6±0.4 in 1988, suggesting the secondary is five times more massive than the primary. Although the Gaia parallax is small (and the Hipparcos parallax is negative), KS Persei is thought to be less than 1,000 pc away. Older studies have suggested distances up to 3,900 pc.

An analysis by G. Wallerstein and associates in 1967 showed that nitrogen is the second most abundant element in the primary, likely as a result of carbon cycling. G. A. Bakos attempted to photometrically detect an eclipse but was unsuccessful. However, he did tentatively detect semiregular variation with a period of ~30 days and an amplitude of 0.1 magnitude. This variability was confirmed by K. Morrison and G. P. H. Willingale in 1987, and they discovered an additional five day cycle. In 1982, J. S. Drilling and D. Schönberner detected a hot companion from spectra collected by the International Ultraviolet Explorer. The system is an infrared source, and models of the infrared flux suggest it is being emitted by circumstellar dust heated to 1,100 K. It is possible that the companion is obscured by dust.
