= 89 Herculis =

Star in the constellation Hercules

- Location of 89 Her (circled)

Observation data Epoch J2000 Equinox ICRS
- Constellation: Hercules
- Right ascension: 17^{h} 55^{m} 25.18845^{s}
- Declination: +26° 02′ 59.9701″
- Apparent magnitude (V): 5.34 - 5.54

Characteristics
- Evolutionary stage: post-AGB
- Spectral type: F2Ibe
- U−B color index: −0.34
- B−V color index: +0.34
- Variable type: SRd

Astrometry
Radial velocity (R_{v})	−28.5 km/s
Proper motion (μ)	RA: 3.894 mas/yr Dec.: 5.193 mas/yr
Parallax (π)	0.6893±0.0718 mas
Distance	approx. 4,700 ly (approx. 1,500 pc)
Absolute magnitude (M_{V})	−6.5

Orbit
Period (P)	288.36 days
Eccentricity (e)	0.189
Semi-amplitude (K_{1}) (primary)	3.09 km/s

Details

89 Her A
Mass	1.0 M_{☉}
Radius	71.0 R_{☉}
Luminosity	8,350 L_{☉}
Surface gravity (log g)	0.55 cgs
Temperature	6,550 K
Metallicity	−0.5
Rotational velocity (v sin i)	23 km/s

Other designations
- 89 Her, V441 Herculis, AAVSO 1751+26, BD+26°3120, FK5 1468, GC 24382, HD 163506, HIP 87747, HR 6685, SAO 85545

Database references
SIMBAD	data

89 Herculis is a binary star system located about 4,700 light years away from the Sun in the northern constellation of Hercules. It is visible to the naked eye as a faint, fifth magnitude star. The system is moving closer to the Earth with a heliocentric radial velocity of −28.5 km/s.

This is a spectroscopic binary with the pair surrounded by a dusty disc, and an hourglass-shaped nebula formed from outflowing gas. The mass of the nebula is about 0.018 M_{☉}, of which a majority is in the outflow. The system shows variable brightness and spectral line profiles. The companion has a very low mass and luminosity and orbits the primary in 288 days.

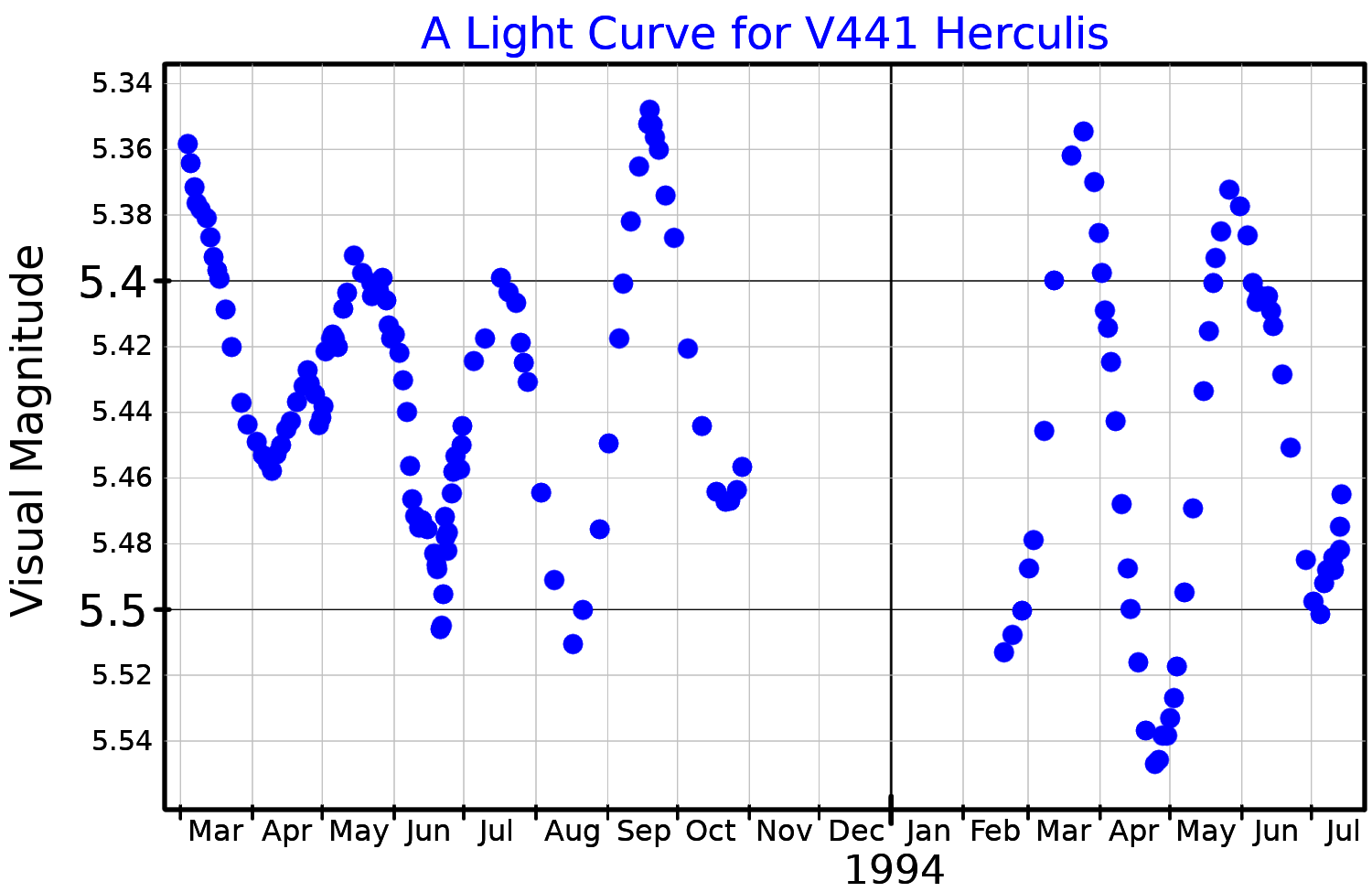
A visual band light curve for V441 Herculis, adapted from Fernie and Seager (1995)

The primary component has a stellar classification of F2Ibe, and is among a rare class of post-asymptotic giant branch stars – low-mass stars in the last stages of their lives, highly inflated to appear as supergiants. It is classified as a semiregular variable star, subtype SRd, and ranges from magnitude 5.3 down to 5.5 over a period of around 68 days. The star has expanded to 71 times the Sun's radius and is radiating 8,350 times the Sun's luminosity from its enlarged photosphere at an effective temperature of 6,550 K.
