= Northern celestial hemisphere =

Northern half of the celestial sphere

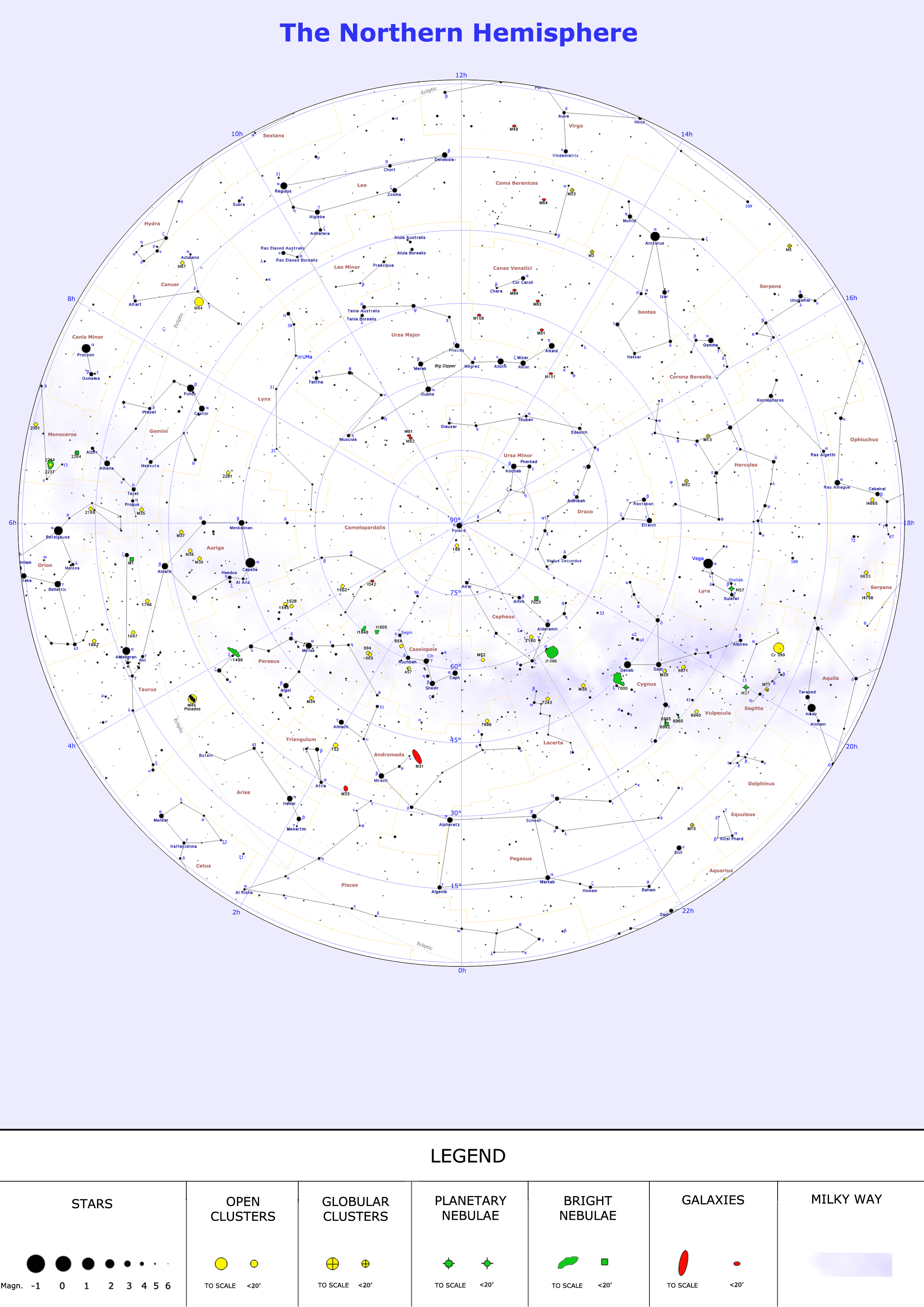
A star chart of the entire Northern Sky, centered on the north celestial pole

The northern celestial hemisphere, also called the Northern Sky, is the northern half of the celestial sphere. Most easily viewed from the Earth's Northern Hemisphere, the hemisphere appears to rotate westward (counterclockwise) around a polar axis due to Earth's rotation.

At any given time, the entire Northern Sky is visible from the geographic North Pole, while less of the hemisphere is visible the farther south the observer is located. The southern counterpart is the southern celestial hemisphere.

== Astronomy ==
In the context of astronomical discussions or writing about celestial cartography, the northern celestial hemisphere may be referred to as the Northern Hemisphere.

For celestial mapping, astronomers may conceive the sky like the inside of a sphere divided into two halves by the celestial equator. The Northern Sky or Northern Hemisphere is therefore the half of the celestial sphere that is north of the celestial equator. Even if this geocentric model is the ideal projection of the terrestrial equator onto the imaginary celestial sphere, the northern and southern celestial hemispheres are not to be confused with descriptions of the terrestrial hemispheres of Earth itself.

== Observation ==
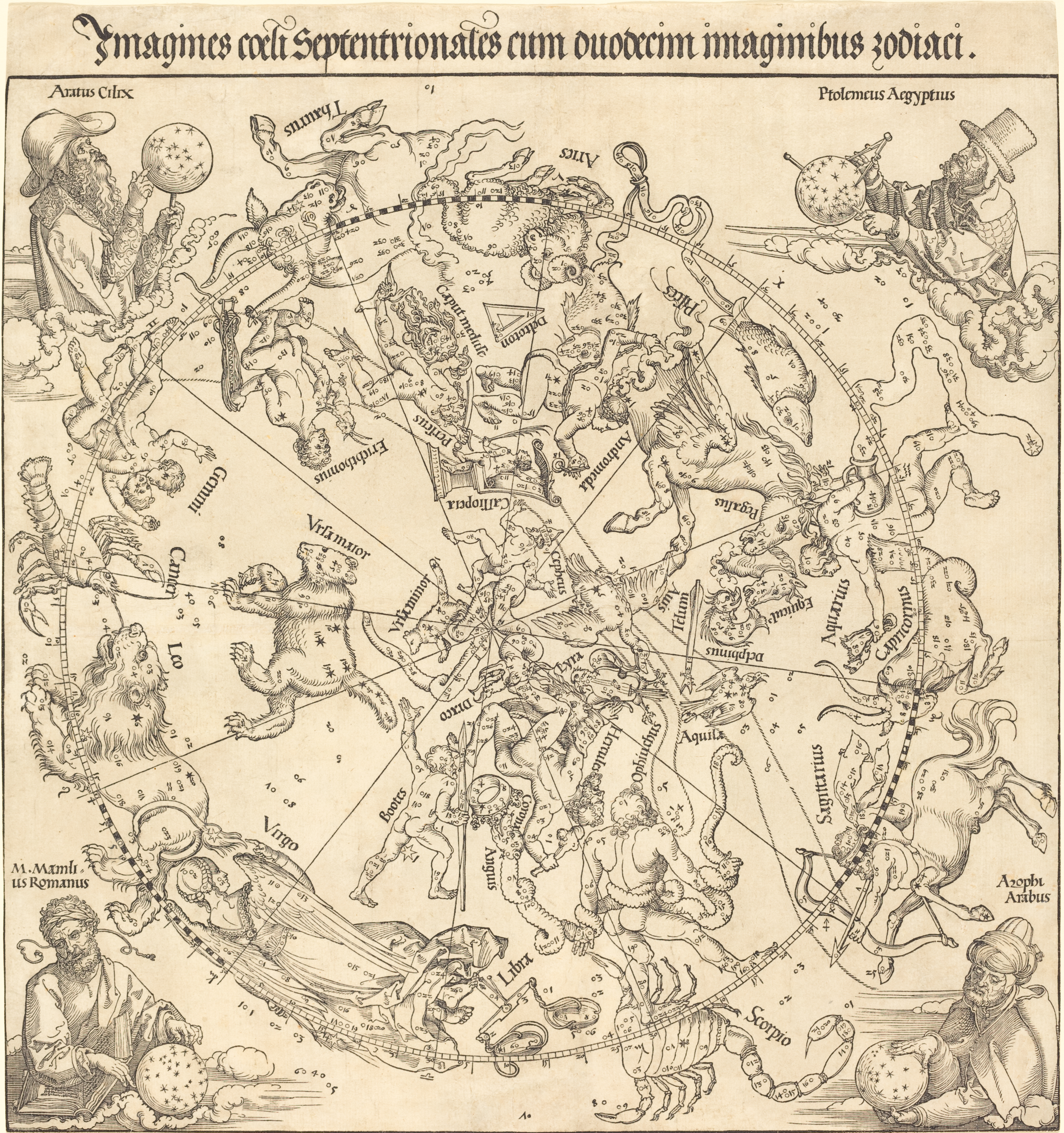
1515 map of the northern celestial hemisphere by Albrecht Dürer.

Of the modern 88 constellations, 43 lie predominantly within the northern celestial hemisphere, with 28 completely on the northern hemisphere. The other 14 constellations (Aquarius, Aquila, Canis Minor, Cetus, Hydra, Leo, Monoceros, Ophiuchus, Orion, Pisces, Serpens, Sextans, Taurus, and Virgo) lie in some piece on the southern hemisphere. Eridanus has some piece within the northern celestial hemisphere.

- Andromeda
- Aquarius
- Aquila
- Aries
- Auriga
- Boötes
- Camelopardalis
- Cancer
- Canes Venatici
- Canis Minor
- Cassiopeia
- Cepheus
- Cetus
- Coma Berenices
- Corona Borealis
- Cygnus
- Delphinus
- Draco
- Equuleus
- Eridanus
- Gemini
- Hercules
- Hydra
- Lacerta
- Leo
- Leo Minor
- Lynx
- Lyra
- Monoceros
- Ophiuchus
- Orion
- Pegasus
- Perseus
- Pisces
- Sagitta
- Serpens
- Sextans
- Taurus
- Triangulum
- Ursa Major
- Ursa Minor
- Virgo
- Vulpecula

The pole star of the northern celestial hemisphere is Polaris, the brightest star in the constellation Ursa Minor. The brightest star in the northern celestial hemisphere is Arcturus, the fourth-brightest star in the sky, closely followed by Vega.

== See also ==
- Southern celestial hemisphere
