= Spectral atlas =

In astronomy, a spectral atlas is a collection of spectra of one or more objects, intended as a reference work for comparison with spectra of other objects. Several different types of collections are titled spectral atlases: those intended for spectral classification, for key reference, or as a collection of spectra of a general type of object.

In any spectral atlas, generally all the spectra have been taken with the same equipment, or with very similar instruments at different locations, to provide data as uniform as possible in its spectral resolution, wavelength coverage, noise characteristics, etc.

== Types ==
=== For spectral classification ===
When assigning a spectral classification, a spectral atlas is a collection of standard spectra of stars with known spectral types, against which a spectrum of an unknown star is compared. It is analogous to an identification key in biology. Originally, such atlases included reproductions of the monochrome spectra as recorded on photographic plates, as in the original Morgan-Keenan-Kellman atlas and other atlases. These atlases include identifications and notations for use of those spectral features to be used as discriminators between close spectral types. With very large surveys of the sky which include automated assignment of spectral classification from the digital spectra data, graphical atlases have been supplanted by libraries of spectra of standard stars which often can be downloaded from VizieR and other sources.

=== For key reference ===
A spectral atlas can be a very high-quality spectrum of a key reference object, often made with very high spectral resolution, generally presented in large-format graphical form as a line chart (but normally strictly without markers at specific data points) of intensity or relative intensity (which for a star whose spectrum is dominated by absorption lines runs from zero to a normalized continuum) as a function of wavelength. Such spectral atlases have been made several times for the Sun (e.g.,), Arcturus, other bright stars, planets, quasars, etc. Unlike classification atlases, such atlases made from data taken with photographic media were digitized with a densitometer and the digitized result is presented. Sometimes these atlases include identifications of spectral features, but often such identifications are presented in tabular form in separate publications (e.g.,).

=== For objects of a general type ===
A spectral atlas can be a collection of spectra of different individual objects of a general type, showing the variety of spectra inherent to the type, or a collection of spectra from a single object that varies over time, showing the variations in the spectra.
