= For Your Ears Only (radio program) =

American radio program

For Your Ears Only/On Air (formerly Newsweek on Air) was a weekly radio program and podcast previously produced by Newsweek, Inc. and co-produced with RKO Radio Networks, Associated Press, Jones Radio Networks, and Triton Media Group, then an independent, non-profit project of the New York Foundation for the Arts and distributed by the Radio America network. It debuted on April 25, 1982, with its main producer-anchor David M. Alpern, a reporter, writer, then senior editor at Newsweek, who was at the helm during the program's 32-year run.

The weekend program aired Saturday nights or Sundays. The non-profit version acquired the "For Your Ears Only" title in June 2010. The program ended its 32-year run with the September 28, 2014, broadcast, after which the non-profit Internet Archive (archive.org) began posting its broadcasts back to 1982 as an online audio collection.

From 2015-2017 Alpern hosted the weekly World Policy On Air podcast for World Policy Institute.

Alpern also regularly records news stories of interest to the visually impaired for the Gatewave non-profit.
