= Craig Chester (astronomer) =

American astronomer

Craig Chester is an American astronomer who co-founded the Monterey Institute for Research in Astronomy (MIRA) in the Los Padres National Forest in California along with five other astronomy students from Case Western Reserve University and three non-astronomers. Chester suggested that the Star of Bethlehem was a real historical event, and that Jupiter's "stationary point" during apparent retrograde motion could explain the Star's "stopping" over Bethlehem, He wrote an article which helped inspire The Star of Bethlehem documentary. Chester developed software for satellite communications and ground equipment for the United States military. He was president of MIRA in 2016.

== Career ==
In 1963, Craig Chester became a member of the Astronomical Society of the Pacific as a student at Harvard College. For his undergraduate research about classifying galaxies he created a color-magnitude diagram for the Virgo Cluster and field galaxies by using Erik Holmberg's catalogue of photometric data. Chester earned his Ph.D in astronomy from Case Western Reserve University (CWRU) in Cleveland, Ohio when jobs in astronomy were challenging to find. The future availability of federal funds for investigating the cosmos was increasingly uncertain. With 800 positions in research astronomy in the US, there were 800 graduate students competing for openings. Many graduates were unemployed or needed to find work outside astronomy, and those with positions related to astronomy had long waits for telescope viewing time.

Chester and Weaver saw a nova in the Northern Cross on their first night of viewing. The Northern Cross is an asterism within the constellation Cygnus the Swan.

In 1971, Craig Chester and William Bruce Weaver, another astronomy student at CWRU, talked about buying a small telescope together in hopes of maintaining some contact with astronomy following graduation. Within weeks, after discussing the idea with four other CWRU astronomy students along with two of their wives and one roommate, they chose instead to build their own observatory. After looking at topographic maps in the Cleveland Public Library, they located a site that appeared promising for astronomical seeing. The nine students founded MIRA in 1972 as a nonprofit institution, paying the down payment on 80 acres in the Los Padres National Forest out of their savings.

The nine members of the original MIRA group included six astronomers, Craig Chester, W. Bruce Weaver, Albert Merville, Hazel E. Ross, and Cynthia and Nelson Irvine, along with two wives, Sandra Weaver and Ann Merville, and Donna Burych. As they graduated, the group began a mail-order discount bookstore to make money for the MIRA observatory they planned to build, and each of the nine members contributed a part of their earnings from work, which included part-time teaching, computer programming and other jobs. In 1975, after Army engineers graded a road to the site for free as a training exercise giving them access, Chester and Weaver spent their first night camping on Chews Ridge in Los Padres National Forest, their selected site. "It was pretty dazzling," said Chester. "There directly overhead was the Northern Cross, and suddenly we saw a star that didn't belong. It was a nova (an exploding star), the first naked-eye nova in 30 years. If that's not an omen, there's no such thing as an omen." It was August 30, and Nova Cygni 1975 was seen around the world for the first time that night.

William P. Bidelman, director of the CWRU observatory, gave the MIRA group their first cash donation. Chester said they began with a credibility problem. After members of the MIRA team made a presentation about their idea to the American Astronomical Society in 1972, they began to get endorsements and help from established astronomers.

Astrophysicist Martin Schwarzschild of Princeton University gave MIRA a loan for an indefinite period of a 36-inch telescope mirror that had been intended as a backup for a NASA project but which had never been used; the University of Arizona's College of Optical Sciences donated the exacting labor to cut the needed hole in the already-polished mirror, and the Research Corporation gave the MIRA group a $76,000 grant to build the telescope, among many other donations. In 1980, Bernard M. Oliver of the Hewlett Packard company created a $200,000 one-for-one one-year matching grant to help build the MIRA observatory. While Chester worked to rewrite the coordinate program for the telescope, research and a community lecture series began, and both Oliver and Bidelman became part of MIRA's early advisory board along with photographer Ansel Adams, physicist Luis Walter Alvarez, astronomer Bart Bok, politician George E. Brown and astronomer Carl Sagan. The MIRA observatory opened in 1984, conducting research on the evolution of stars, and their success encouraged other astronomers to seek private funding for astronomy research.

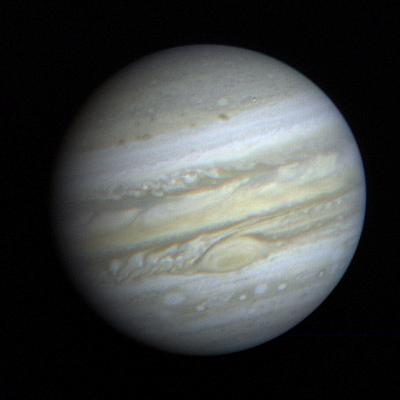
Jupiter, a possible candidate for being the Star of Bethlehem.

Chester was president of MIRA in 1993 as they continued to improve facilities and do research while providing a community service class, a summer high school science teacher program, and a public lecture series. Chester gave his address on the Star of Bethlehem. "If you’re an astronomer," Chester said later, "one of the things you learn at an early age is that everyone wants to know about the Star of Bethlehem." After giving a presentation at Hillsdale College in 1992, Chester published an article in Imprimis suggesting a series of events involving the planet Jupiter and the star Regulus that took place in 3 BC, and between Jupiter and the planet Venus in 2 BC might explain the Star of Bethlehem. Chester suggested the Christmas song "We Three Kings" was an almost entirely incorrect popular conception and used a 1 BC date for Herod the Great’s death based on the work of Ernest L. Martin, whom Chester has called an authoritative source on the Star of Bethlehem. Chester suggested the planetary motions and conjunctions of 3 BC and 2 BC involving Jupiter, Venus, and also Mercury, Mars, and Saturn were impressive, and noted that Jupiter could have stopped over the town of Bethlehem due to apparent retrograde motion.

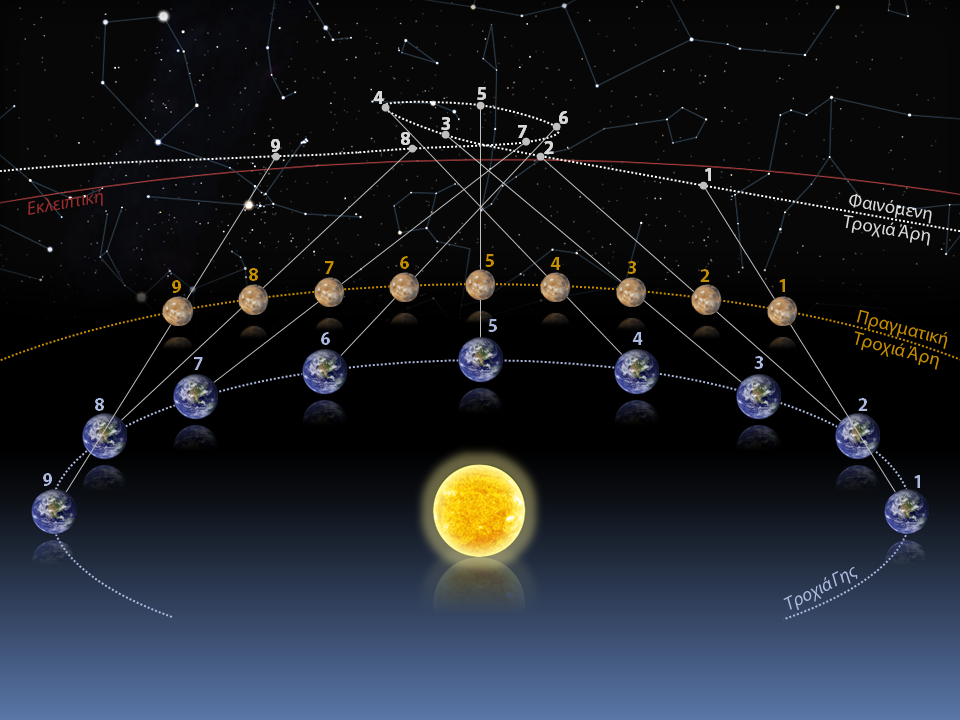
Apparent retrograde motion occurs when Earth passes a planet as they orbit the Sun. The looping motion of Mars as seen from Earth is shown here. Chester said Jupiter's retrograde motion could explain how the Star of Bethlehem appeared to "stop".

Craig Chester suggested the Star of Bethlehem "stopping" referred to in the biblical narrative could have been what astronomers call a "stationary point". Chester said, "A planet normally moves eastward through the stars from night to night and month to month, but regularly exhibits a ‘retrograde loop.’ As it approaches the opposite point in the sky from the Sun, it appears to slow, come to a full stop, and move backward (westward) through the sky for some weeks. Again it slows, stops, and resumes its eastward course." Chester also noted that the Magi were known to have traveled to attend the birth and crowning of kings. He suggested Joseph and Mary (the mother of Jesus) might have traveled to Bethlehem in 2 BC for a census in honor of the 25th anniversary of Caesar Augustus's rule and the 750th anniversary of the founding of Rome. Chester's Imprimis article was received by Frederick Larson, a Texas attorney who had become intrigued with the Star of Bethlehem. Using Chester's article as a guide, Larson used the Starry Night astronomy software program and found the events Chester had described, and after presenting those findings in the United States, Europe, and other countries, Larson co-executive produced The Star of Bethlehem film with Stephen McEveety, producer of The Passion of the Christ, Braveheart, and other movies.

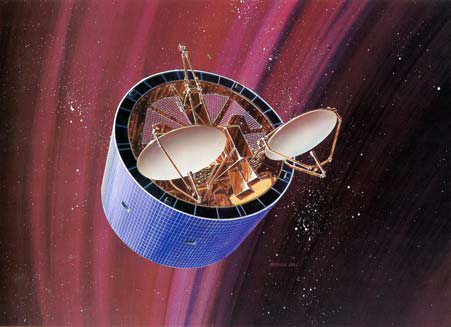
One example of a defense system satellite communications device.

Chester has worked as a software developer in satellite communications for the United States Navy and United States Air Force. He has also been employed by BAE Systems plc, an American defense supplier and Science Applications International Corporation (SAIC). At SAIC, which is a government services contractor, Chester supervised a team that managed data from US Navy and Air Force weather satellites at the Fleet Numerical Meteorology and Oceanography Center.

Chester also continued his involvement with the Monterey Institute for Research in Astronomy, and is its president in 2016.

== Personal life ==
In 1984, Chester married Nancy Lynn Welliver, whom he had met in high school. Lynne Chester was a foundation administrator, photographer, and artist who died in 2012 of Amyotrophic lateral sclerosis (Lou Gehrig's Disease) after 27 years of marriage.

== See also ==
- Apparent retrograde motion
- List of astronomers
