= Chews Ridge Lookout =

Fire lookout tower in California, United States

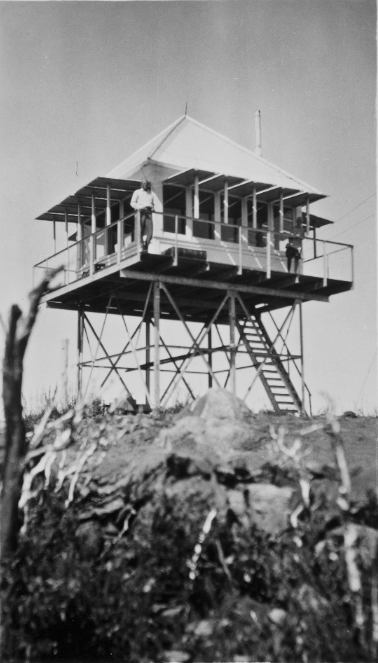
- Mary and Arthur Story standing on the deck of the Chew's Ridge Lookout Station in 1929
- Interactive map of the Chews Ridge Lookout area

General information
- Type: Fire lookout tower
- Location: Los Padres National Forest
- Coordinates: 36.3120°N 121.568330°W
- Construction started: 1929
- Completed: 1929

Height
- Height: 24 feet (7.3 m)

Technical details
- Structural system: Steel

The Chews Ridge Lookout is located at the northern end of the Santa Lucia Range of the Los Padres National Forest, about 50 miles (80 km) southeast of Monterey, California, and approximately 30 miles (48 km) west of Highway 101. The current tower was built in 1929 and staffed until around 1990. A volunteer organization began recruiting individuals to staff the tower in 2019. The ridge and tower were named for homesteaders Constantine and Nellie Chew, who patented 315 acres (127 ha) on the ridge in the late 19th century.

== Construction and current use ==
In 1919, a family resided in a government-owned cabin at the summit, which also served as a fire lookout. The 12 feet (3.7 m) tall steel frame tower supporting the 13 by 13 feet (4.0 m × 4.0 m) cab was built in 1929. The tower is at an elevation of 5,082 feet (1,549 m). Arthur Story and his wife were among the first residents of the lookout. The lookout was destroyed by the Marble Cone Fire in 1977 and rebuilt in 1978. In 1984 the cab was replaced with a standard R-6 design which featured a cat walk and a flat roof.

The tower cab is accessible by a steep staircase of extremely narrow steps. There is no running water, electrical service, air conditioning, or heating inside the cab. Additionally, there is no cell phone service, landline telephone, or internet connectivity on Chews Ridge. Communications are conducted with a battery-powered U.S. Forest Service radio.

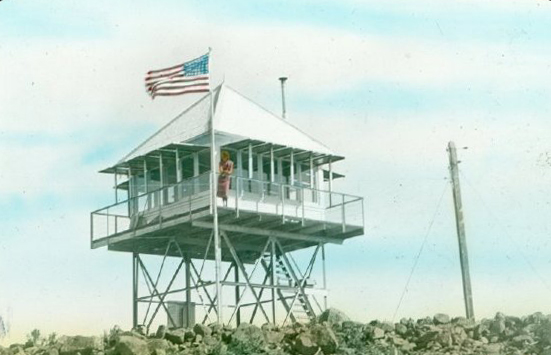
Color slide of Chews Ridge Lookout circa 1934

Beginning in the 1940s, the tower was seasonally staffed by C. C. Yates and his wife of Arroyo Grande, California. They continued to work seasonally through the 1950s. The tower has not been staffed by the U.S. Forest Service since about 1990. The Forest Service subsequently used the structure to house radio repeater equipment and to mount antennas. In 2019, the California-South Chapter of the Forest Fire Lookout Association reached an agreement with the U.S. Forest Service to begin staffing the tower with volunteers. They cleaned up the cabin, rehabilitated the pit toilet, reinstalled and refurbished the Osborne Fire Finder, and refurbished the tower inside and out.

The Forest Fire Lookout Association is training volunteers to serve as forest fire lookouts. They began staffing the tower in August 2019. Their goal is to staff the tower seven days per week from May through November. The lookout is accessible from Carmel Valley Road, and then south on Forest Route 18S02/Tassajara Road 9 miles (14 km). Most of the Tassajara Road is unpaved. Some portions of the road are only suitable for high-clearance or four-wheel drive vehicles, and depending on current weather conditions, may become impassible.

The lookout atop Chews Peak was one of six active fire lookouts in the Monterey Ranger District of the Los Padres National Forest. The others were located on Cone Peak, Ventana Double Cone, Junipero Serra Peak, Pinyon Peak, and Three Peaks.

== History ==
=== Original inhabitants ===
The Esselen people are indigenous to the Santa Lucia Mountains. They left unique handprints on cave walls which are found to the south of Chews Ridge. There is evidence of Esselen occupation, including bedrock mortars found in grasslands near concentrations of Valley Oak.

=== Ranching era ===
One of the first non-Native Americans to climb the ridge was William Brewer, who climbed the lower slopes of the ridge in May 1861. Chews Ridge was named for Constantine Marcus and Eleanor "Nellie" (James) Chew, who were married near Monastery Beach in Carmel, California on September 29, 1881. He was 45 and she was 17. They homesteaded two parcels of 155 acres and 160 acres on the ridge to the west of the peak in 1880 and 1892, about 4 miles south of Jamesburg. Constantine Chew was born in Ohio and descended from the Chew family of England. His wife was the daughter of John and Cynthia (Cox) James. Jamesburg was named after her father.

Eleanor Chew was the Jamesburg Postmaster from 1894 to 1919. She was paid $159.20 in 1902 (equivalent to $5917 in 2025). She also wrote a column titled "Jamesburg Gleanings" filled with local news for the Salinas Californian and Salinas Daily Index newspapers for 25 years. On September 25, 1906, Eleanor Chew reported in her column that "an automobile party of seven, accompanied by a camp wagon, arrived here last night and will go to Miller Canyon today. This is the first auto to attempt the grade above here. H. Dana, of Mountain View, owner of the machine, is in charge." Daily auto stage service to and from Salinas began in 1914. Nellie Chew also became the librarian for the Jamesburg branch of the Monterey County Library established on March 14, 1914, located in the post office.

The Chews sold the ranch in April 1919 to William Gordon and Pauline (Henningsen) Lambert of Jamesburg. Constantine Chew died on March 29, 1920, at age 85 in National City, California, at the home of his son John. Eleanor died at age 88 on 36 January 1952 in Pacific Grove, California.

=== World War II ===
During World War II, the lookout was staffed by observers for the civilian Aircraft Warning Service. Additional housing was constructed for the observers, who were on duty around the clock.

=== China Camp ===
China Camp
- Interactive map of China Camp
- Location: Monterey County, California, United States
- Elevation: 4,260 ft (1,300 m)
- Type: Drive In
- Land: Los Padres National Forest
- Campsites: 10
- Facilities: Two vault toilets, picnic tables
- Water: No
- Fee: $20/night
- Fires: Yes
- Operated by: Recreation.gov

China Camp is a public drive-in campground near the summit of Chews Ridge. The camp is named after the many Chinese workers who lived at and near the site while they constructed the road. The camp site is the eastern trail head of the Pine Ridge Trail. There is a modern pit toilet. No water is available.

There are 10 campsites that can be reserved in advance. As of Summer 2018 campsites 1–5 are open year-round; campsites 6–10 are only open in the summer season. Fees are $20 per night and allow one vehicle per site. Additional vehicles cost more. There is no overnight trailhead parking without a campground reservation.

The unpaved southern, high-altitude portion of the road from Tassajara Road to Chews Ridge is only suitable for high-clearance or four-wheel drive vehicles, and during extended wet weather the road is impassable to all. The road continues over the mountain 7.9 miles (12.7 km) down a very narrow and steep dirt road suitable only for four-wheel drive vehicles to Tassajara Hot Springs. It is the only high peak in the Santa Lucia Range with a road crossing its summit.

China Camp was named after the Chinese workers who lived at the camp in 1888 while they completed building the road to the resort at Tassajara Hot Springs. On steep portions, the wagon driver would drag a log behind the wagon to prevent it from descending too quickly.

=== Fire history ===
In 1903, a fire started by an untended campfire near Chews Ridge burned a path 6 miles (9.7 km) wide to the coast over three months. E. A. Sterling reported that "the largest fire in recent years started last year, 1903, in July, and burned for three months. It started from an unextinguished campfire in Township 18 south, range 4 west [in the Chews Ridge area], and burned a strip of about a township wide through to the coast, becoming wider towards its western end." On July 21 of that year Eleanor "Nellie" Chew reported that "a fire has been raging on the Carmel for some time past and the air is filled with smoke. The weather has been cool, otherwise it would have been very unpleasant." Two months later, on September 22, 1903, she reported that "the mountain fire which has given the people of this vicinity so much trouble for the past month has again broken out and nine or ten men have been fighting it for several days. The coast fire has also come over the divide and crossed the Carmel river and threatens Andrew Church's place with destruction."

In 1906, a fire that began in Palo Colorado Canyon from the embers of a campfire burned 150,000 acres (61,000 ha) over 35 days and was finally extinguished by the first rainfall of the season. The lookout was destroyed by the Marble Cone Fire in 1977 and rebuilt in 1978. In 2017, the Soberanes fire burned east to Chews Ridge, requiring fire fighters to burn backfires to stop further spread.

=== Geography and geology ===
A developed hardwood forest and mixed community of Valley Oak (Quercus lobata) and Coulter pine (Pinus coulteri) thrives on the slopes of Chews Ridge. The ridge unusually supports extensive areas of savanna with large valley oaks, with many patches of open grassland than other peaks in the Santa Lucia Range. The predominant rock types include pre-cretaceous schist, very small ultrabasic outcrops, and Miocene sandstone.

=== Murders ===
On June 6, 2014, Joseph Nissensohn was convicted of murder and sentenced to death for killing Tanya Jones, 14, and Tammy Jarschke, 13, of Seaside, California on Chews Ridge in 1981.

=== Weather ===
Chews Ridge, at an elevation of 5,082 feet (1,549 m), is the third highest peak in the Santa Lucia Range. Junipero Serra Peak at 5,865 feet (1,788 m) is the highest. During severe winter storms, the peak can receive 1 to 2 feet (0.30 to 0.61 m) of snow. In 1907, Eleanor Chew reported that 9 feet (2.7 m) of snow had accumulated on the ridge.

== Astronomy use ==
Astronomy graduate students at Warner and Swasey Observatory, Case Western Reserve University were interested in building their own astronomical observatory. They learned about a 36-inch unused mirror stored at Princeton U. and obtained it on a long-term loan. They eventually began looking for mountain ranges "along the west coast of a continent" where the air was smooth from the ocean, "resulted in small sharp star images". Two student members traveled to the Monterey area to investigate the Santa Lucia Range.

In 1972, members of the Monterey Institute for Research in Astronomy applied to the Forest Service for a use permit, and it was granted in 1974. Over the next couple of years, the Case students moved to Monterey County, and took part-time jobs in the area, to make a down-payment on 80 acres (32 ha) in Cachagua Valley, near the Carmel foothills. In 1975, the Army Corps of Engineers finished the last half-mile to the observatory as part of a training exercise. Astronomer Bart Bok and his astronomer wife Priscilla donated "their entire collection of journals and books". The Oliver Observing Station (36°18′20″N 121°34′00″W) was built 0.6 miles (0.97 km) south-southeast of the lookout.

When the facility opened in 1982, it was the first private observatory to open in the United States in the 20th century.

== See also ==
- Mountain peaks of California
- Monterey Institute for Research in Astronomy
- Tassajara Hot Springs
