= Tassajara Hot Springs =

Thermal springs in California

Coordinates: 36.233614°N 121.550093°W

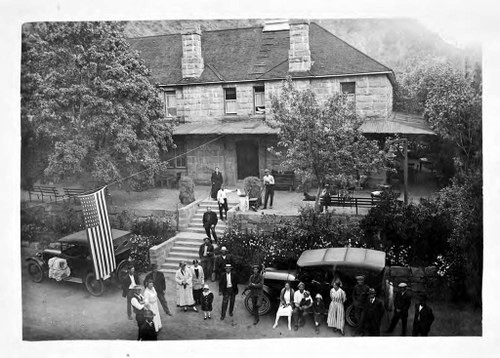
Tassajara Hotel circa 1920

Tassajara Hot Springs is a collection of natural hot springs within the Ventana Wilderness area of the Santa Lucia Range and Los Padres National Forest in Monterey County, California. The springs have been the site of various resorts since 1868. A horse trail was in use until in 1886, when a stagecoach road was constructed over Chews Ridge to the springs. Monterey County designated the road to the resort as a public highway in June, 1870. Charles Quilty bought the resort in 1886. He had a sandstone hotel built. He and members of his family owned the springs until 1945. The new owners refurbished the hotel but it burned in a fire in 1949. The resort changed hands several times over the next three decades. One owner planned to add a helicopter service, but he was killed in an airplane crash. Since 1967, the hot springs have been the site of a Zen Buddhist monastery which is open to visitors during the summer months only.

== Etymology ==
Tasajera is a Spanish-American word derived from an indigenous Esselen language, which designates a "place where meat is hung to dry." It has also been known as Tassajara Springs, Tesahara Springs and on mining claims as Agua Caliente ["Hot Water"].

== Location ==
The hot springs are located 28.3 miles (45.5 km) from Carmel Valley Road. The springs are privately owned by the San Francisco Zen Center which operates the Tassajara Zen Mountain Center on site. The last 8.2 miles (13.2 km) of the road into the springs is extremely narrow and steep, and visitors are encouraged to use four-wheel drive vehicles or take a shuttle from Jamesburg, California, where the Zen Center maintains offices. Jamesburg is at the foot of Chews Ridge, 13.8 miles (22.2 km) from the hot springs.

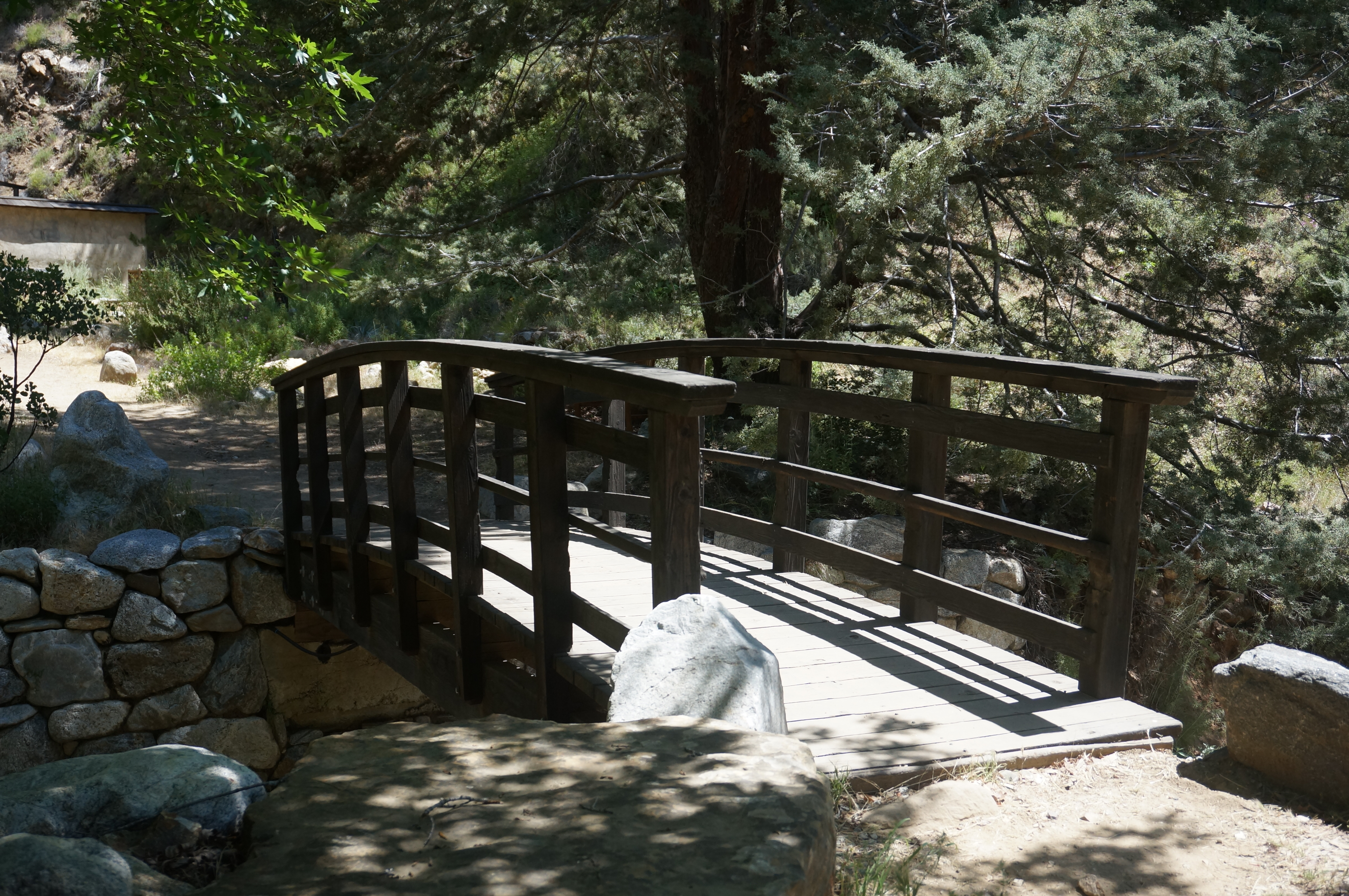
Bridge across Tassajara Creek to the hot springs baths

== Geology ==
In 1918, the state mineralogist from the California State Mining Bureau produced a report detailing the large amount of hot water that issues at Tassajara Hot Springs through about seventeen thermal springs in the bed of the creek and along its southern bank. These range in temperature from about 100 °F (38 °C) to 140 °F (60 °C) and vary from mere seepages to flows of 8 US gallons (30 L) a minute.

Thermal waters issue from a gneiss exposed along the creek for a distance of 600 feet (180 m) or more. Above and below this exposure the rock is granitic and in some places contains small garnets. The crystalline rocks are overlain by a series of shales, sandstones, and limestones, whose structure in the area north of Arroyo Seco is shown by the beds of massive buff-colored sandstone that dip northeastward at an angle of about 45°. A western limb of this structure has not been recorded but may exist in the mountains further towards the coast. The observed dips at least suggest that Tassajara Hot Springs issue at a locality where Arroyo Seco crosses a zone of intense pressure in the underlying crystalline rocks.

Analyses of two of the thermal waters showed them to be noticeably sulphuretted, and only moderately mineralized. The water of the arsenic spring has a distinctly yellow color, which in a few other springs has been ascribed to alkaline sulphides in solution. At the north edge of the creek, a few yards above the hot springs, there are two cool springs in which iron is deposited. An analysis of the easternmost of these springs was also made.

The two hot springs apparently issue from the same general source and show only slight differences in composition. Primary salinity and primary alkalinity are the chief stable properties, but the waters are characterized by high subalkalinity, of which silica is the main component. The carbonate radicle reported is presumably calculated from the alkalinity determination and doubtless includes sulphides and possibly silicates. The apparent absence of arsenic in the so-called arsenic spring is noteworthy.

Of markedly different character from the hot springs, the cool iron spring is less than half as concentrated and has secondary alkalinity as its dominant property. Subalkalinity is not reported, but is probably relatively low. The spring is probably of essentially surface origin, and not directly related to the thermal waters.

Algous growths in the creek below the hot springs are recorded, as the growths are related to the sulphuretted character of the water. Although they are common to thermal sulphur springs, the relatively large volume of water in the creek at Tassajara Hot Springs, its comparatively slow cooling, and the presence of both swift currents and of quiet pools, affords an unusually good opportunity to observe growth variations. Water from two of the largest springs is piped to two plunge baths, and a vapor bath constructed over the hottest spring in the creek bed.

== History ==
=== Esselen ===
The springs were first used by native Esselen people who occupied the area for at least a thousand years before the Spanish colonial period. Native Americans from many different tribes knew of Tassajara and its healing properties. In 1843 Jack Swan met a group of Indians traveling up Carmel Valley on their way to the springs. He learned they were planning to build a sweat lodge to try to cure skin disease that had infected a number of them. Swan wrote, "Frequently there would be several tribes there at one time but because of the great abundance of wild game of all kinds and fish they had no trouble living."

The native people were subjugated by Spanish missionaries beginning in 1770 through the California Mission system under Father Junípero Serra. These claims are contested by the Diocese of Monterey. By the time of the American Civil War, the Europeans who came upon Tassajara found few traces of the Esselens' earlier presence. A few Esselen apparently continued to live in the region until at least the 1840s, escaping the harsh conditions of the mission and disease due to their remoteness.

=== Europeans ===
The springs were visited early on by Europeans when the only access was by means of a difficult trail.

In May 1863 there was a brief "silver rush" in the Tassajara region. Eighteen mining claims were filed by at total of 135 men in the "Agua Caliente Mining District" ("supposed to contain gold and silver"). The first mining claim, which was named the "Vulcan Ledge", included "the stream of water called the 'Agua Caliente'" (that is, the Tassajara Hot Springs). ilt. J. E. Rust built a cabin in about 1869 but didn't stay long. In 1994, a skeleton was unearthed near Tassajara, and research suggested the individual had died about 150 years ago.

In March, 1885 Charles W. and Mary E. Quilty of San Jose bought the springs. Charles hired a surveyor and started work on the road from James Ranch to Chew's Ridge. The work from the summit down was done by unemployed Chinese miners and railroad builders from San Francisco and San Jose who used pick, shovel, and blasting powder. There were numerous unemployed Chinese miners and railroad builders in San Francisco and San Jose who worked for $.50 a day and provided their own food. Visitors traveled by stage over a rocky and steep road southward from Jamesburg. The last section was so steep that a 20 feet (6.1 m) long pine tree trunk was chained to the rear axles to slow the four horse stagecoach on the steep downgrade. The road is steep and narrow, such that a modern four-wheel drive vehicle can take an hour to cover the rough, winding 13.5 miles (21.7 km) narrow, rocky road leading from Jamesburg, California at 1,722 feet (525 m) over 4,881 feet (1,488 m) high Chews Ridge to the resort at 1,637 feet (499 m).

The Monterey County Board of Supervisors designated the trail to "Tesahara Springs" as a "public highway" in June, 1870, but work on a one-lane wagon road over Chews and Black Butte Ridges was not started until the spring of 1886. (Note: See also: Chews Ridge & Black Butte photographs, John Fedak, February 2006)

=== Ownership ===
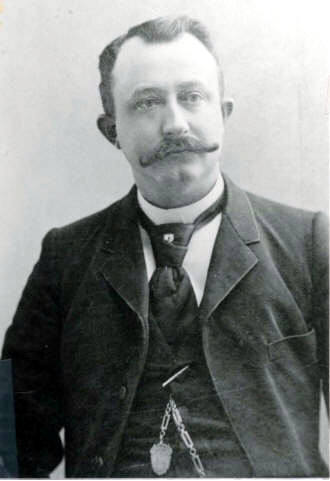
Charles Quilty and descendants owned Tassajara Hot Springs for 60 years.

Ownership of the land has passed through a number of individuals. The springs were first occupied by J. E Rust who built a cabin there. In 1875, Jack Borden began advertising the resort. In November 1876, he sold squatter's rights to William Hart. Hart received homestead patent on May 9, 1885, for 160 acres (65 ha) of land. He put up some tents and widened the trail in anticipation of the summer.

From 1888 to 1893 Quilty had a sandstone hotel built. He hired Henry Arnold of Jamesburg to blast the rock and cut the blocks. He had other improvements added yearly so that by 1909 there was ample accommodation for 75 people, although a larger number were put up in tents. A U.S. Post Office was established with Helen G. Quilty as Postmaster at the resort on May 11, 1912. In 1916 the horse drawn stage was replaced with an auto stage, which ran three times a week from Salinas to the springs, bringing visitors from all over the country to the springs. By 1932 his widow Helen was running two Pierce-Arrow stages daily from Salinas to the springs every day. One seated 9 and the other 11, and they also brought in groceries and supplies.

Members of the family would subsequently own it for 60 years. In 1901, their daughter May married the resort manager William Jeffrey, whose family owned the Jeffries Hotel in Salinas. Mary Quilty died in 1896, and Charles in 1914. After his death, his second wife Helen continued to operate the springs. In 1931, she remarried James B. Holohan, a former U.S. Marshal, warden of San Quentin Prison, and later a California State Senator. She sold the resort in 1927, repurchased it in 1933, and continued to operate it with her husband through 1945.

In May 1945, Ralph "Cocky" Meyers and James Bundguard bought Tassajara. Myers had worked at the springs as a young man, and was then owner of a large growing, packing, and shipping company in Salinas. Myers wanted to turn Tassajara into an exclusive resort. He planned to build a helicopter landing pad across from the plunges and add an aerial tram that would ferry guests across the stream and to the door of the hotel. He planned a helicopter shuttle service from the Salinas to Tassajara and try to gained the interest of San Francisco businessman.

Actor Phil Terry, who was married to Joan Crawford from 1942 to 1946, turned to real estate investment later in life. He remarried Rosalind Lee, who was a member of the Church family, who also owned Church Creek Ranch, another Monterey Forest inholding. The large stone hotel burned on September 9, 1949, and Frank and Angela Sappok bought it in October 1951. His family owned it for about 15 years until he died in an accident on the road into the resort. His wife sold it to Lester and Margaret (Allan) Hudson. Her father had previously owned Point Lobos, and had preserved it from development. Margaret had similar ambitions for Tassajara. They sold it in 1960 to two couples, Fred and Nancy Roscoe and Robert and Anna Beck. After only a month, the Becks bought the Roscoe's shares.

The Becks made many improvements and founded the non-profit Tassajara Wilderness Trust and began offering a series of workshops. They initially considered selling the Horse Pasture property, and possible buyers included publisher Lawrence Lane, who owned Sunset (magazine), the Monterey County Roughriders, and a vice-president of Pacific Gas & Electric. The San Francisco Zen Center also indicated interest, but did not have the financing, and had to resort to fundraising from individuals like Chester Carlson, the founder of Xerox. In December 1966 the Becks sold it for $300,000 to the San Francisco Zen Center, who renamed it the Zen Mountain Center. Their selling price was considerably less than they could have obtained from others.

=== The Horse Pasture ===
A section of 153 acres (62 ha) of land near the springs was nicknamed The Horse Pasture because the flat meadow was once used by wranglers to pasture livestock when passengers used a stage coach to visit the springs. The land is a mixture of chamise-dominated chaparral, mixed oak, Coulter Pine forest, and meadow. It was an inholding within the borders of the Ventana Wilderness within the Santa Lucia Mountains in Monterey County, California and was owned by the Beck family until 2016. The land offered obvious recreational opportunities and the potential for development as a residence or retreat. The Wilderness Trust identified the parcel as a high priority for conservation and addition to the Ventana Wilderness. In partnership with the Big Sur Land Trust, they bought the land for $1.1 million. The Wilderness Trust later conveyed to the United States Forest Service for inclusion in the Ventana Wilderness.

=== Fires ===
In September, 1949, a fire started in a cottage and quickly spread to the main building and the nearby forest. The fire trapped 40 guests and 22 employees before it was stopped at 1,400 acres (570 ha). The hot springs were completely surrounded by the Basin Complex fire in 2008. Five semi-trained staff members chose to remain behind, against the advice of professional fire-fighting personnel, and successfully defended the resort from the fire.

== Zen Center ==
The springs and surrounding property are privately owned by the San Francisco Zen Center, which purchased the land from Robert and Anna Beck. The site, now formally known as Zenshinji (Zen Heart-Mind Temple) is used year-round as a training monastery by Zen Center. From Memorial Day to Labor Day each year, SFZC rents the simple monastic accommodations as well as allowing day visitors to use the hot springs. Otherwise, it is used exclusively by the monks for intensive practice following a traditional schedule established in Tang Dynasty China.
