= Weaver Student Observatory =

Observatory in California, US

- Organization: Monterey Institute for Research in Astronomy
- Location: Marina, California
- Coordinates: 36°39′42″N 121°48′30″W
- Altitude: 3 m (9.8 ft)
- Website: www.mira.org/museum/wso.htm

Telescopes
- Unnamed Telescope: 14 inch (36 cm) Schmidt-Cassegrain

The Bette M. and William R. Weaver Student Observatory is an astronomical observatory owned and operated by Monterey Institute for Research in Astronomy (MIRA). It is located in Marina, California, adjacent to the campus of the California State University, Monterey Bay.

== See also ==
- List of observatories
- Monterey Institute for Research in Astronomy
- Oliver Observing Station
