= The Star of Bethlehem (2007 film) =

2007 film

The Star of Bethlehem is a 2007 documentary by Frederick A. "Rick" Larson to show what he found when he searched for clues about the Star of Bethlehem. Larson used the Starry Night astronomy computer program along with an article written by astronomer Craig Chester; based in part on the work of Ernest Martin. Larson also used details from the Christian Bible to find nine data points about the Star of Bethlehem which, according to Matthew 2, stopped over Bethlehem, bringing the Magi to Jesus.

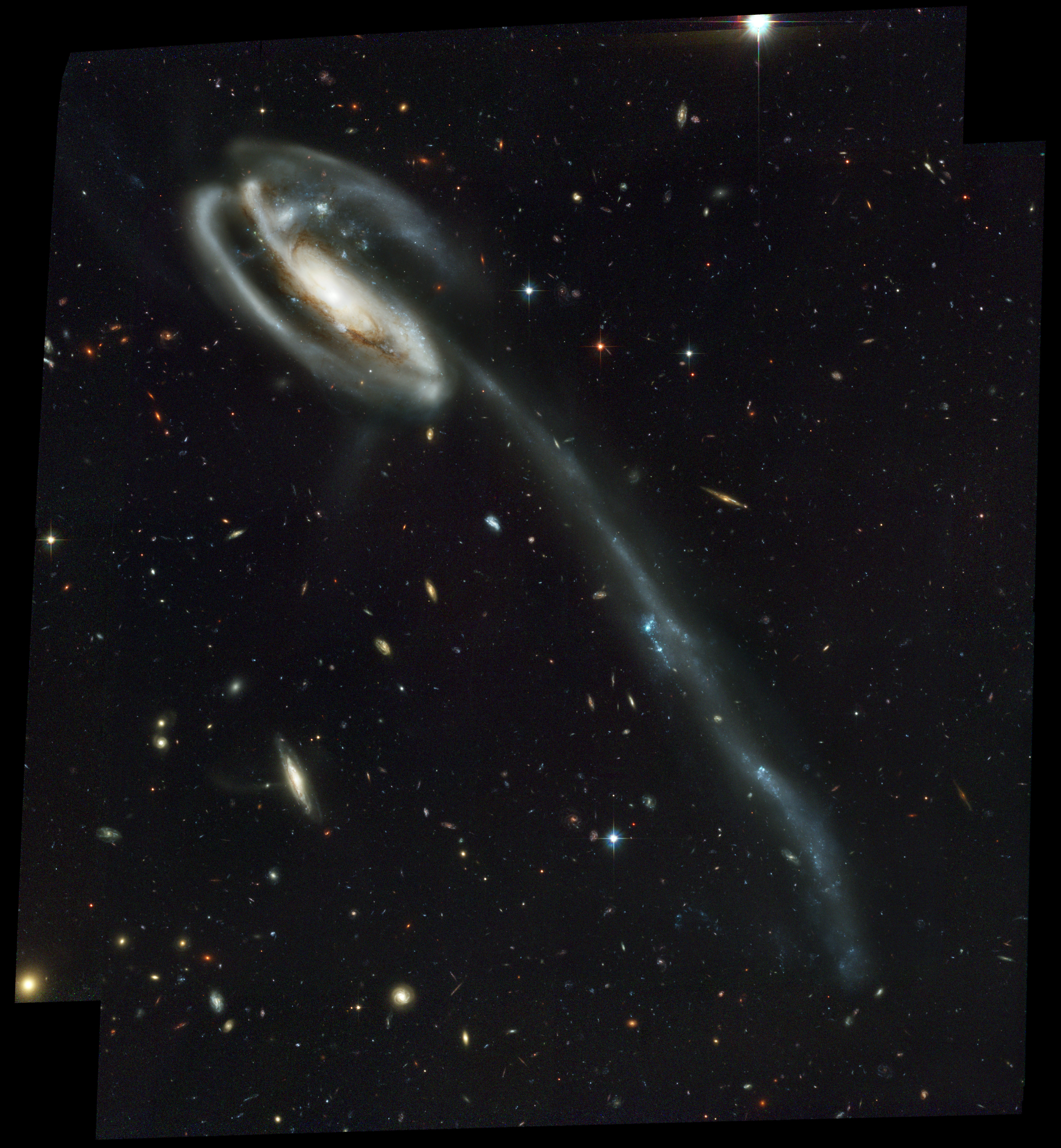
Larson shows the upper part of the Tadpole Galaxy taken by the Hubble Space Telescope to discuss the size of the Universe from God's perspective. The "dots" are not stars, but are galaxies (minutes 14:19-16:00).

== Background ==
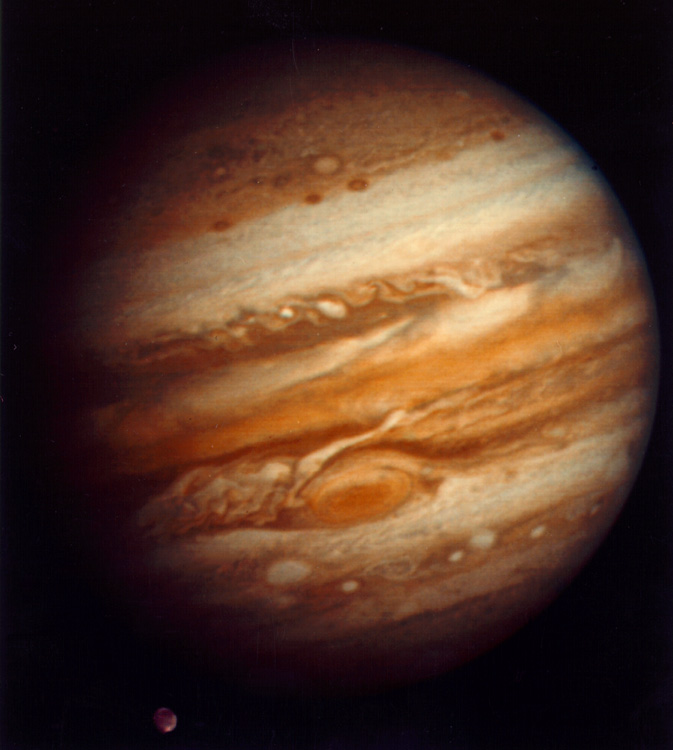
The planet Jupiter, which Larson thinks was part of a series of events involving the Star of Bethlehem.

Larson's interest in the Star of Bethlehem began when he needed to make a Christmas Star to accompany his Magi lawn ornaments he had made to be Christmas decorations, but did not know what the Star of Bethlehem was and needed to learn more.

Larson examined the text of Matthew, finding nine pieces of evidence in the nativity passage. The Star's nine data points are that it signified birth, it signified kingship, it was related to the Jewish nation, and it "rose in the East"; it was not known to Herod the Great; it appeared at a specific time; it endured over time; it was before the Magi as they traveled south to Bethlehem from Jerusalem, and then, according to the Bible, it stopped over the city of Bethlehem.

Using astronomy software to return to the skies over Judea by using Johannes Kepler's math to calculate positions of celestial objects, Larson thinks he found all nine elements found in the book of Matthew. He also believes that the Star of Bethlehem phenomenon was induced via the rendezvous of Jupiter and Regulus. as it was observed over Bethlehem during its triple conjunction on December 25, 2 BC. Larson believes King Herod the Great died in 1 BC, although almost all other experts, including astronomer David Hughes and astronomer Michael Molnar, believe Herod died in 4 BC. (In Molnar's book, The Star of Bethlehem: The Legacy of the Magi, he documents Jesus' birth as Saturday [Sabbath] April 17, 6 BC due to a triple conjunction in Aries). This is concurred by the Biblical scholar Colin R. Nicholl, who disagrees with the Martin-Larson hypothesis, and presents his views in his book The Great Christ Comet.

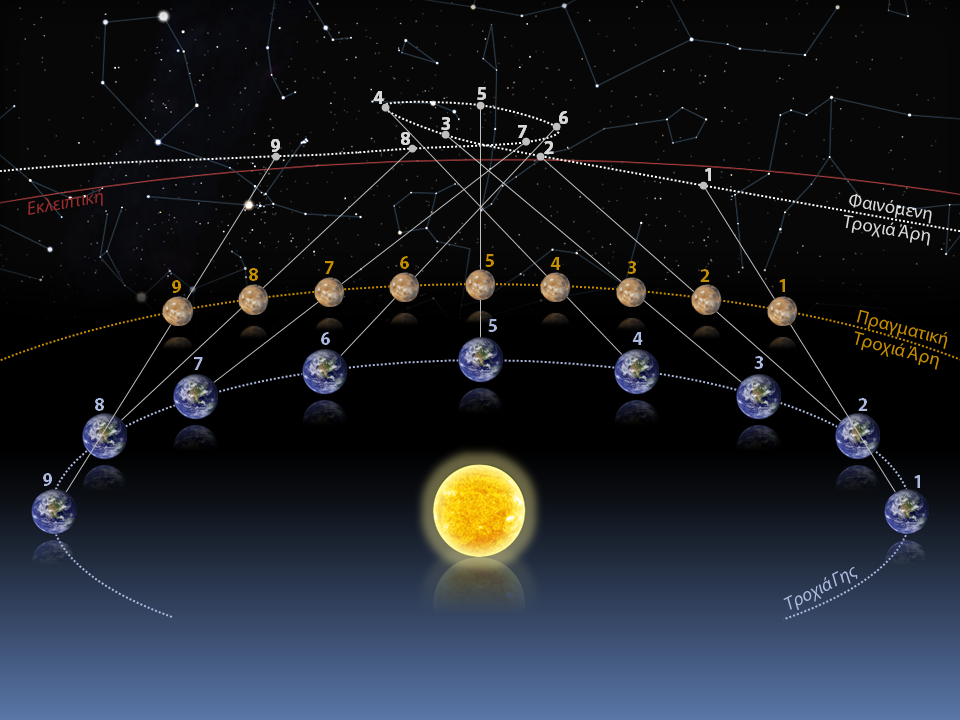
The Star of Bethlehem suggests the Star stood over Bethlehem in its retrograde motion. As earth overtakes other planets as it orbits, they appear to loop backwards. The planet Mars here shows this looping motion.

Once Larson found what he thinks is the time of Jesus Christ's birth, he looked for signs appearing in the heavens at possible times that fit the Passover, and believes the date of the Christ's (Messiah's) crucifixion was April 3, 33 AD on the Gregorian calendar. He also thinks he found astronomical phenomena related to a vision in the Book of Revelation.

== Production ==
Frederick Larson wrote the screenplay to The Star of Bethlehem and was co-executive producer along with Stephen McEveety. McEveety co-produced The Passion of the Christ, which won 22 awards including the People's Choice Award, the ASCAP Top Box Office Films Award, and an Academy Award for best cinematography. McEveety also co-produced Braveheart, which won 30 awards, including five Academy Awards, and whose films also include The Man Without a Face, Immortal Beloved, We Were Soldiers, and Payback. Stephen Vidano directed this film and Julie Davison Larson composed its music.

Larson released this documentary in 2007 (63 minutes) and in 2009 (65 minutes). It received five Doves from the Dove Foundation, which considered the film acceptable for all ages. Christian Cinema reviewer Angela Walker wrote, "The Star of Bethlehem doesn't have an MPAA rating, but the nature of the subject would probably earn it a PG for thematic elements (that being the birth of Jesus Christ)."

== See also ==
- Apparent retrograde motion
- Johannes Kepler
- Stephen McEveety
