= Fred Larson =

Fred or Frederick Larson may refer to:

- Fred Larson (American football) (1897–1977), American football player
- Fred Larson (politician) (1913–1994), Canadian member of Parliament
- Frederick Larson (filmmaker), American lawyer, law professor and filmmaker
