= Star Prophecy =

Messianic reading applied by Jewish Zealots and early Christians to Numbers 24:17

The Star Prophecy (or Star and Scepter prophecy) is a Messianic reading applied by Jewish Zealots and early Christians to Numbers 24:17.

== Bible narrative ==
אראנו ולא עתה אשורנו ולא קרוב דרך כוכב מיעקב וקם שבט מישראל ומחץ פאתי מואב וקרקר כל־בני־שת

Er’ennū wə-lō ‘attāh, ’ăšūrennū wə-lō qārōḇ; dāraḵ kōḵāḇ mî-Ya‘ăqōḇ, wəqām šêḇeṭ mî-Yiśrā’êl, ū-māḥaṣ pa’ăṯê Mō’āḇ, wə-qarqar kāl-bənê-Šêṯ.

I shall see him, but not now: I shall behold him, but not nigh: there shall come a Star out of Jacob, and a Sceptre shall rise out of Israel, and shall smite the corners of Moab, and destroy all the children of Sheth.

— Numbers 24:17

== Messianism ==
The prophecy was often employed during the troubled years that led up to the Jewish Revolt, the destruction of the Temple in Jerusalem (70 CE) and the suicidal last stand of the Sicarii at Masada in 73 CE. The Star Prophecy appears in the Qumran texts called the Dead Sea Scrolls. "This was the prophecy that was of such importance to all resistance groups in this period, including those responsible for the documents at Qumran and the revolutionaries who triggered the war against Rome, not to mention the early Christians".

The Star Prophecy was applied to the coming Messiah himself in contemporary radical Jewish documents, such as the apocalyptic War Scroll found at Qumran. In a pesher applied to the text from Numbers, the War Scroll's writer gives the following exegesis:

…by the hand of the Poor whom you have redeemed by Your Power and the peace of Your Mighty Wonders… by the hand of the Poor and those bent in the dust, You will deliver the enemies of all the lands and humble the mighty of the peoples to bring upon their heads the reward of the Wicked and justify the Judgement of Your Truth on all the sons of men.

Some have speculated that the Romanized Jewish historian Josephus, applied the prophecy to Vespasian, who was campaigning against the Jewish Zealots in Palestine, and "who was to come out of Israel and rule the world." According to Robert Karl Gnuse, it is not certain that Josephus was referring to the Star Prophecy:

"In his history Josephus observes that Vespasian was destined to be the world ruler who would come out of Judea, and not a Jewish messiah, as the revolutionaries had erroneously anticipated (War 6.312-314). … Josephus may have drawn upon the texts in Daniel 9:25-26 primarily and Genesis 49:10, Numbers 24:17, and Daniel 7:13-14 secondarily. He may have used an Essenic understanding of a messianic world ruler in addition."

The star has been externalized as an actual star in the sky, the Star of Bethlehem, in the narration of the Gospel of Matthew. The fulfilled Star Prophecy is one of numerous instances of the asserted fulfillment of prophecies that are a main theme of this text.

== Simon bar Kokhba ==
The prophecy was also applied to Simon bar Kokhba, messianic leader of the Second Jewish Revolt of 132, whose adopted name bar Kokhba means "Son of a Star" in Aramaic.
