= Frederick Larson (filmmaker) =

American lawyer and law professor (born 1953)

Frederick A. Larson
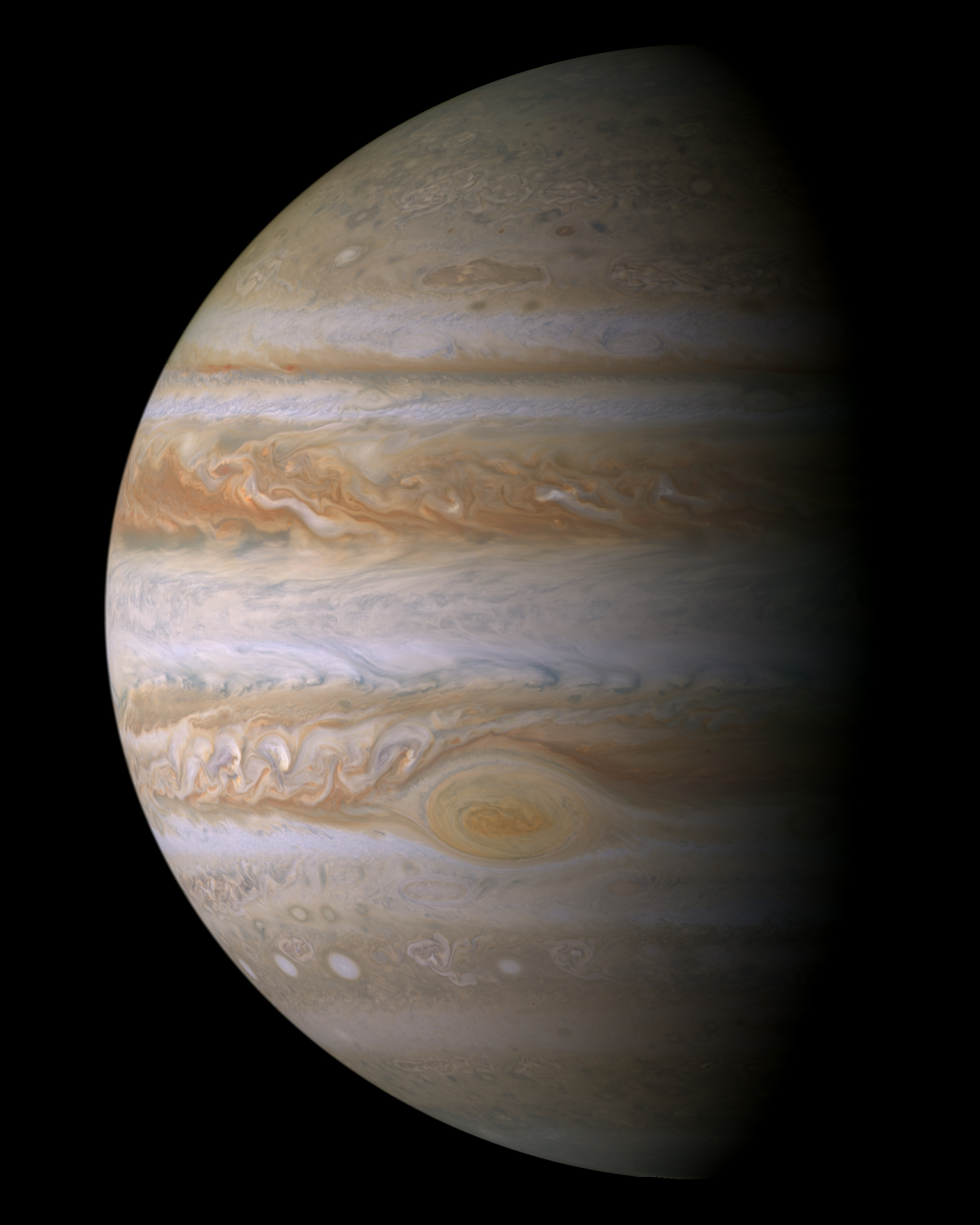
- Larson's research into the Star of Bethlehem led him to believe the evidence points to the planet Jupiter. This photo is from Cassini.
- Born: Frederick Anthony Heep Larson; March 26, 1953 (age 73); Los Angeles County, California, U.S.
- Education: University of Southern California (B.A.); University of Southern California Law Center (J.D.)
- Occupations: Filmmaker, intellectual property law attorney, law professor
- Years active: 2007–present
- Spouse: Julie Davison Larson

Frederick Anthony Heep "Rick" Larson (born March 26, 1953) is an American lawyer and law professor who became a filmmaker after he investigated the Star of Bethlehem and became a traveling speaker on the topic, then made his first documentary film The Star of Bethlehem about his findings in 2007. In March 2019 Larson released his second film, the documentary The Christ Quake, which had been in production since 2013.

== Education and primary career ==
Larson graduated from the University of Southern California with a bachelor's degree in philosophy and earned his Juris Doctor degree at the University of Southern California Law Center. His areas of legal expertise are intellectual property, business, and corporate law. Larson was voted Professor of the Year when he was a teacher at Texas A & M University.

== Films ==
=== The Star of Bethlehem ===
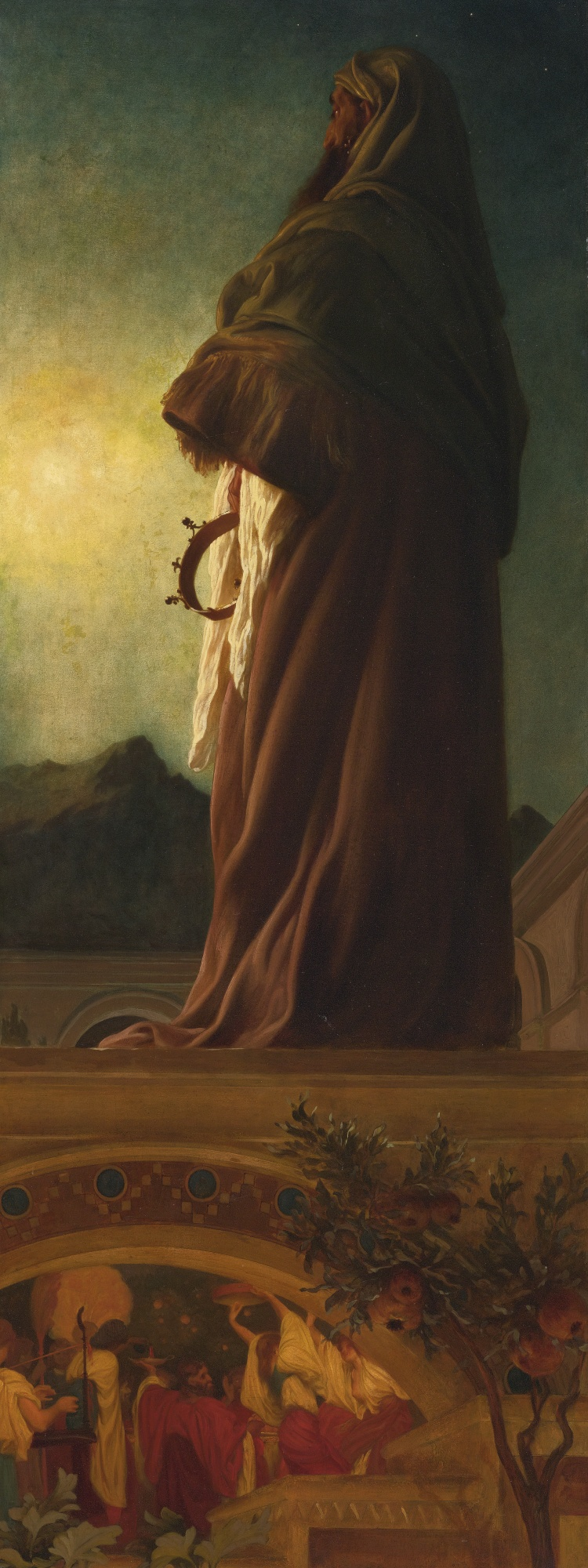
Frederic Leighton's - The Star of Bethlehem

Larson used the Starry Night astronomy software program after he became interested in the Christmas Star because he needed to produce one for the Magi he made as Christmas decorations for his yard, but did not know what to create.

Larson became intrigued with the Star after reading astronomer Craig Chester's article, based in part on the work of Ernest Martin about the Bethlehem Star being a possible actual event. Chester, a co-founder of the Monterey Institute for Research in Astronomy, thought the planetary conjunctions of 2 BC were a more plausible explanation for what the Magi would have seen than events found in earlier dates. Larson thinks astronomical events in 3-2 BC fit the evidence found in the Bible. He also believes King Herod the Great died in 1 BC, although others, including astronomer David Hughes and astronomer Mike Molnar, believe Herod died in 4 BC.

Larson examined the biblical account in the Gospel of Matthew, chapter 2 and located nine qualities of Bethlehem's Star: It signified birth, it signified kingship, it was related to the Jewish nation, and it rose "in the East"; furthermore, King Herod had not been aware of it; it appeared at an exact time; it endured over time; and, according to the book of Matthew, it was before the Magi as they traveled south from Jerusalem to Bethlehem, then it stopped over Bethlehem.

Larson wrote the screenplay and was co-executive producer with Stephen McEveety, whose films include The Passion of the Christ and Braveheart.

=== The Christ Quake ===
After he investigated the Star of Bethlehem, Larson began work on a second film, The Christ Quake, focused on uncovering physical evidence of the earthquake the Bible says took place when Christ died on the cross. It is based on the book of Matthew 27:51, which says, "and the earth did quake, and the rocks rent". On May 21, 2019, the DVD was released in English and in Spanish. In addition to appearing in the documentary, Larson was its screenwriter and executive producer.

=== God of Heaven and Earth ===
A November 5, 2023 theater film release with a documentary exposition of the Bethlehem star story and earthquake at Christ's crucifixion story. Larson's presentation was accompanied by astronomical and geological evidence with interviews of experts in both fields.

== Personal life ==
Larson studied under Francis Schaeffer in Switzerland at the L'Abri Christian community.

He founded the STAR project, a nonprofit organization that promotes unity among Christians of many denominations. On July 28, 2016, Julie Davison Larson posted a message from Rick Larson in which he said he was married to her, that she was composing the music for every instrument of the orchestra for The Christ Quake film, and added, "I'm the one that cooks dinner when she is scoring."

== See also ==
- Apparent retrograde motion
- Johannes Kepler
- Stephen McEveety
