= Pious fiction =

Grouping of narrative

A pious fiction is a narrative that is presented as true by the author, but is considered by others to be fictional albeit produced with an altruistic motivation. The term is sometimes used pejoratively to suggest that the author of the narrative was deliberately misleading readers for selfish or deceitful reasons. The term is often used in religious contexts, sometimes referring to passages in religious texts.

== Etymology ==
An early use of the phrase was in 1862 in the British newspaper The Examiner.

== Examples ==
=== Religious context ===
- Historical-critical approaches to the New Testament sometimes views stories such as the Virgin Birth, the Visit of the Magi to Jesus, and others, as pious fictions.
- The relationship between the modern celebration of Christmas and the historical birth of Jesus has also been described as such.
- Minimalist interpretations of the Hebrew Bible (i.e. the Tanakh or the Protestant Old Testament) often consider much of the Tanakh/Jewish Bible (but not the New Testament) to be a pious fiction, such as the conquests of Joshua, and the historiography of the Pentateuch. The Book of Daniel has also been described as a pious fiction, with the purpose of providing encouragement to Jews.
- The Book of Mormon, one of the Standard Works of the Latter Day Saint Movement, has been described as a hoax or pious fiction, and it is not accepted as containing divine revelation by those outside the Latter Day Saint movement (an umbrella term encompassing many sects, many of which describe themselves as Mormon, and some of which, such as the RLDS, do not describe themselves as Mormon).
- The Koran, the sacred text of Islam, has been described as a pious fiction by several authors. The hadith, likewise, have been described as a collection of various pious fictions by several authors.
- Dale Eickelman writes that Muslim jurists employ a pious fiction when they assert that Islamic law is invariant, when in fact it is subject to change.

=== Other contexts ===
- Fredrick Pike describes some morale-boosting efforts during the Great Depression as pious fictions.

== See also ==
- Morality play
- Myth
- Noble lie
- Pious fraud
