= Oliver Observing Station =

Observatory in California, US

- Organization: Monterey Institute for Research in Astronomy
- Location: Ventana Wilderness
- Coordinates: 36°18′20″N 121°34′00″W
- Altitude: 5,000 feet (1,500 meters)
- Website: www.mira.org

Telescopes
- Unnamed Telescope: 36 inches (91 cm) Cassegrain

The Oliver Observing Station is an independent professional astronomical observatory named after Barnard M. Oliver. It is owned and operated by The Monterey Institute for Research in Astronomy (MIRA).

== Site ==
The observatory is in the Los Padres National Forest, about 20 miles east and south of Carmel Valley, California, a few miles from the Tassajara monastery. The site was first publicized by Walker (1970) and more fully characterized by Hutter et al. (1997) as having sub-arcsecond astronomical seeing and a high number of photometric-quality nights per year. It is well protected from light pollution to the south by the Ventana Wilderness inside the Los Padres National Forest and to the west by the Pacific Ocean. The northern direction is impacted by light from the Monterey-Salinas complex and San Jose. The east is moderately dark, due to the highly agriculturally-productive Salinas Valley but is slowly becoming more light polluted, especially in the area of Soledad.

== Facilities ==
The primary telescope is the 36 inch Cassegrain reflector; the first telescope built by Dr. Frank Melsheimer (now DFM Engineering). The mirror was the mirror from Project Stratoscope, the precursor experiment to the Hubble Space Telescope.

Instrumentation includes a dual-ported Cassegrain spectrograph, echelle spectrographs, and direct cameras used for imaging and precision photometry and polarimetry.

== See also ==
- List of observatories
- Monterey Institute for Research in Astronomy
- Weaver Student Observatory
