= Star of Bethlehem =

Biblical star revealing Christ's birth

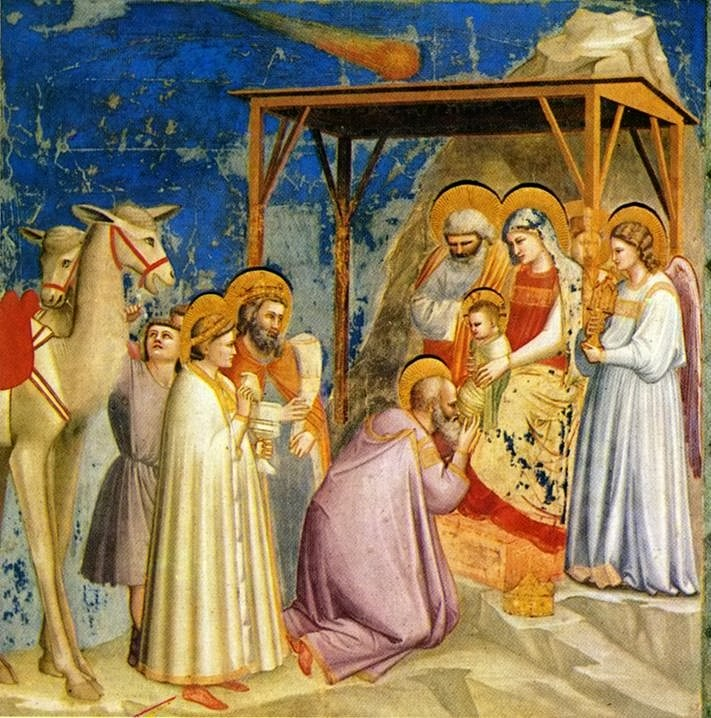
Adoration of the Magi by Florentine painter Giotto di Bondone (1267–1337). The Star of Bethlehem is shown as a comet above the child. Giotto witnessed an appearance of Halley's Comet in 1301.

The Star of Bethlehem, or Christmas Star, appears in the nativity of Jesus as accounted in the Gospel of Matthew chapter 2, where "wise men from the East" (Magi) are inspired by the star to travel to Jerusalem.

There, they meet King Herod of Judea, and ask him:

Where is He who has been born King of the Jews? For we have seen His star in the East and have come to worship Him.

Herod calls together his scribes and priests who, quoting a verse from the Book of Micah, interpret it as a prophecy that the Jewish Messiah would be born in Bethlehem to the south of Jerusalem. Secretly intending to find and kill the Messiah in order to preserve his own kingship, Herod invites the wise men to return to him on their way home.

The star leads them to Jesus' Bethlehem birthplace, where they worship him and give him gifts. The wise men are then given a divine warning not to return to Herod, so they return home by a different route.

Many Christians believe the star was a miraculous sign. Some theologians claimed that the star fulfilled a prophecy, known as the Star Prophecy. Astronomers have made several attempts to link the star to unusual celestial events, such as a conjunction of Jupiter and Saturn or Jupiter and Venus, a comet, or a supernova. Some modern scholars do not consider the story to be describing a historical event, but rather a pious fiction added later to the main gospel account.

The subject is a favorite at planetarium shows during the Christmas season. However, most ancient sources and Church tradition generally indicate that the wise men visited Bethlehem sometime after Jesus' birth. The visit is traditionally celebrated on Epiphany (January 6) in Western Christianity.

The account in the Gospel of Matthew describes Jesus with the broader Greek word παιδίον, paidíon, which can mean either "infant" or "child" rather than the more specific word for infant, βρέφος, bréphos. This possibly implies that some time has passed since the birth. However, the word παιδίον, paidíon is also used in the Gospel of Luke specifically concerning Jesus' birth and his later presentation at the temple. Herod I has all male Hebrew babies in the area up to age two killed in the Massacre of the Innocents.

== Matthew's narrative ==
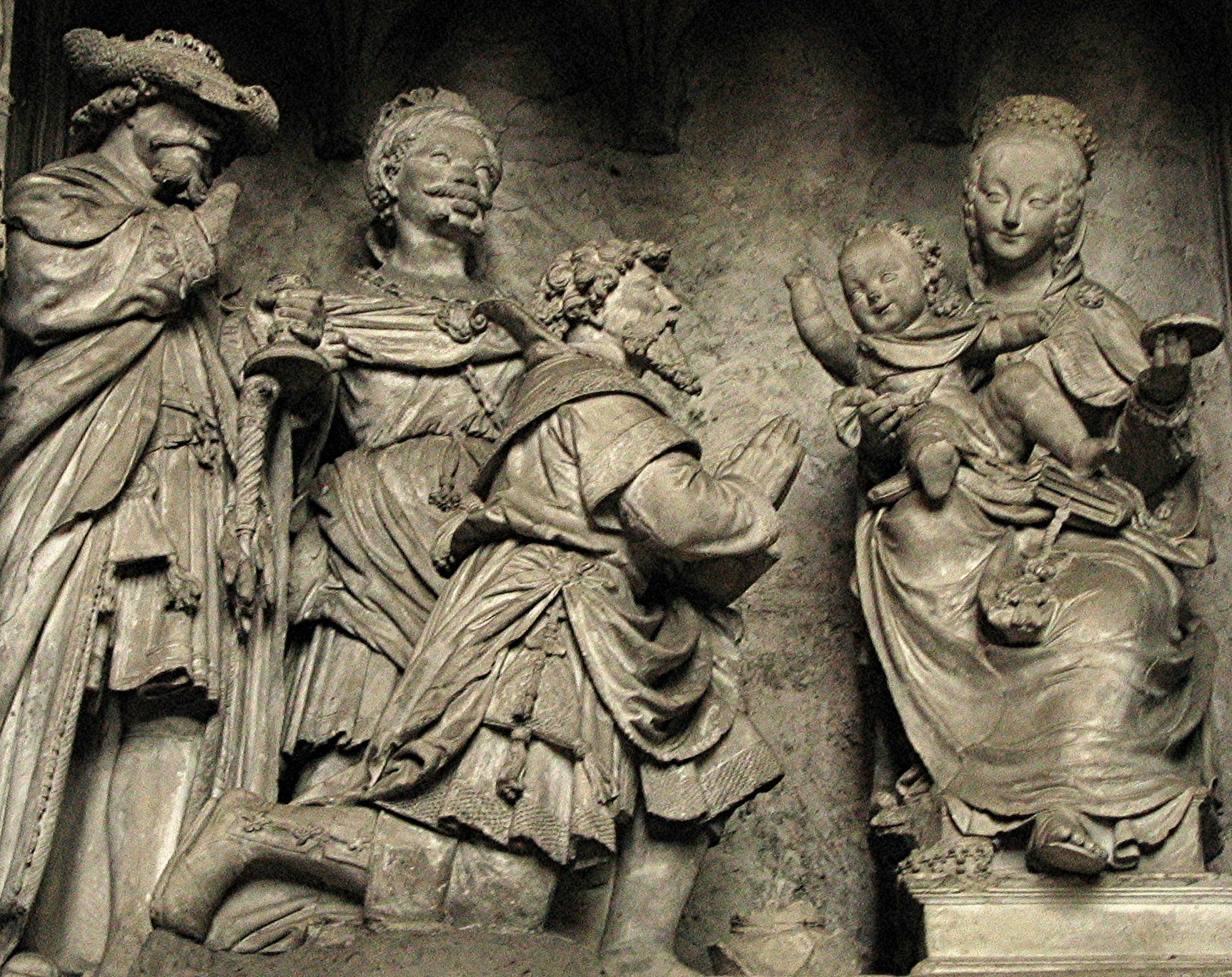
Adoration of the Magi, Chartres Cathedral, by Jehan de Beauce, France, 16th century

The Gospel of Matthew tells how the Magi (often translated as "wise men", but more accurately astrologers) arrive at the court of Herod in Jerusalem and tell the king of a star which signifies the birth of the King of the Jews:

Now when Jesus was born in Bethlehem of Judea in the days of Herod the king, behold, wise men from the East came to Jerusalem, saying, ^{2}"Where is he who has been born king of the Jews? For we have seen his star in the East, and have come to worship him." ^{3}When Herod the king heard this, he was troubled, and all Jerusalem with him; ^{4}and assembling all the chief priests and scribes of the people, he inquired of them where the Christ was to be born. ^{5}They told him, "In Bethlehem of Judea; for so it is written by the prophet:

^{6}'And you, O Bethlehem, in the land of Judah,
are by no means least among the rulers of Judah;
for from you shall come a ruler
who will govern my people Israel.'"

^{7}Then Herod summoned the wise men secretly and ascertained from them what time the star appeared; ^{8}and he sent them to Bethlehem, saying, "Go and search diligently for the child, and when you have found him bring me word, that I too may come and worship him." ^{9}When they had heard the king they went their way; and lo, the star which they had seen in the East went before them, till it came to rest over the place where the child was. ^{10}When they saw the star, they rejoiced exceedingly with great joy; ^{11}and going into the house they saw the child with Mary his mother, and they fell down and worshiped him. Then, opening their treasures, they offered him gifts, gold and frankincense and myrrh.

— Matthew 2:1–11, Revised Standard Version

Herod is "troubled", not because of the appearance of the star, but because the Magi have told him that a "king of the Jews" had been born, which he understands to refer to the Messiah, a leader of the Jewish people whose coming was believed to be foretold in scripture. He asks his advisors where the Messiah would be born. They answer Bethlehem, birthplace of King David, and quote the prophet Micah. (Note: Matthew 2:5–6. Matthew's version is a conflation of Micah 5:2 and 2 Samuel 5:2.) The king passes this information along to the Magi.

In a dream, they are warned not to return to Jerusalem, so they leave for their own country by another route. When Herod realizes he has been tricked, he orders the execution of all male children in Bethlehem "two years old and younger," based on the age the child could be in regard to the information the magi had given him concerning the time the star first appeared. (Note: Matthew 2:16 This is presented as a fulfillment of a prophecy and echoes the killing of firstborn by pharaoh in Exodus 11:1–12:36.)

Joseph, warned in a dream, takes his family to Egypt for their safety. The gospel links the escape to a verse from scripture, which it interprets as a prophecy: "Out of Egypt I called my son." This was a reference to the departure of the Hebrews from Egypt under Moses, so the quote suggests that Matthew saw the life of Jesus as recapitulating the story of the Jewish people, with Judea representing Egypt and Herod standing in for pharaoh.

After Herod dies, Joseph and his family return from Egypt, and settle in Nazareth in Galilee. This is also said to be a fulfillment of a prophecy ("He will be called a Nazorean," (NRSV) which could be attributed to Judges 13:5 regarding the birth of Samson and the Nazirite vow. The word Nazareth is related to the word netzer which means "sprout", and which some Bible commentators think refers to Isaiah 11:1: "There shall come forth a Rod from the stem of Jesse, And a Branch shall grow out of his roots." (Note: Judges 13:5–7 is sometimes identified as the source for Matthew 2:23 because the Septuagint's ναζιραιον (Nazirite) resembles Matthew's Ναζωραῖος (Nazorean). However, few scholars accept the view that Jesus was a Nazirite.)

== Explanations ==
=== Pious fiction ===
Scholars who see the gospel nativity stories as later apologetic accounts created to establish the messianic status of Jesus regard the Star of Bethlehem as a pious fiction. Aspects of Matthew's account which have raised questions of the historical event include: Matthew is the only one of the four gospels which mentions either the Star of Bethlehem or the Magi. Some scholars suggest that Jesus was born in Nazareth, and that the Bethlehem nativity narratives were later additions to the gospels intended to present his birth as the fulfillment of prophecy.

According to Bart D. Ehrman, the Matthew account conflicts with that given in the Gospel of Luke, in which the family of Jesus already lives in Nazareth, travel to Bethlehem for the census, and return home almost immediately.

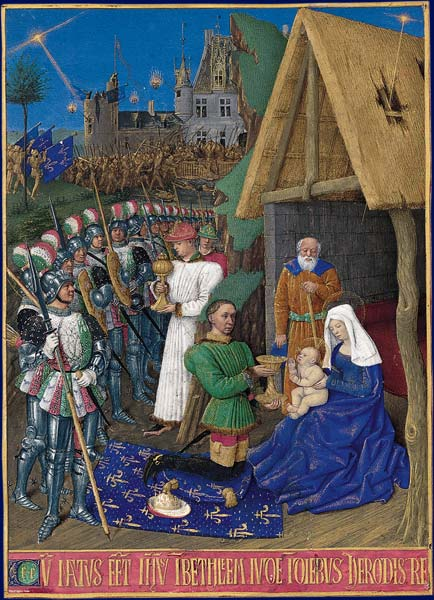
Adoration of the Magi, by Jean Fouquet (15th century). The Star of Bethlehem can be seen in the top right. The soldiers and castle in the background may represent the Battle of Castillon (1453).

=== Fulfillment of prophecy ===
The ancients believed that astronomical phenomena were connected to terrestrial events. Miracles were routinely associated with the birth of important people, including the Hebrew patriarchs, as well as Greek and Roman heroes.

The Star of Bethlehem is traditionally linked to the Star Prophecy in the Book of Numbers:

I see him, but not now;
I behold him, but not near;
A Star shall come out of Jacob;
A Scepter shall rise out of Israel,
And batter the brow of Moab,
And destroy all the sons of tumult.

— Numbers 24:17, NKJV

Although possibly intended to refer to a time that was long past, since the kingdom of Moab had long ceased to exist by the time the Gospels were being written, this passage had become widely seen as a reference to the coming of a Messiah. It was, for example, cited by Josephus, who believed it referred to Emperor Vespasian. Origen, one of the most influential early Christian theologians, connected this prophecy with the Star of Bethlehem:

If, then, at the commencement of new dynasties, or on the occasion of other important events, there arises a comet so called, or any similar celestial body, why should it be matter of wonder that at the birth of Him who was to introduce a new doctrine to the human race, and to make known His teaching not only to Jews, but also to Greeks, and to many of the barbarous nations besides, a star should have arisen? Now I would say, that with respect to comets there is no prophecy in circulation to the effect that such and such a comet was to arise in connection with a particular kingdom or a particular time; but with respect to the appearance of a star at the birth of Jesus there is a prophecy of Balaam recorded by Moses to this effect: There shall arise a star out of Jacob, and a man shall rise up out of Israel.

Origen suggested that the Magi may have decided to travel to Jerusalem when they "conjectured that the man whose appearance had been foretold along with that of the star, had actually come into the world".

The Magi are sometimes called "kings" because of the belief that they fulfill prophecies in Isaiah and Psalms concerning a journey to Jerusalem by gentile kings. Isaiah mentions gifts of gold and incense. In the Septuagint, the Greek translation of the Old Testament probably used by Matthew, these gifts are given as gold and frankincense, similar to Matthew's "gold, frankincense, and myrrh." The gift of myrrh symbolizes mortality, according to Origen.

While Origen argued for a naturalistic explanation, John Chrysostom viewed the star as purely miraculous: "How then, tell me, did the star point out a spot so confined, just the space of a manger and shed, unless it left that height and came down, and stood over the very head of the young child? And at this the evangelist was hinting when he said, "Lo, the star went before them, till it came and stood over where the young Child was."

=== Astronomical object ===
Although the word magi (Greek μαγοι) is usually translated as "wise men," in this context it probably means 'astronomer'/'astrologer'. The involvement of astrologers in the story of the birth of Jesus was problematic for the early Church, because they condemned astrology as demonic a widely cited explanation was that of Tertullian, who suggested that astrology was allowed 'only until the time of the Gospel'.

==== Planetary conjunction ====
Jerusalem sky on November 12, 7 BC.

In 1614, German astronomer Johannes Kepler determined that a series of three conjunctions of the planets Jupiter and Saturn occurred in the year 7 BC. He argued (incorrectly) that a planetary conjunction could create a nova, which he linked to the Star of Bethlehem. Modern calculations show that there was a gap of nearly a degree (approximately twice a diameter of the Moon) between the planets, so these conjunctions were not visually impressive. An ancient almanac has been found in Babylon which covers the events of this period, but does not indicate that the conjunctions were of any special interest. In the 20th century, Professor Karlis Kaufmanis, an astronomer, argued that this was an astronomical event where Jupiter and Saturn were in a triple conjunction in the constellation Pisces. Archaeologist and Assyriologist Simo Parpola has also suggested this explanation.

In 3–2 BC, there was a series of seven conjunctions, including three between Jupiter and Regulus and a strikingly close conjunction between Jupiter and Venus near Regulus on June 17, 2 BC. "The fusion of two planets would have been a rare and awe-inspiring event", according to Roger Sinnott. Another Venus–Jupiter conjunction occurred earlier in August, 3 BC. While these events occurred after the generally accepted date of 4 BC for the death of Herod, they did occur during the reign of Caesar Augustus (who is referenced in the Gospel of Luke), and early Christian historians Eusebius and Clement of Alexandria calculated the birth of Jesus to 3-2 BC. Since the conjunction would have been seen in the west at sunset it could not have led the magi south from Jerusalem to Bethlehem.

==== Comet ====
Other writers highly suggest that the star was a comet. Halley's Comet was visible in 12 BC and another object, possibly a comet or nova, was seen by Korean and Chinese stargazers in about 5 BC. This object was observed for over seventy days, possibly with no movement recorded (Book of Han, chapter 28). Ancient writers described comets as "hanging over" specific cities, just as the Star of Bethlehem was said to have "stood over" the "place" where Jesus was (the town of Bethlehem). However, this is generally thought unlikely as in ancient times comets were generally seen as bad omens. NASA scientist Mark Matney has calculated the orbit of the comet recorded in the Book of Han, which could have passed very close to Earth in early June of the year 5 BC, exhibiting a "temporary geosynchronous" motion. The comet explanation has been recently promoted by Colin Nicholl. His theory involves a hypothetical comet which could have appeared in 6 BC.

==== Double occultation on Saturday (Sabbath) April 17, 6 BC ====
Astronomer Michael R. Molnar argues that the "star in the east" refers to an astronomical event with astrological significance in the context of ancient Greek astrology. He suggests a link between the Star of Bethlehem and a double occultation of Jupiter by the Moon on March 20 and April 17 of 6 BC in Aries, particularly the second occultation on April 17. Occultations of planets by the Moon are quite common, but Firmicus Maternus, an astrologer to Roman Emperor Constantine, wrote that an occultation of Jupiter in Aries was a sign of the birth of a divine king. He argues that Aries rather than Pisces was the zodiac symbol for Judea, a fact that would affect previous interpretations of astrological material. Molnar's theory was debated by scientists, theologians, and historians during a colloquium on the Star of Bethlehem at the Netherlands' University of Groningen in October 2014. Harvard astronomer Owen Gingerich supports Molnar's explanation but noted technical questions. "The gospel story is one in which King Herod was taken by surprise," said Gingerich. "So it wasn't that there was suddenly a brilliant new star sitting there that anybody could have seen [but] something more subtle." Astronomer David A. Weintraub says, "If Matthew's wise men actually undertook a journey to search for a newborn king, the bright star didn't guide them; it only told them when to set out."

There is an explanation given that the events were quite close to the Sun and would not have been visible to the naked eye.

==== Regulus, Jupiter, and Venus ====
Attorney Frederick Larson examined the biblical account in the Gospel of Matthew, chapter 2 and found the following nine qualities of Bethlehem's Star: It signified birth, it signified kingship, it was related to the Jewish nation, and it rose "in the East"; King Herod had not been aware of it; it appeared at an exact time; it endured over time; and, according to Matthew, it was in front of the Magi when they traveled south from Jerusalem to Bethlehem, and then stopped over Bethlehem.

Using the Starry Night astronomy software, and an article written by astronomer Craig Chester based on the work of archeologist and historian Ernest L. Martin, Larson thinks all nine characteristics of the Star of Bethlehem are found in events that took place in the skies of 3–2 BC. Highlights include a triple conjunction of Jupiter, called the king planet, with the fixed star Regulus, called the king star, starting in September 3 BC. Larson believes that may be the time of Jesus' conception.

By June of 2 BC, nine months later, the human gestation period, Jupiter had continued moving in its orbit around the Sun and appeared in close conjunction with Venus in June of 2 BC. In Hebrew Jupiter is called Sedeq, meaning "righteousness", a term also used for the Messiah, and suggested that because the planet Venus represents love and fertility, so Chester had suggested astrologers would have viewed the close conjunction of Jupiter and Venus as indicating a coming new king of Israel, and Herod would have taken them seriously. Astronomer Dave Reneke independently found the June 2 BC planetary conjunction, and noted it would have appeared as a "bright beacon of light". According to Chester, the disks of Jupiter and Venus would have appeared to touch and there has not been as close a Venus-Jupiter conjunction since then.

Jupiter next continued to move and then stopped in its apparent retrograde motion on December 25 of 2 BC over the town of Bethlehem. Since planets in their orbits have a "stationary point", a planet moves eastward through the stars but, "As it approaches the opposite point in the sky from the sun, it appears to slow, come to a full stop, and move backward (westward) through the sky for some weeks. Again it slows, stops, and resumes its eastward course," said Chester. The date of December 25 that Jupiter appeared to stop while in retrograde took place in the season of Hanukkah, and is the date later chosen to celebrate Christmas.

==== Heliacal rising ====
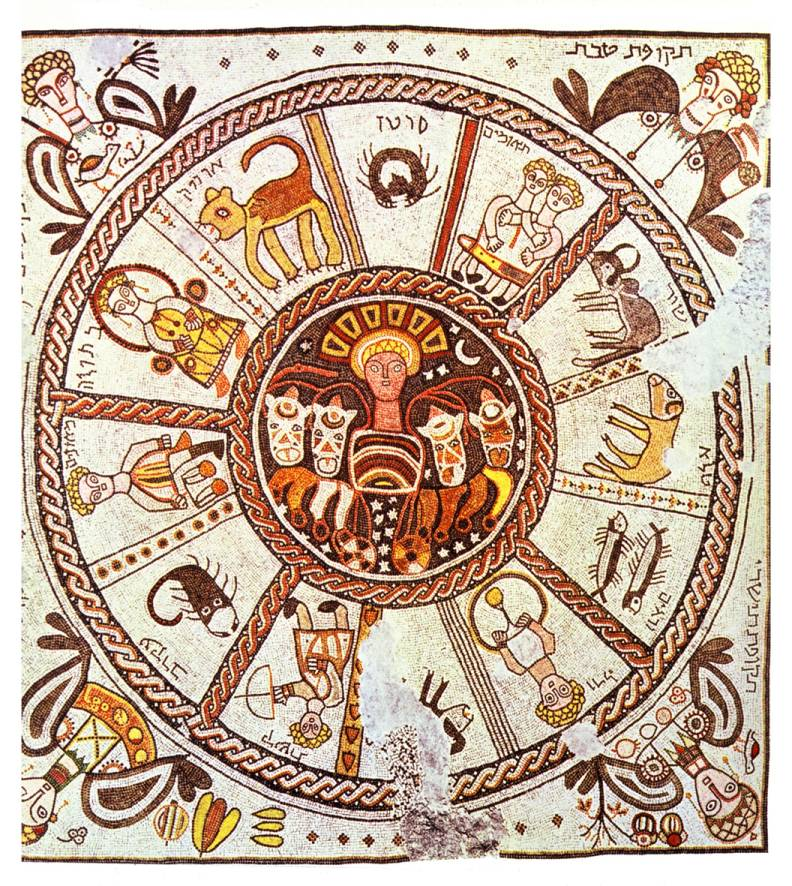
A zodiac from a 6th-century mosaic at a synagogue in Beit Alpha, Israel

The Magi told Herod that they saw the star "in the East," or according to some translations, "at its rising", which may imply the routine appearance of a constellation, or an asterism. One theory interprets the phrase in Matthew 2:2, "in the east," as an astrological term concerning a "heliacal rising." This translation was proposed by Edersheim and Heinrich Voigt, among others. The view was rejected by the philologist Franz Boll (1867–1924). Two modern translators of ancient astrological texts insist that the text does not use the technical terms for either a heliacal or an acronycal rising of a star. However, one concedes that Matthew may have used layman's terms for a rising.

==== Supernova ====
Physicist Frank Tipler has proposed that the star of Bethlehem was a supernova or hypernova occurring in the nearby Andromeda Galaxy. Although it is difficult to detect a supernova remnant in another galaxy, or obtain an accurate date of when it occurred, supernova remnants have been detected in Andromeda.

Another theory is the more likely supernova of February 23 4 BC, which is speculated to be PSR 1913+16 or the Hulse-Taylor Pulsar. It is said to have appeared in the constellation of Aquila, near the intersection of the winter colure and the equator of date. The nova was "recorded in China, Korea, and Palestine" (probably meaning the Biblical account).

A nova or comet was recorded in China in 4 BC. "In the reign of Emperor Ai, in the third year of the Jianping period. In the third month, day jiyou, there was a rising bo at Hegu" (Book of Han, chapter 11). The date is equivalent to April 24, 4 BC. This identifies the date when it was first observed in China. It was also recorded in Korea: "In the fifty-fourth year of Hyokkose Wang, in the spring, second month, day chi-yu, a po-hsing appeared at Hoku" (Samguk Sagi, The Historical Record of the Three Kingdoms). The Korean text may have been corrupted because Ho (1962) points out that "the chi-yu day did not fall in the second month that year but on the first month" (February 23) and on the third month (April 24). The original must have read "day chi-yu, first month" (February 23) or "day chi-yu, third month" (April 24). The latter would coincide with the date in the Chinese records although professor Ho suggests the date was "probably February 23, 4 BC."

== Relating the star historically to Jesus' birth ==
If the story of the Star of Bethlehem described an actual event, it might identify the year Jesus was born. The Gospel of Matthew describes the birth of Jesus as taking place when Herod was king. According to Josephus, Herod died after a lunar eclipse and before a Passover Feast. Some scholars suggested dates in 5 BC, because it allows seven months for the events Josephus documented between the lunar eclipse and the Passover rather than the 29 days allowed by lunar eclipse in 4 BC. Others suggest it was an eclipse in 1 BC. The narrative implies that Jesus was born sometime between the first appearance of the star and the appearance of the Magi at Herod's court. That the king is said to have ordered the execution of boys two years of age and younger implies that the Star of Bethlehem appeared within the preceding two years. Some scholars date the birth of Jesus as 6–4 BC, while others suggest Jesus' birth was in 3–2 BC.

The Gospel of Luke says the census from Caesar Augustus took place when Quirinius was governor of Syria. Tipler suggests this took place in AD 6, nine years after the death of Herod, and that the family of Jesus left Bethlehem shortly after the birth. Some scholars explain the apparent disparity as an error on the part of the author of the Gospel of Luke, concluding that he was more concerned with creating a symbolic narrative than a historical account, and was either unaware of, or indifferent to, the chronological difficulty.

However, there is some debate among Bible translators about the correct reading of Luke 2:2 ("Αὕτη ἀπογραφὴ πρώτη ἐγένετο ἡγεμονεύοντος τῆς Συρίας Κυρηνίου"). Instead of translating the registration as taking place "when" Quirinius was governor of Syria, some versions translate it as "before" or use "before" as an alternative, which Harold Hoehner, F.F. Bruce, Ben Witherington and others have suggested may be the correct translation. While not in agreement, Emil Schürer also acknowledged that such a translation can be justified grammatically. According to Josephus, the tax census conducted by the Roman senator Quirinius particularly irritated the Jews, and was one of the causes of the Zealot movement of armed resistance to Rome. From this perspective, Luke may have been trying to differentiate the census at the time of Jesus' birth from the tax census mentioned in Acts 5:37 that took place under Quirinius at a later time. One ancient writer identified the census at Jesus' birth, not with taxes, but with a universal pledge of allegiance to the emperor.

Jack Finegan noted some early writers' reckoning of the regnal years of Augustus are the equivalent to 3/2 BC, or 2 BC or later for the birth of Jesus, including Irenaeus (3/2 BC), Clement of Alexandria (3/2 BC), Tertullian (3/2 BC), Julius Africanus (3/2 BC), Hippolytus of Rome (3/2 BC), Hippolytus of Thebes (3/2 BC), Origen (3/2 BC), Eusebius of Caesarea (3/2 BC), Epiphanius of Salamis (3/2 BC), Cassiodorus Senator (3 BC), Paulus Orosius (2 BC), Dionysus Exiguus (1 BC), and Chronographer of the Year 354 (AD 1). Finegan places the death of Herod in 1 BC, and says if Jesus was born two years or less before Herod the Great died, the birth of Jesus would have been in 3 or 2 BC. Finegan also notes the Alogi reckoned Jesus's birth with the equivalent of 4 BC or AD 9.

== Religious interpretations ==
=== Catholicism ===
The Catholic Church has no say on the Star of Bethlehem, except that it led the Magi to Jesus. Various theologians have speculated on the star's nature: star, angel, light, person, bird, illusion, hallucination, natural phenomenon, etc.

=== Eastern Orthodoxy ===
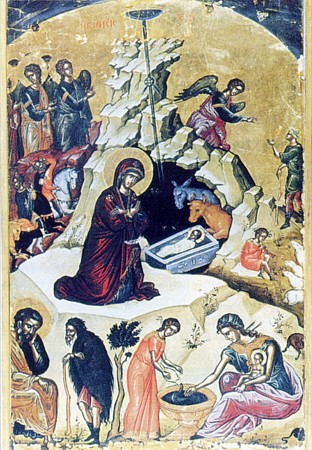
Russian icon of the Nativity. The Star of Bethlehem is depicted at the center top as a dark semicircle, with a single ray coming down.

In the Eastern Orthodox Church, the Star of Bethlehem is interpreted as a miraculous event of symbolic and pedagogical significance, regardless of whether it coincides with a natural phenomenon; a sign sent by God to lead the Magi to the Christ Child. This is illustrated in the Troparion of the Nativity:

Your birth, O Christ our God,
dawned the light of knowledge upon the earth.
For by Your birth those who adored stars
were taught by a star
to worship You, the Sun of Justice,
and to know You, Orient from on High.
O Lord, glory to You.

In Orthodox Christian iconography, the Star of Bethlehem is often depicted not as golden, but as a dark aureola, a semicircle at the top of the icon, indicating the Uncreated Light of Divine grace, with a ray pointing to "the place where the young child lay" (Matthew 2:9). Sometimes the faint image of an angel is drawn inside the aureola.

Simon the Athonite founded the monastery of Simonopetra on Mount Athos after seeing a star he identified with the Star of Bethlehem.

=== Seventh-day Adventist ===
In her 1898 book, The Desire of Ages, Ellen White states "That star was a distant company of shining angels, but of this the wise men were ignorant."

=== The Church of Jesus Christ of Latter-day Saints ===
LDS members believe that the Star of Bethlehem was an actual astronomical event visible the world over. In the 1830 Book of Mormon, which they believe contains writings of ancient prophets, Samuel the Lamanite prophesies that a new star will appear as a sign that Jesus has been born, and Nephi later writes about the fulfillment of this prophecy.

=== Jehovah's Witnesses ===
Members of Jehovah's Witnesses believe that the "star" was a vision or sign created by Satan, rather than a sign from God. This is because it led the pagan astrologers first to Jerusalem where King Herod consequently found out about the birth of the "king of the Jews", with the result that he attempted to have Jesus killed.

== Depiction in art ==
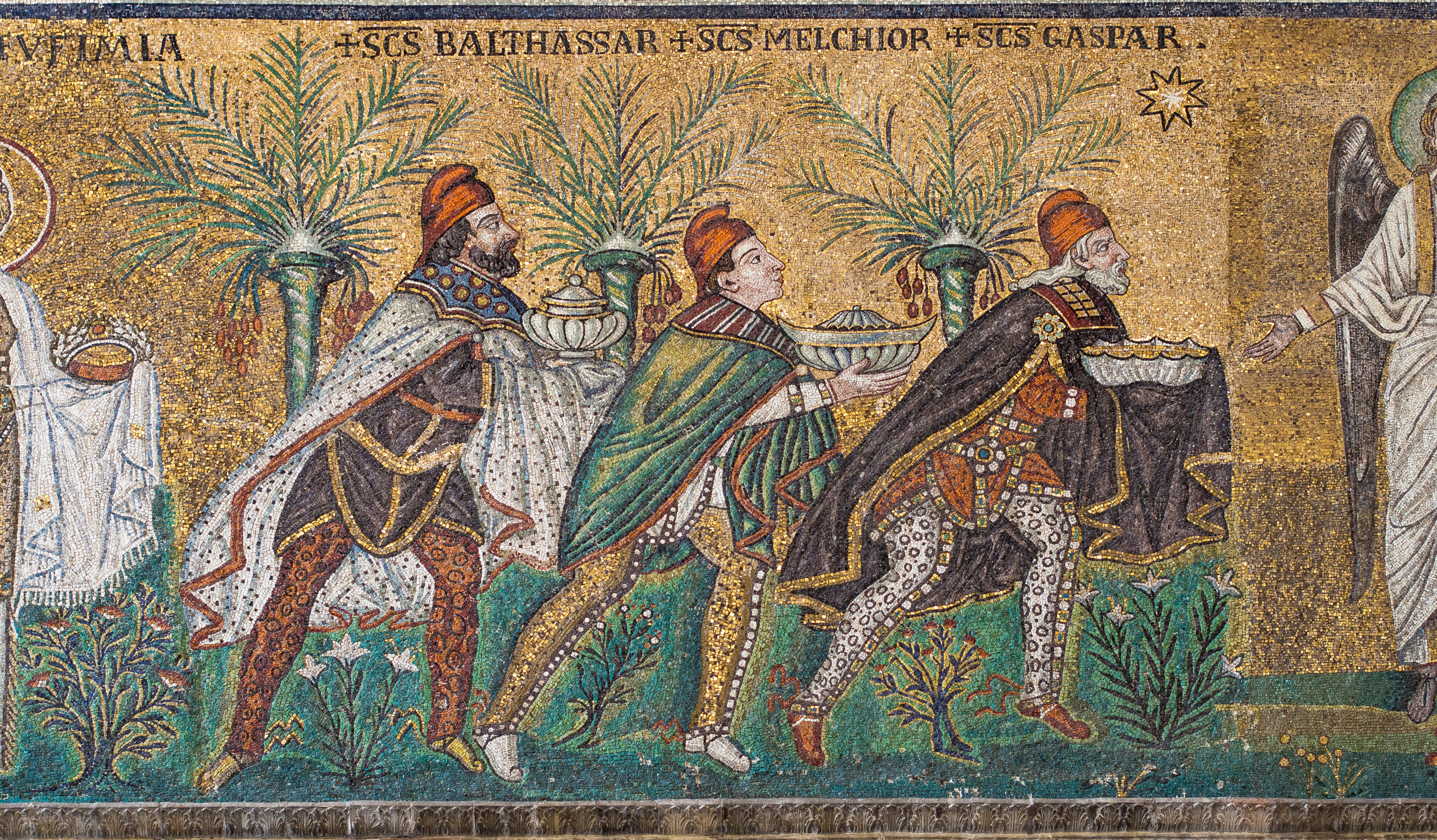
One of the oldest depictions of the star, from the early 6th century CE, as part of a larger mosaic in the Basilica of Sant'Apollinare Nuovo, Ravenna, Italy.

Paintings and other pictures of the Adoration of the Magi may include a depiction of the star in some form. In the fresco by Giotto di Bondone, it is depicted as a comet. In the tapestry of the subject designed by Edward Burne-Jones (and in the related watercolour), the star is held by an angel.

The star lantern known as a paról is a symbol of Christmas for Filipinos, its design and light recalling the star. In its basic form, the paról has five points and two "tails" that evoke rays of light pointing the way to the baby Jesus, and candles inside the lanterns have been superseded by electric illumination.

In the Church of the Nativity in Bethlehem, a silver star with 14 undulating rays marks the location traditionally claimed to be that of Jesus' birth.

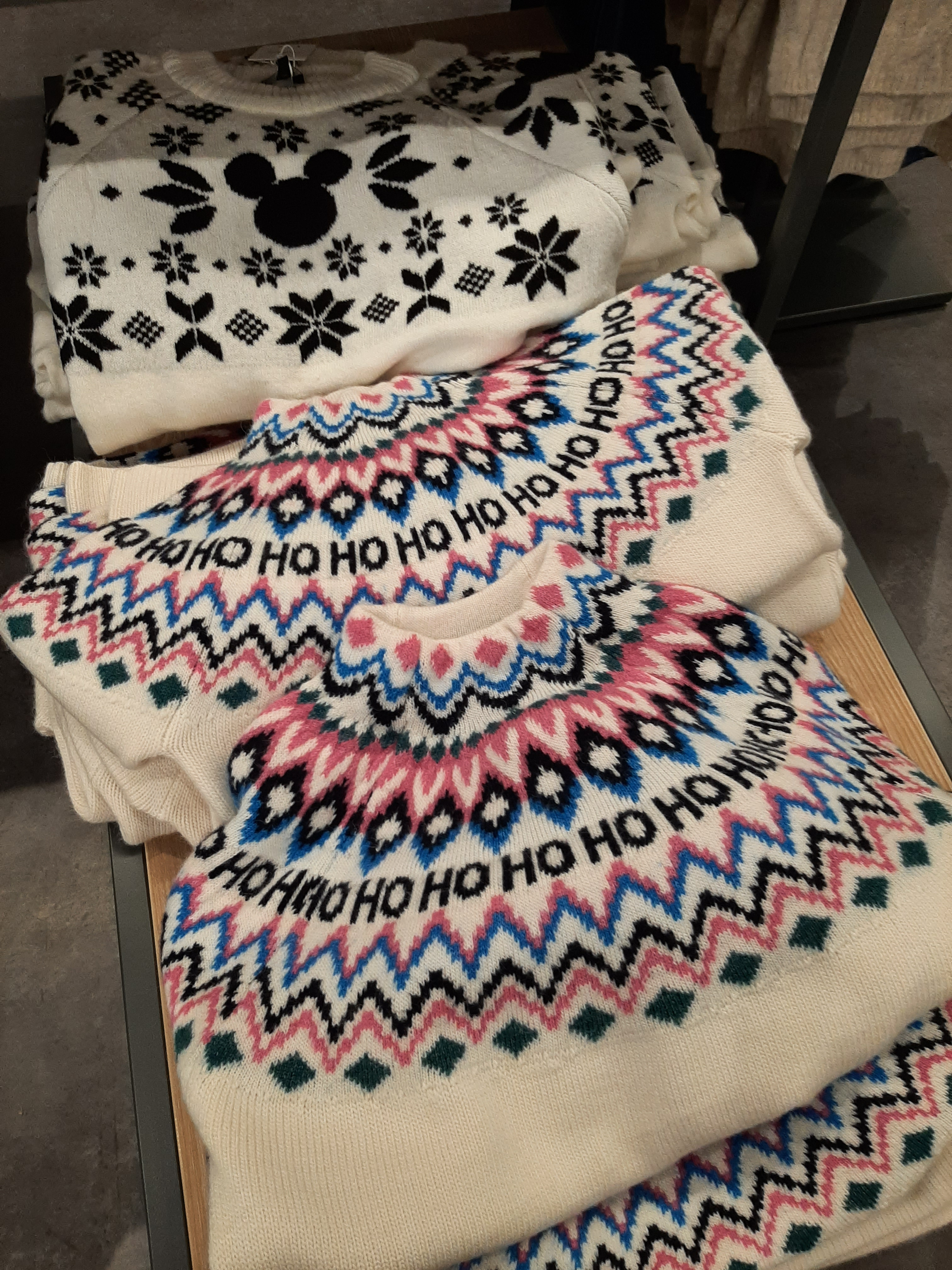

Christmas sweater featuring multiple eight-pointed Star of Bethlehem designs

In textiles, a common eight-pointed star design is known as the Holy Star of Bethlehem. The design has been used in stone, metal, wood-work and embroidery in the Middle East since antiquity and is one of the oldest patterns in Palestinian tatreez embroidery. In 2019, US congresswoman Rashida Tlaib was sworn in wearing a thobe that featured the design. On Vogue Arabia's November 2023 cover, the star took a central position in the celebration of Palestinian embroidery. The design also features on Christmas sweaters.

== See also ==
- Caesar's Comet
- Star of David – the Jewish symbol of King David, which the Star of Bethlehem is often associated with having been a miraculous appearance of.
- RCW 103
- Flag of Nagaland – where the Star of Bethlehem is a symbol of the Christian identity of the Naga people

== Bibliography ==
- Brown, Raymond E. (1973). The Virginal Conception and Bodily Resurrection of Jesus. Paulist Press. ISBN 978-0809117680.
- Brown, Raymond E. (1999). The Birth of the Messiah: A Commentary on the Infancy Narratives in the Gospels of Matthew and Luke. Yale University Press. ISBN 978-0300140088.
- Brown, Raymond E. (1988). An Adult Christ at Christmas: Essays on the Three Biblical Christmas Stories. Liturgical Press. ISBN 0-8028-3931-2.
