= Bernard M. Oliver =

American computer scientist (1916–1995)

- Born: May 17, 1916; Santa Cruz County, California, U.S.
- Died: November 23, 1995 (aged 79); Santa Clara, California, U.S.
- Education: Stanford University (BS, MS); California Institute of Technology (PhD)
- Known for: Pulse-code modulation; HP-35
- Awards: National Medal of Science (1986); National Inventors Hall of Fame (2004)
- Scientific career
- Fields: Computer science
- Workplaces: Hewlett-Packard

Bernard More Oliver (May 17, 1916 – November 23, 1995) also known as Barney Oliver, was an American engineer who made contributions in many fields, including radar, television, and computers. He was the founder and director of Hewlett-Packard (HP) laboratories until his retirement in 1981. He is also a recognized pioneer in the search for extraterrestrial intelligence (SETI). Oliver was president of the Institute of Electrical and Electronics Engineers in 1965.

In 1973, Oliver was elected to the National Academy of Sciences. In 1986, Oliver received the National Medal of Science for Engineering Science. In 2004, Oliver was inducted into the National Inventors Hall of Fame. The asteroid, 2177 Oliver, is named after him. The Monterey Institute for Research in Astronomy's Oliver Observing Station is also named after him.

== Early life and education ==
Bernard (Barney) More Oliver, born to Margaret (née More) and William Oliver, was a native of Santa Cruz, California, grew up on a ranch in the Soquel Valley, and at age 19, received an undergraduate degree from Stanford in 1935. He then obtained a master's degree from the university in 1936 and went to Germany for a year on a scholarship, and returned to complete a Ph.D. magna cum laude by 1939, receiving the degree in 1940 from Caltech.

== Early career ==
Oliver was a member of the technical staff of the Bell Telephone Laboratories from 1940 to 1952.

== HP Labs ==
In 1952, Oliver became Hewlett-Packard's Director of Research, and founded HP Labs. In 1957, Oliver was named Vice President for R&D, and joined HP's Board of Directors, working there until 1981.

In May 1972, the Barney Oliver Amplifier was offered to virtually every product and sales division employee for $325, with 400 orders received by February 1973. The Barney Oliver Amplifier was a cooperative, after-hours "G" job, with Chris Clare, Rich Marconi and Ken Peterson of Paul Stoft's lab assisting on electrical and mechanical aspects, Paul Rasmuasen of Corporate Industrial Design lending his special talents, Clarence Studley of Paul Stoft's lab finalizing the mechanical design, Eileen Martin of HPL doing PC layout, Betty Downs of HPL doing schematics and artwork, and Tom Osborne, helping in a variety of ways. By May 1973, HP produced 400 units, on a time-available basis, for employees only, with earlier models made available in kit form. Bill Hewlett's Barney Oliver Amplifier serial number was 554.

"An old friend of mine who was one of the chief engineers at Hewlett-Packard, Barney Oliver, decided to make a power amplifier. This was maybe 30 years ago, and he got Dave Packard's approval, they would make a hundred, two hundred. It was a terrible amplifier, and Barney, who had the entire backing of Hewlett-Packard, was one of the smartest engineers going. The notion that audio is simple and easy to do is a big fantasy. There are very few people who have ever done it really well." - Richard Sequerra, 26 April 2009 Stereophile

== Works ==
- Oliver, Bernard M. (1997). The Selected Papers of Bernard M. Oliver. Hewlett-Packard Laboratories.
- Oliver, Barney (2001). Modern English Misusage: The Rules of Grammar Explained With Precision & Wit. SETI Press. ISBN 9780966633528.

== Scientific contributions ==
- Developed pulse-code modulation (PCM) with John R. Pierce and Claude Shannon
- Headed the HP-35 (HP calculators) development team

== Chairs, foundations, and awards ==
- In 2004 he was inducted into The National Inventors Hall of Fame.
- In 1997 the SETI Institute established a newly endowed position, the Bernard M. Oliver Chair.
- Bernard Oliver Memorial Fund
- National Medal of Science, List of National Medal of Science winners, Engineering 1986
- Oliver Observing Station, observatory of the Monterey Institute for Research in Astronomy
- IEEE Lamme Medal (1977)

== Personal life ==
In 1945, Oliver married to Priscilla Newton until her death in December 1994. They had three children, Karen, Gretchen and William.

== See also ==
- 2177 Oliver (an asteroid named for Bernard M. Oliver)
- SETI
