= Jamesburg, California =

Unincorporated community in California, United States

Jamesburg
- Unincorporated community
- Location in California Jamesburg (the United States)
- Coordinates: 36°22′11″N 121°35′25″W
- Country: United States
- State: California
- County: Monterey
- Elevation: 1,722 ft (525 m)

Jamesburg (formerly Jamesburgh) is an unincorporated community in Monterey County, California, United States. It is located 7.5 miles (12 km) northeast of Ventana Cone, at an elevation of 1722 feet (525 m).

John James founded the town in 1867. The Jamesburgh post office opened in 1886, changed its name to Jamesburg in 1894, and closed for good in 1935.

In 1968, COMSAT built the Jamesburg Earth Station - no longer operational - in the area. Local legend has it that Jamesburg Earth Station relayed Neil Armstrong's famous Apollo 11 statement from the Moon in July 1969: "it’s one small step for man, one giant leap for mankind."

== Government ==
At the county level, Jamesburg is represented on the Monterey County Board of Supervisors by Supervisor Kate Daniels.

In the California State Legislature, Jamesburg is in the 17th senatorial district, represented by Democrat John Laird, and in the 30th Assembly district, represented by Democrat Dawn Addis.

In the United States House of Representatives, Jamesburg is in California's 20th congressional district, represented by Republican Vince Fong.
