= Monterey Institute for Research in Astronomy =

Astronomical observatory located in California founded in 1972

Monterey Institute for Research In Astronomy
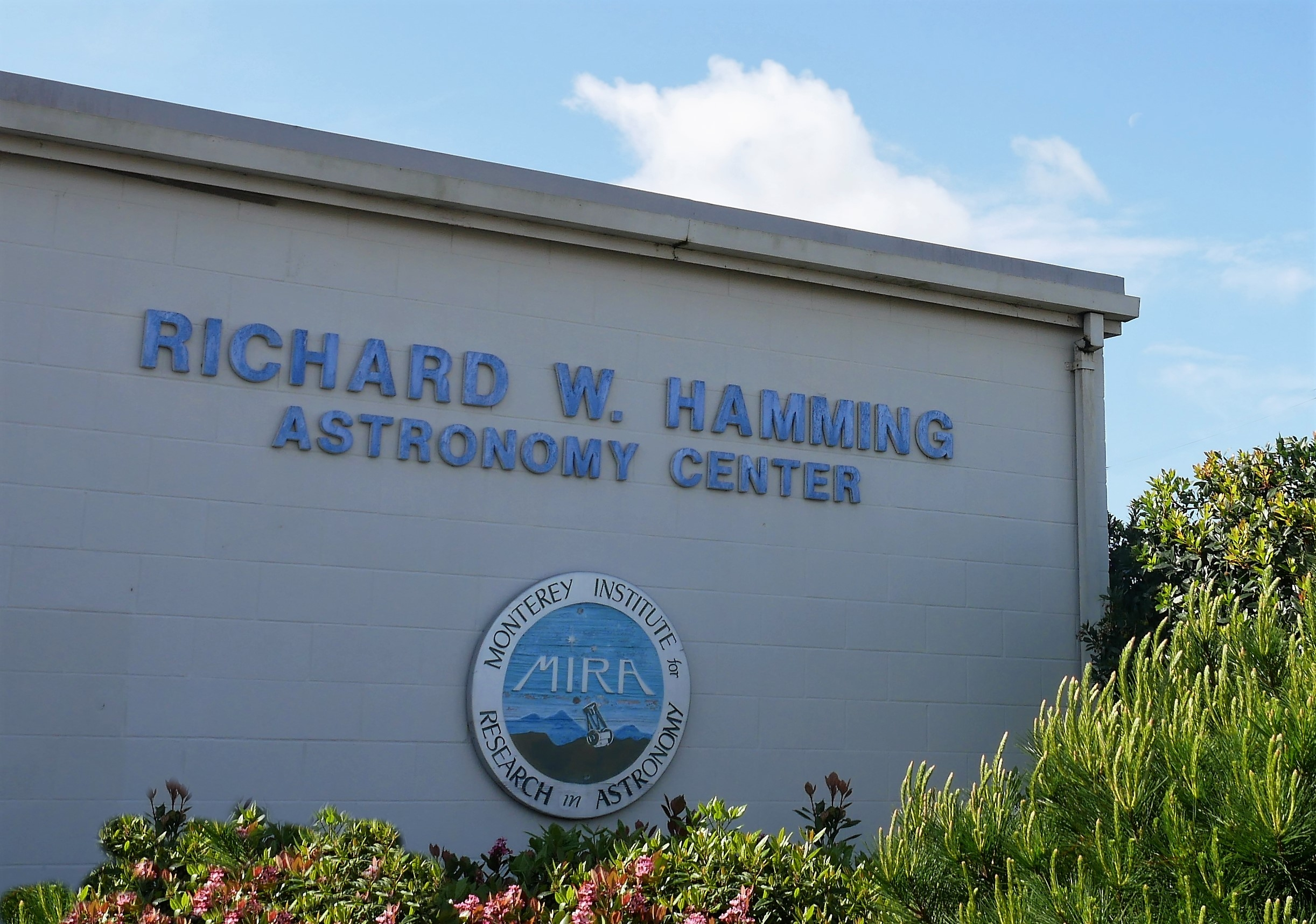
- Organization: Monterey Institute for Research In Astronomy
- Location: Marina, California and Chews Ridge in the Los Padres National Forest
- Coordinates: 36°39′40″N 121°48′31″W
- Established: 1972
- Website: mira.org

Telescopes
- 36 inch Cassegrain telescope
- Related media on Commons

The Monterey Institute for Research in Astronomy (MIRA) is an independent, non-profit, professional astronomical observatory dedicated to astronomical education and research, near Monterey, California. It was the first private professional observatory in the United States to open in the 20th century.

== History ==
MIRA was founded in 1972. The acronym "MIRA" was chosen because of the unusual star of that name and the reference to the astronomically-relevant Spanish word for ‘look’.

The idea for an independent observatory came from Wm. Bruce Weaver and Craig Chester, then astronomy graduate students at Warner and Swasey Observatory, Case Western Reserve University in Cleveland, Ohio; the other founders were Donna Burych, Cynthia Irvine, Nelson Irvine, Albert Merville, Anne Merville, Hazel Ross, and Sandra Weaver. The group of "nearly penniless and doomed graduate students" were concerned about how they would manage to work in astronomy. According to MIRA astronomer Arthur Babcock, during the early 1970s, as "the glory days of space exploration were winding down", the scientists wanted a place where they could do long range research without the "demanding cycle of academia" and constant publishing. As observational stellar astronomers, they needed constant access to a large telescope. Working at the Kitt Peak Observatory in Arizona was a possibility but opening their own observatory was even better; it started off as a joke but over time and in discussion with the other close-knit students it received serious contemplation. A meeting at a lecture with astronomer Bart Bok, who was very enthusiastic about the idea, encouraged the students.

With Bok's influence and word-of-mouth, the Case students began to discuss the idea at other campuses. During one lecture at the University of Maryland they "heard of a 36-inch mirror that was gathering dust at Princeton. It had been built by NASA as the backup for Stratoscope II ... and never used". Carl Sagan suggested that the Case students be invited to give a talk at the American Astronomical Society, where Weaver found Martin Schwarzschild who was then director of the Princeton Observatory, "eating breakfast alone and sat down with him"; this was an event known as '"the famous breakfast meeting"'. That discussion led to Princeton "indefinitely" loaning the mirror to the Case students.

Because the Case students had now gained access to the mirror and had received pledges from the other students, and because they were not tied to any specific institution, they only needed to find a location. They knew that mountain ranges "along the west coast of a continent", where the air was smooth from the ocean, "resulted in small sharp star images". This knowledge led the students to eventually select the Santa Lucia Range. Lick Observatory astronomers had been interested in a new observing station in that area. Students Albert and Ann Merville were sent to investigate locations, and they selected Chews Ridge which had an elevation of 5,082 feet (1,549 m). A dirt road and a fire tower nearby were other considerations in favor of the location. In 1972, the astronomers applied to the Forest Service for a use permit, and it was granted in 1974. Over the next couple of years, the Case students completed their doctorates, moved to Monterey County, and took part-time jobs in the area, in order to make a down payment on 80 acres (32 ha) in Cachagua Valley, near the Carmel foothills.

Bruce Weaver recounts that the formation of the Friends of MIRA happened in September 1978 "when 80 people assembled in Ansel Adams' house."

The influence of Bok and the nearness of Lick Observatory allowed MIRA to "receive a $76,000 grant from the Research Corporation ... to build a telescope around the 36-inch mirror". In 1975, as a training exercise, the Army Engineers finished the last half mile of the road to the observatory.

When the observatory opened its doors officially in 1982, it was the first private professional observatory to open in the United States in the 20th century. In 1983 the cost of the observatory was $950,000, it was estimated that if purchased commercially it would have been double that cost.

== Research ==
The 5-year mission of MIRA in its beginning was to do a "spectral and photometric study of the brightest 125,000 stars in the northern sky", which was meant to "yield the data base for a generation of astronomers". The group decided that they would focus on the "'nonglamour area in astronomy'" — stars in our own galaxy. Studying how stars form and die as well as categorizing stars, "statistical studies and composition and properties of T Tauri stars ... and N-type Carbon stars. MIRA astronomer Nelson Irvine states "that is not the most glamorous area '... that means there's more chance to do important work'".

Using a tool attached to their research telescope, MIRA has discovered in 2022 that the star Beta Crucis is fourteen times larger than the Sun and about eleven million years old.

== Facilities ==
MIRA's facilities are divided between its in-town offices and shops. They are located near the southern border of the city of Marina, and the northern edge of CSU Monterey Bay. Its research observatory is in the remote Los Padres National Forest, roughly half-way between the unincorporated settlement of Jamesburg and the Tassajara Zen monastery. Weaver Student Observatory is at 36°39′40″N 121°48′29″W. MIRA's campus is contiguous with the campus of the California State University, Monterey Bay, but MIRA is independent from any parent institution, and not affiliated with the university. The Marina campus consists of the following:

- The Richard Hamming Astronomy Center, which contains the offices and the Priscilla Bok library
- The Ralph Knox Shops, which contains the mechanical, electrical, and optical shops
- The Elma Ross Library
- The Bette M. and William R. Weaver Student Observatory (WSO), which houses a computer-controlled 14 inch Schmidt-Cassegrain telescope for public and student use

Bok and his wife — astronomer Priscilla Fairfield Bok — donated "their entire collection of journals and books". The library later received a "van full of professional journals" from astronomer Art Hoag.

== Observatory ==
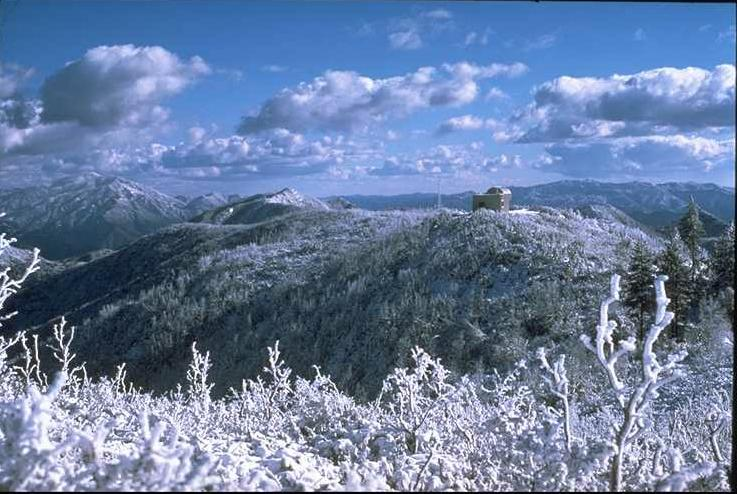
The MIRA Bernard M. Oliver Observing Station in winter

The MIRA research observatory is the Bernard M. Oliver Observing Station, and is located on Chews Ridge in the Los Padres National Forest at 36°18′20″N 121°34′00″W. Scientist Bernard Oliver gave the '"gift of a lifetime"' which was a quarter of the costs for construction of the Chews Ridge observatory. Chews Ridge was chosen for its cool weather and "steady airflow off the cold Pacific Ocean" giving astronomers "clear nights and sharp images". Also, the mountains block light pollution from the city of Greenfield allowing for "pitch-black conditions". The observatory has a full-time live in caretaker year-round.

The building was designed by amateur astronomer, architect Lawrence Bernstein. Described as looking more like a "ski chalet than an observatory" the building was designed to allow for the best viewing conditions. There is a roll-off roof, to avoid turbulence, and the building is set on a hollow pier to avoid air currents that might affect the telescope. A separate control room for the operator is located north of the telescope. The Chews Ridge area is littered with gun shells, so the designers felt it was important that the building be bullet-proof, and have angled windows to prevent a direct view of the inside. In preparation for fire, the walls are filled with gravel; if the outer wall burns, then gravel will be released to smother the flames.

The observatory houses a computer-controlled 36 inch Cassegrain telescope equipped with Spectrographs, one of two copies of the world's most precise astronomical polarimeter, HIPPI-2, and direct cameras. The observatory is mostly self-sufficient with generators, batteries and solar panels. "A 16,000-gallon-tank collects rainwater, doing double duty by also helping to stabilize the telescope." Power comes from a windmill on the ridge. The Oliver station is one of the few that does not use a dome with a slit to look through; the whole roof slides back to expose the room. This avoids the problem of turbulence that the wind can cause when using a retracted dome.

MIRA astronomers see themselves as pioneers. We identify with the small, relatively backward observatories. We would like to share with these folks who don't have a lot of resources. We would like to be copied.

— Craig Chester

== Timeline ==
- 1971, March - Students Bruce Weaver and Craig Chester at Case Western Reserve University contemplate opening their own observatory.
- 1972, March - Incorporated as Monterey Institute for Research in Astronomy (MIRA)
- 1972, Spring - Albert and Ann Merville sent to California to look for a site for the observatory.
- 1973 MIRA members viewed Comet Kohoutek from Carmel.
- 1974 MIRA receives $75,000 grant from the Research Corporation to build telescope around 36-inch mirror.
- 1974 Forest service grants use permit for observatory.
- 1975, August 30 - MIRA members with portable telescopes first viewing from Chews Ridge site - Nova Cygni seen.
- 1978, September 15 - Fundraising organization, Friends of MIRA formed at Ansel Adams home.
- 1978, Fall - Spectrograph installed on telescope.
- 1982 MIRA "discovered an area in the Southern Hemisphere where new stars were forming."
- 1992 10th anniversary - public tours of station and new "visitor center".
- 1994 A Catalog of Co-Added IRAS Fluxes of Orion Population Stars published by Bruce Weaver and Gordon Jones AAS CD-ROM series, Volume II
- 2006 MIRA expands center to include classrooms, library and meeting room. Becoming a three-story building "with a direct microwave link" to the telescope at Chews Ridge
- 2016 the caretaker at the Oliver Observing Station had over 1,000 firefighters camping at the observatory during the Soberanes Fire.

== Operation ==
MIRA offers community lectures, classes and events. They have a telescope lending program, and offer hands-on internships for local schools, as well as for the Naval Postgraduate School.

== Photo gallery ==
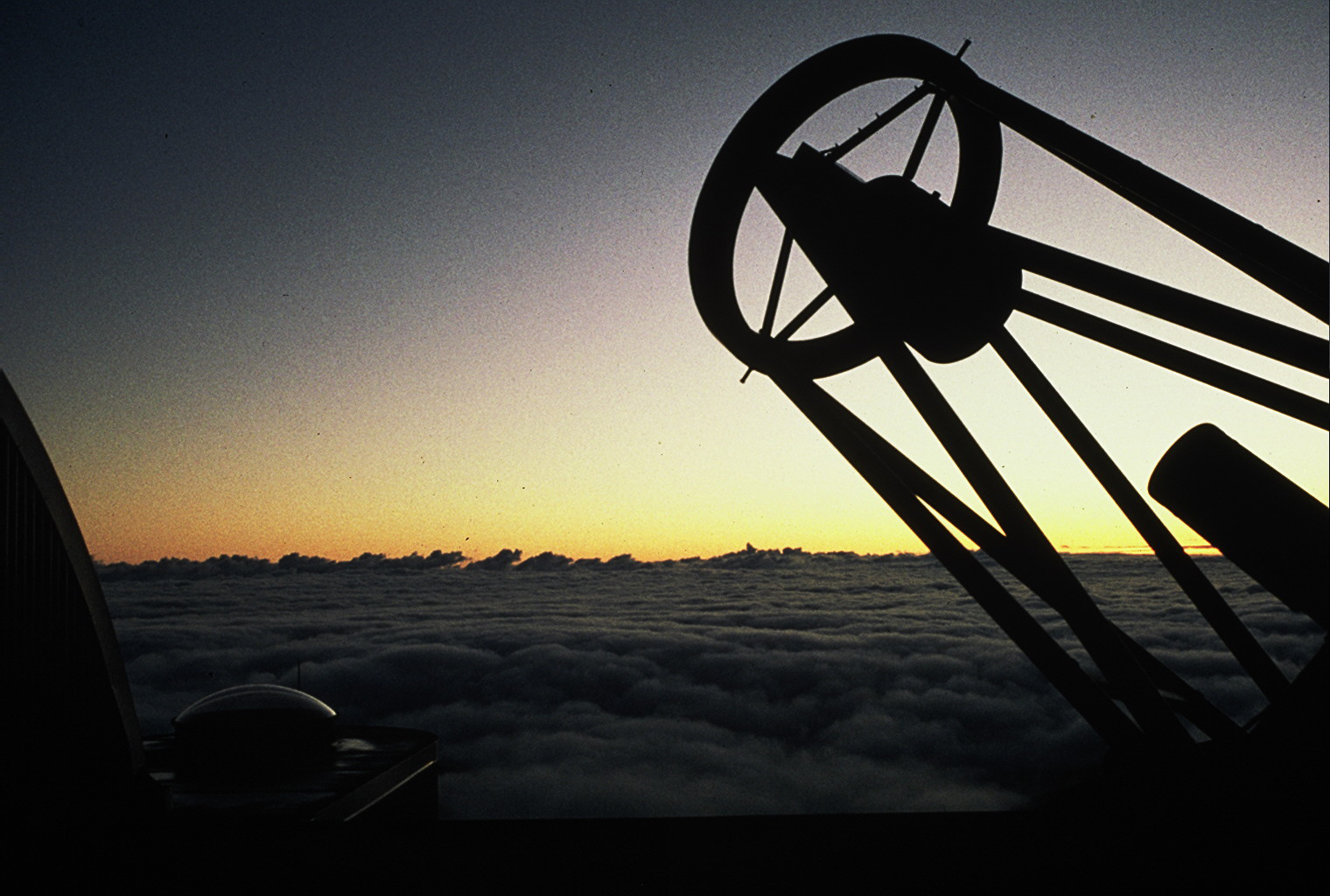
OOS at Sunrise

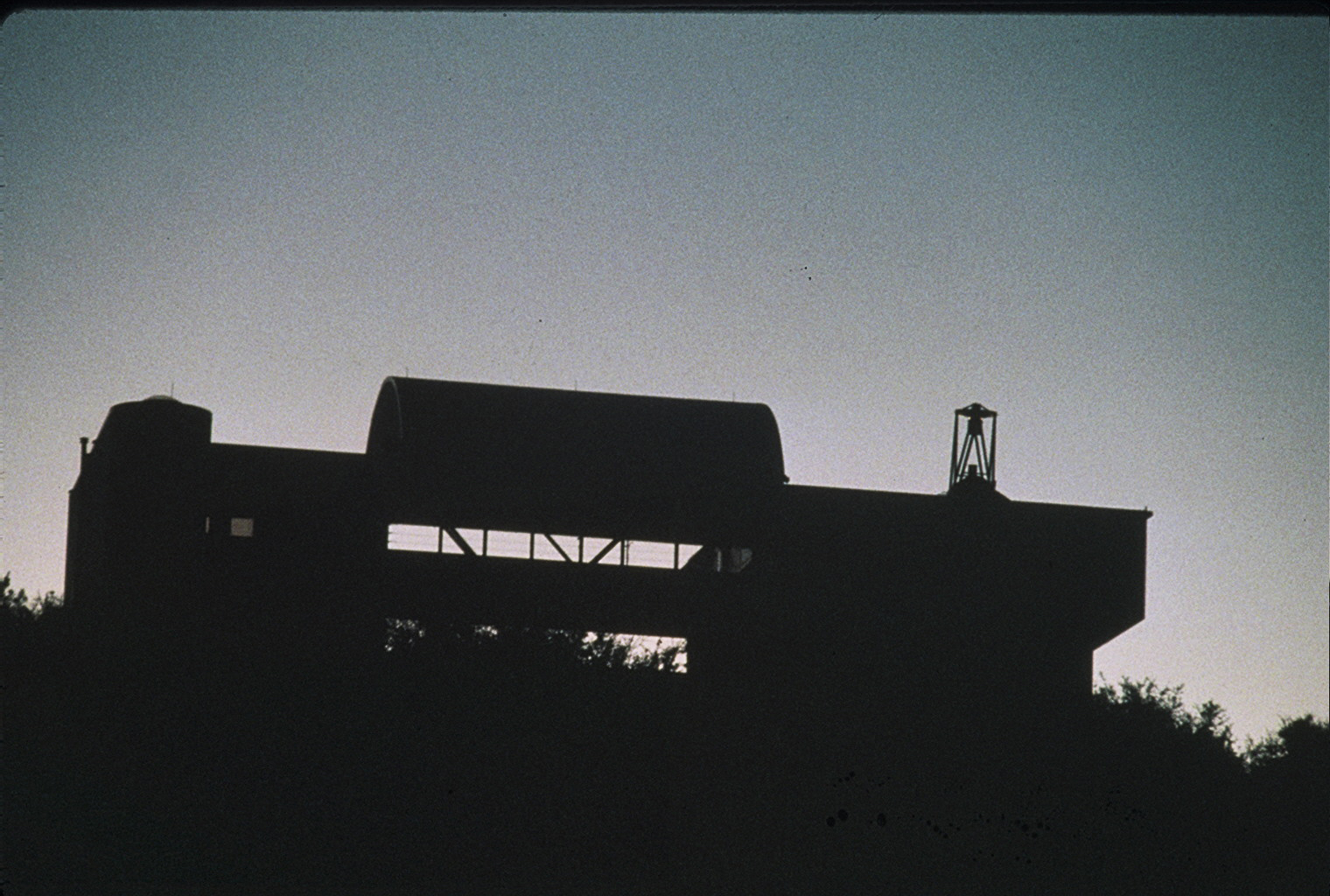
MIRA's Oliver Observing Station with the roof rolled off

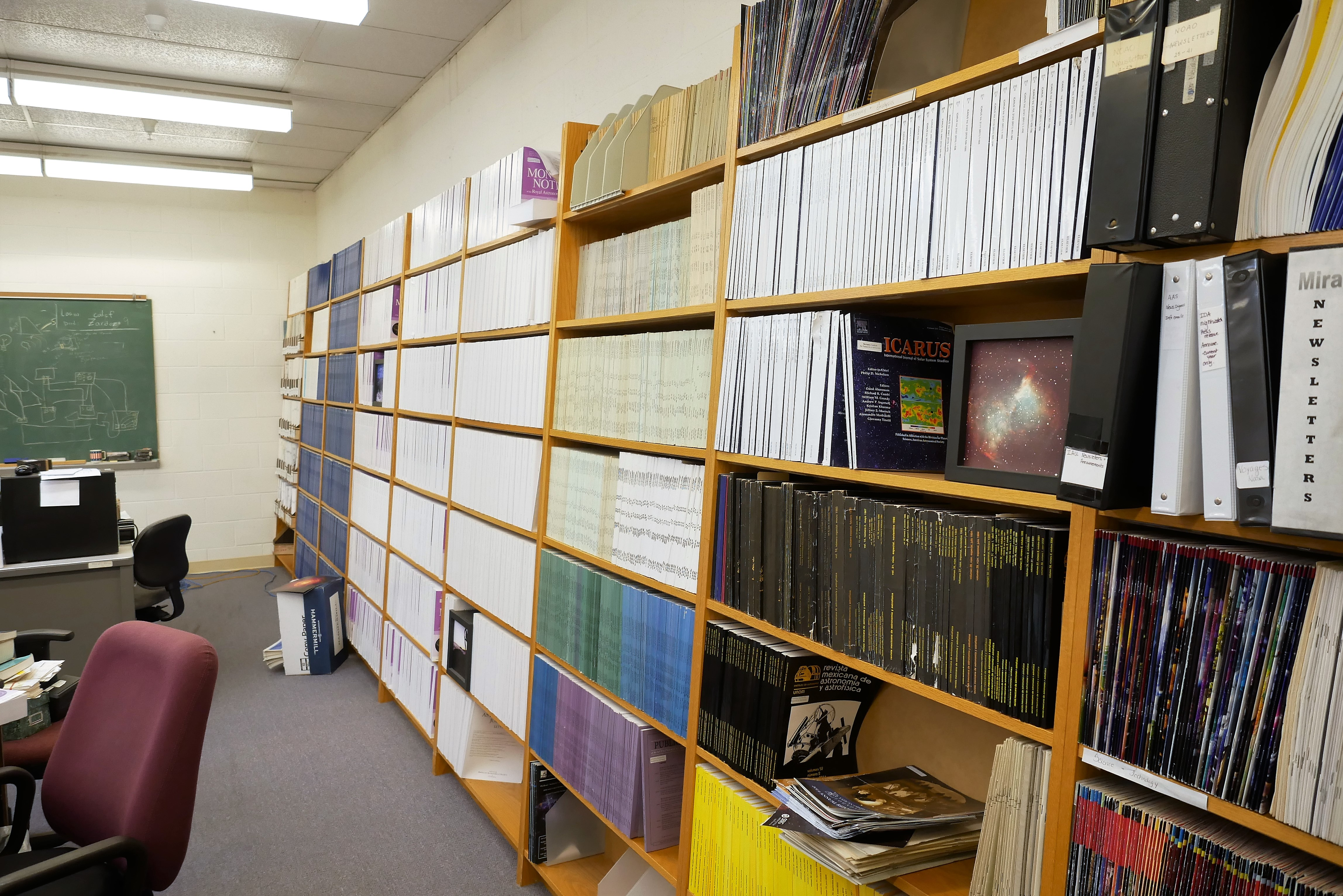
The Priscilla Bok library

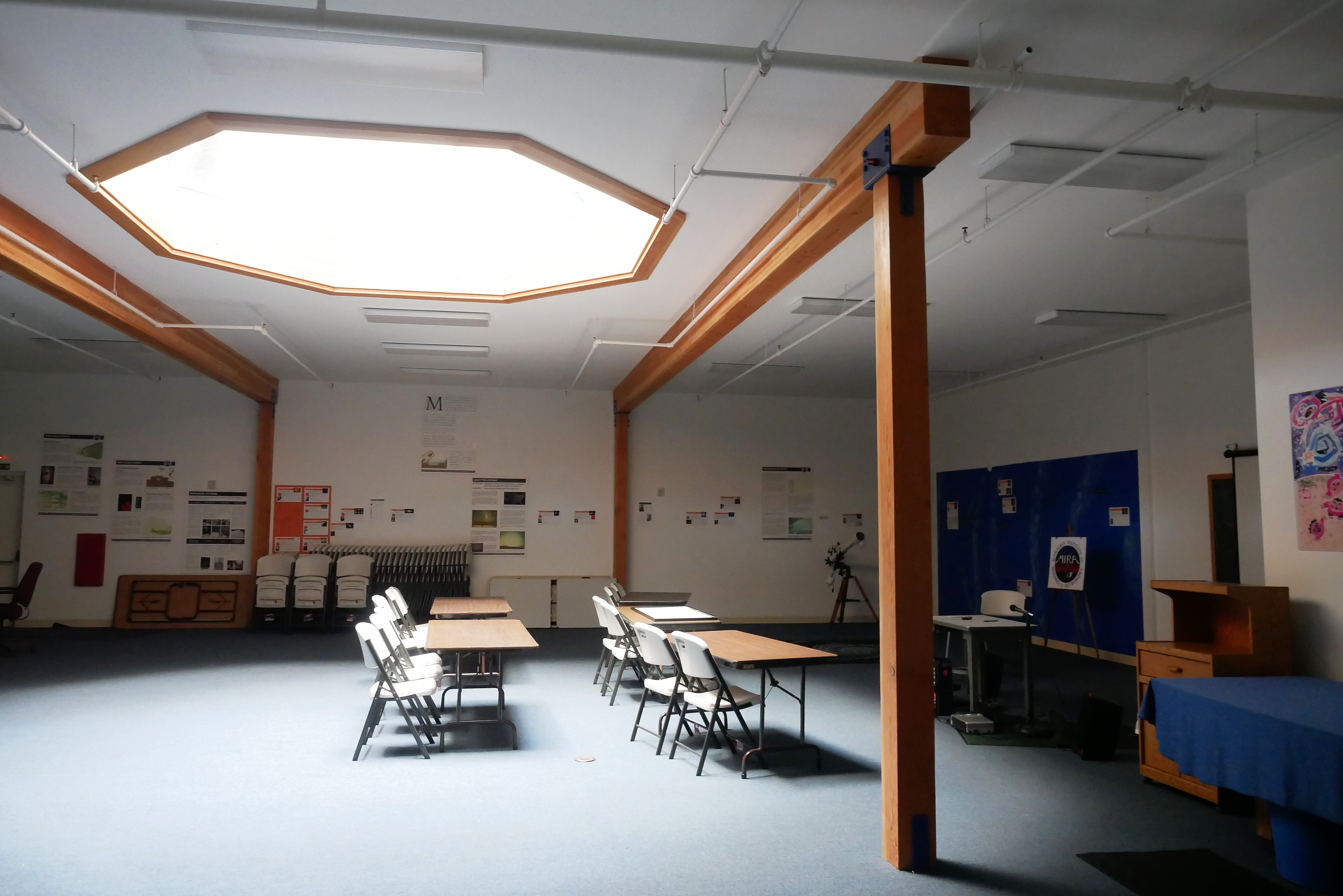
Meeting room

== See also ==
- List of observatories
