= McCuskey =

McCuskey is a surname. Notable people with the surname include:

- Chandler McCuskey Brooks (1905–1989), American physiologist
- Elbert S. McCuskey (1915–1997), American flying ace
- JB McCuskey (born 1981), West Virginia politician
- John F. McCuskey (born 1947), West Virginia politician and justice of the Supreme Court of Appeals of West Virginia.
- Michael P. McCuskey (born 1948), American judge
- Sidney Wilcox McCuskey (1907–1979), American mathematician and astronomer

== See also ==
- 2007 McCuskey, a main-belt asteroid
