= Brooks Observatory =

Observatory in Ohio, US

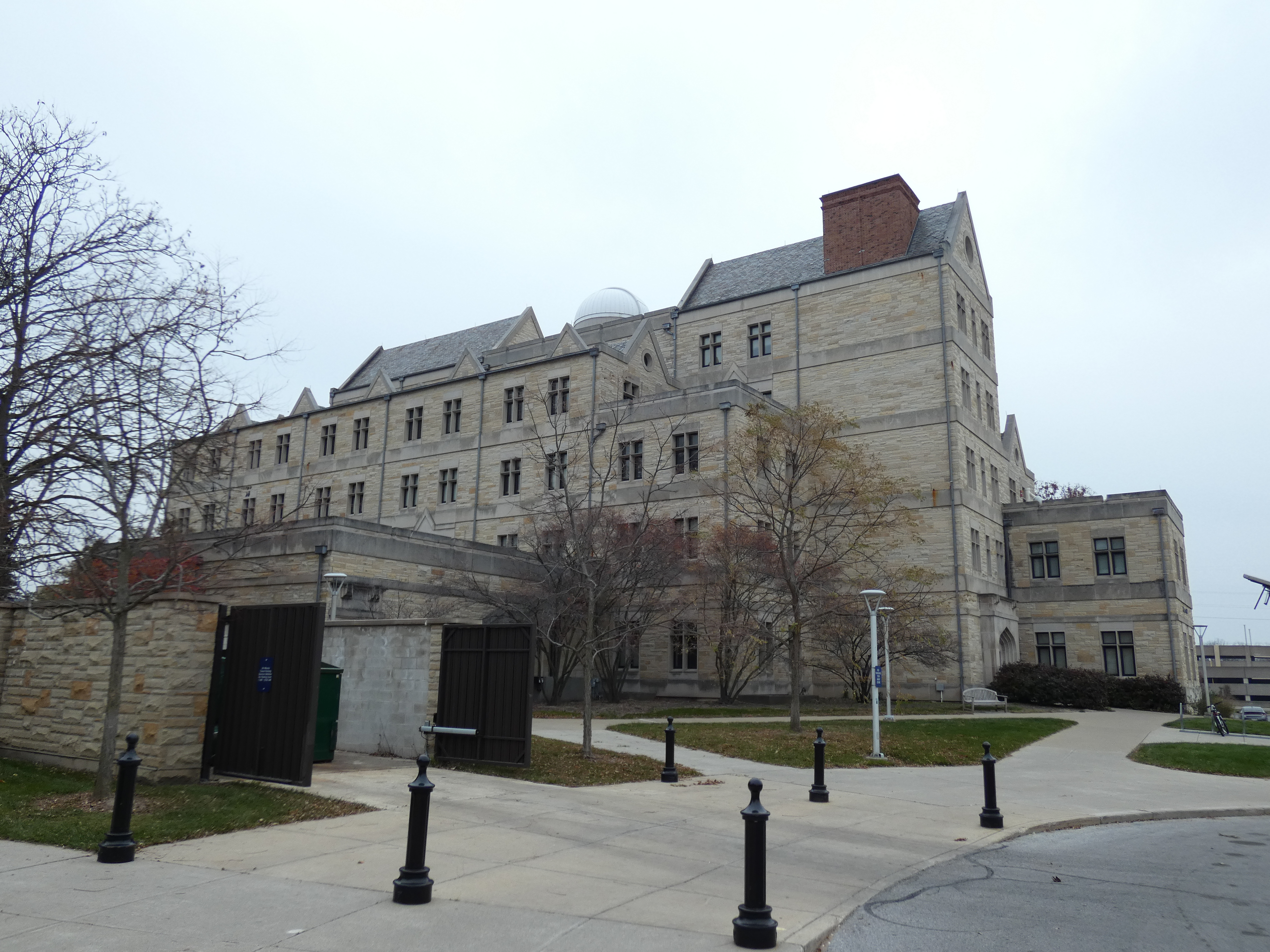
- Organization: University of Toledo
- Location: Ohio, United States
- Coordinates: 41°39′45″N 83°36′41.6″W
- Website: www.rpbo.utoledo.edu

Telescopes
- Unnamed: 6 inch Refractor

Brooks Observatory is an astronomical observatory owned and operated by the University of Toledo. The observatory is used primarily for public viewing and undergraduate instruction. It hosts an array of small telescopes, the centrepiece of which is a Celestron 14 Edge HD. It is located on the campus of the University of Toledo in Toledo, Ohio (USA), occupying the 6th floor of McMaster Hall, home to the Department of Physics and Astronomy.

Adjacent to Brooks Observatory is Ritter Observatory, which houses Ritter Planetarium and a one-metre telescope. In contrast to the telescopes at Brooks Observatory, the Ritter telescope is used for graduate and faculty research.

== See also ==
- Brooks Astronomical Observatory
- List of observatories
