= 992 Swasey =

Main-belt asteroid

Discovery
- Discovered by: O. Struve
- Discovery site: Williams Bay
- Discovery date: 14 November 1922

Designations
- Alternative designations: 1922 ND

Orbital characteristics
- Epoch 31 July 2016 (JD 2457600.5)
- Uncertainty parameter 0
- Observation arc: 93.41 yr (34118 days)
- Aphelion: 3.2866 AU (491.67 Gm)
- Perihelion: 2.7715 AU (414.61 Gm)
- Semi-major axis: 3.0291 AU (453.15 Gm)
- Eccentricity: 0.085029
- Orbital period (sidereal): 5.27 yr (1925.6 d)
- Mean anomaly: 133.184°
- Mean motion: 0° 11^{m} 13.056^{s} / day
- Inclination: 10.843°
- Longitude of ascending node: 212.248°
- Argument of perihelion: 345.294°

Physical characteristics
- Mean radius: 13.665±0.7 km
- Synodic rotation period: 13.308 h (0.5545 d)
- Geometric albedo: 0.1132±0.013
- Absolute magnitude (H): 10.5

992 Swasey is an asteroid, a minor planet orbiting the Sun. It was discovered by Otto Struve in 1922 at the Yerkes Observatory in Williams Bay, Wisconsin, United States. It is named after Ambrose Swasey of the Warner & Swasey Company, which built the 82-inch telescope named after Struve at McDonald Observatory.
