= Warner & Swasey Company =

American manufacturer

- Founded: 1880; 146 years ago
- Founders: Worcester Reed Warner; Ambrose Swasey
- Defunct: 1980
- Fate: Acquired by Bendix Corporation
- Headquarters: Cleveland, Ohio, United States

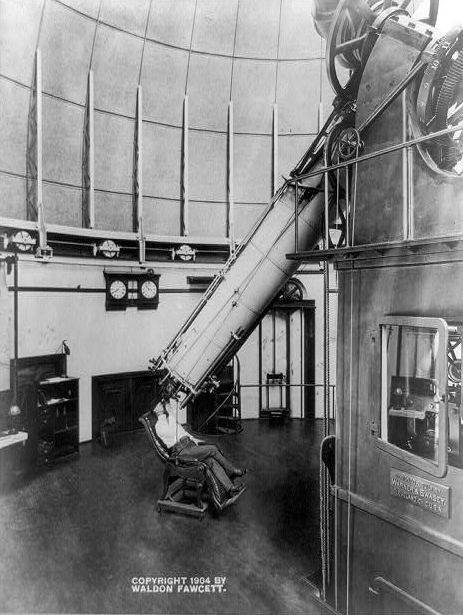
26-inch Warner & Swasey refractor, U.S. Naval Observatory, 1904. Warner & Swasey name is visible on plate attached to telescope mount at lower right.

The Warner & Swasey Company was an American manufacturer of machine tools, instruments, and special machinery. It operated as an independent business firm, based in Cleveland, from its founding in 1880 until its acquisition in 1980. It was founded as a partnership in 1880 by Worcester Reed Warner (1846–1929) and Ambrose Swasey (1846–1937). The company was best known for two general types of products: astronomical telescopes and turret lathes. It also did a large amount of instrument work, such as equipment for astronomical observatories and military instruments (rangefinders, optical gunsights, etc.) The themes that united these various lines of business were the crafts of toolmaking and instrument-making, which have often overlapped technologically. In the decades after World War II, it also entered the heavy equipment industry with its acquisition of the Gradall brand.

While it was astronomical telescopes that made the company famous, its profits came from machine tools, especially turret lathes, and military instruments; telescope-making "essentially amounted to astronomical philanthropy," rooted in the founders' life-long interest in astronomy.

== History ==
In 1866, Swasey and Warner met as fellow apprentices at the Exeter Machine Works in Exeter, New Hampshire. Within a few years they went together to Pratt & Whitney in Hartford, Connecticut, which was one of the leading machine tool builders of the era. There they both rose through the ranks, with Warner rising to be in charge of an assembly floor and Swasey rising to be foreman of the gear-cutting department. There Swasey invented the epicycloidal milling machine for cutting true theoretical curves for the milling cutters used for cutting gears.

In 1880, Swasey and Warner resigned from Pratt & Whitney in order to start a machine-tool-building business together. They investigated Chicago as a place to build their works, but they perceived the Chicago of 1880 as too far west and lacking a sufficient labor pool of skilled machinists. So they went to Cleveland, Ohio, where their company would stay for the next century. They worked together for 20 years without a formal corporate agreement, during which time their partnership's principal products were various models of lathes and milling machines. From the beginning, the partners built both machine tools and telescopes, which reflected their interests in toolmaking, instrument-making, and astronomy.

After nearly 20 years of successful growth, the partners realized that their business was growing enough that it should be given a formal corporate structure, so in 1900 they reorganized it under the official name of The Warner & Swasey Company.

During the early- to mid-20th century, the company was well known in American industry. Its products, both turret lathes and instruments, played very prominent roles in the war efforts for both world wars. Warner & Swasey took part in the transition to numerical control and computer numerical control machine tools during the 1950s through 1970s, but like many other machine tool builders during those decades, it ultimately was affected by the prevailing winds of merger and acquisition in the industry. Bendix Corporation acquired Warner & Swasey in 1980 for nearly $300 million, beating out a competing bid by AMCA International. Warner & Swasey's last plant, in Solon, Ohio, closed in January 1992.

In 2019, the Warner & Swasey Company Building was listed on the National Register of Historic Places.

In 2022, the Trademark for Warner & Swasey was acquired by the company Geissele Automatics, and subsequently used to promote their upcoming red dot optic.

== Products ==
=== Telescopes ===
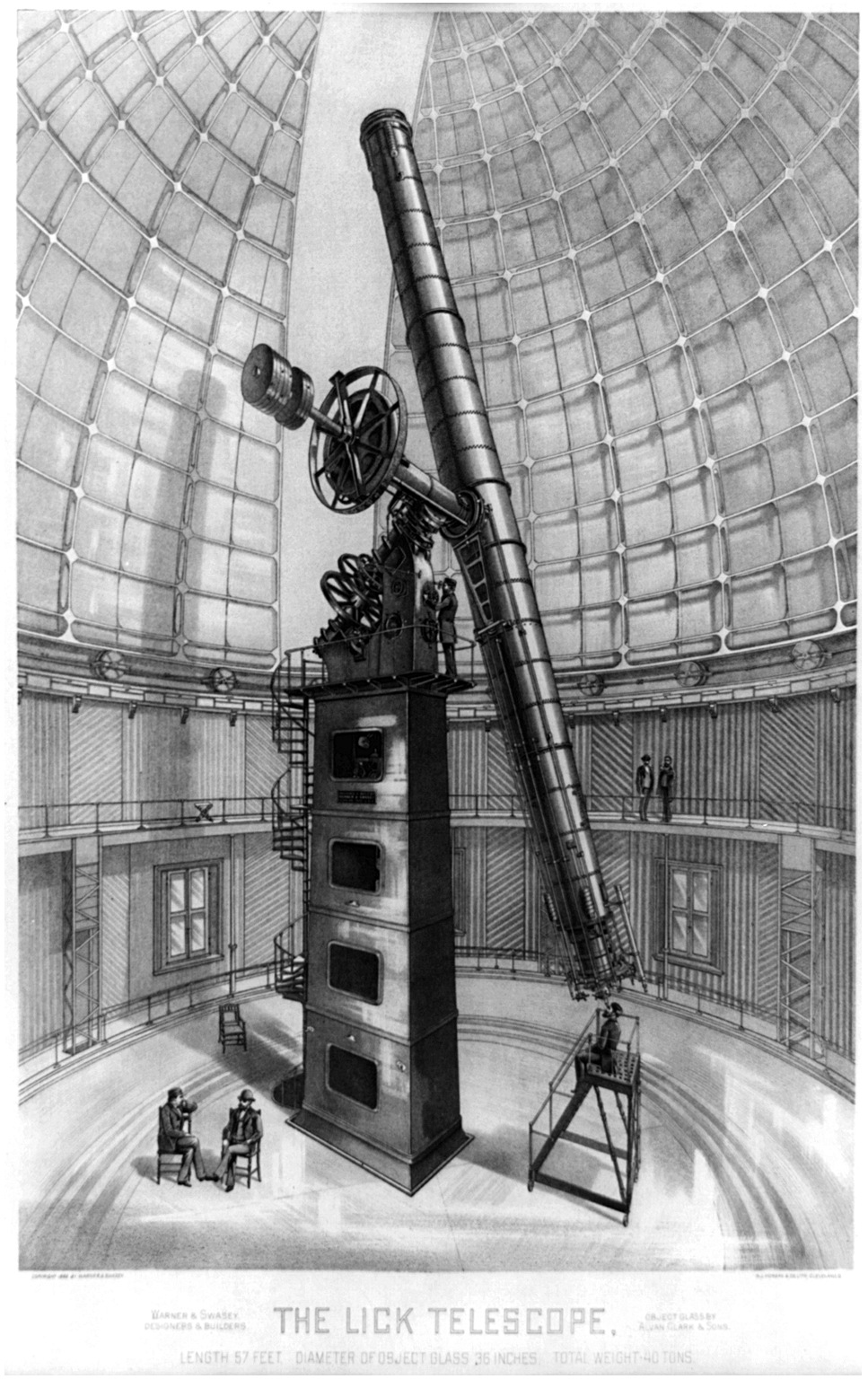
Warner & Swasey designed and built the Lick Observatory refractor, shown here in an 1889 drawing. Alvan Clark & Sons made the 36-inch objective lens.

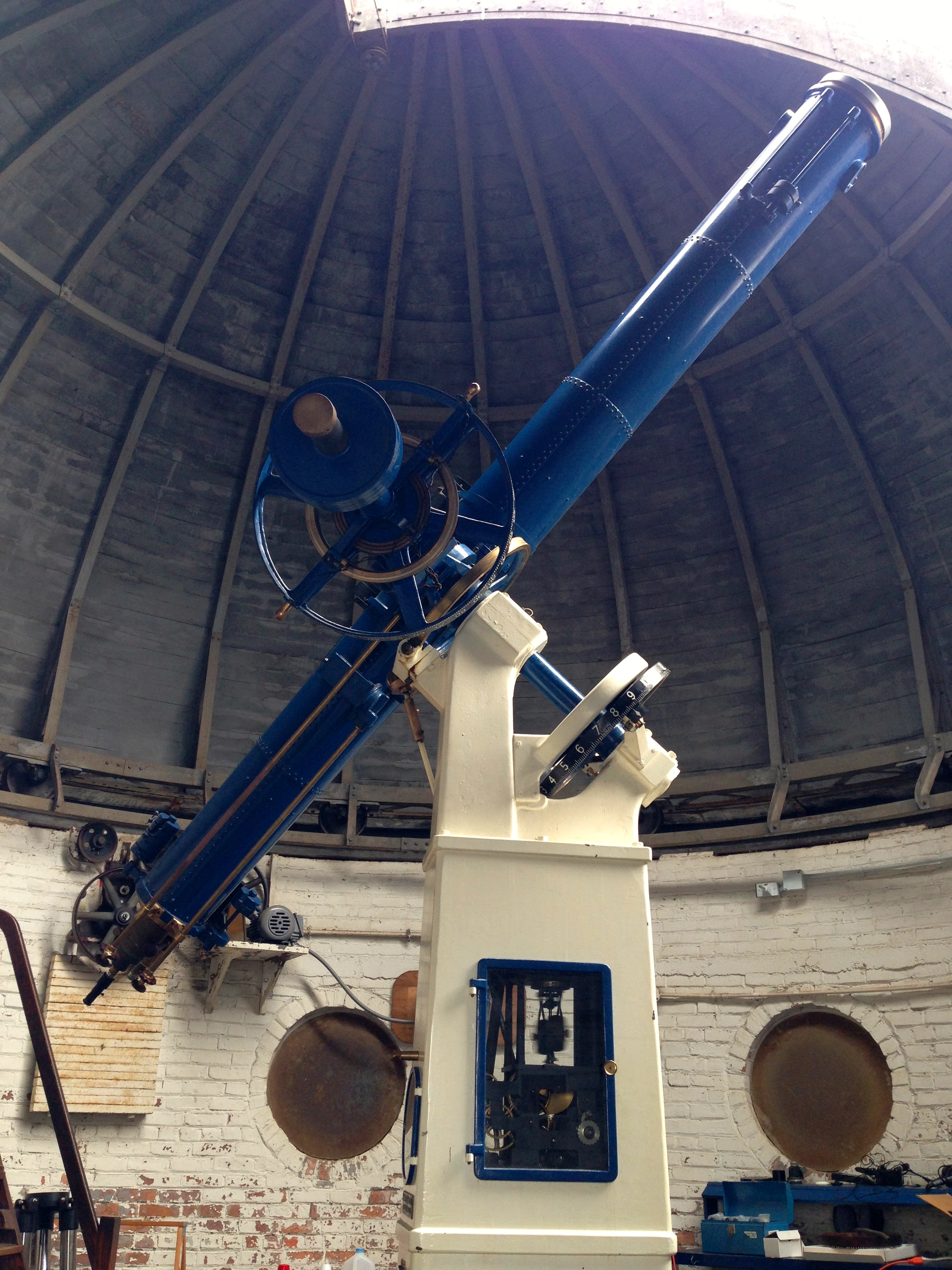
The Irving Porter Church Memorial Telescope (built in 1922) on its original Warner & Swasey mount. The 12" objective lens was polished by Brashear Co.

The first Warner & Swasey telescope, built in 1881, was sold to Beloit College for its new Smith Observatory and had a 9.5-inch lens made by Alvan Clark & Sons. Among the notable instruments the company built were the telescopes for Lick Observatory (1888, 36-inch, refracting); the United States Naval Observatory (1893); Yerkes Observatory (according to the 50th-anniversary book, this was a 40-inch refracting telescope completed in time for display at the World's Columbian Exposition of 1893, although its installation at Yerkes was apparently in 1897); and Canada's Dominion Astrophysical Observatory (1916, 72-inch, reflecting). In 1919, the company's founders donated their private observatory (built between their neighboring houses on Euclid Avenue) in East Cleveland, Ohio to Case Western Reserve University. Today's Warner and Swasey Observatory grew from that facility.

The company's 50th-anniversary book describes the firm's giant-telescope-building work as unprofitable overall but a labor of technological love.

==== List of observatories with Warner & Swasey telescopes ====
- Bosque Alegre Observatory, National University of Cordoba, ARG
- Burrell Memorial Observatory, Baldwin Wallace University, USA
- Crane Observatory, Washburn University, USA
- Chabot Space & Science Center, Oakland, California, USA
- Drake Municipal Observatory, Des Moines, Iowa, USA
- Dominion Astrophysical Observatory, NRC, Canada
- Dudley Observatory, miSci, Schenectady, NY, USA
- Durfee High School, Fall River, Massachusetts, USA
- Fuertes Observatory (Irving Porter Church Memorial Telescope), Cornell University, USA
- Hildene Astronomy Club (Robert Todd Lincoln Telescope), Manchester, Vermont, USA
- James Observatory, Millsaps College, Jackson, Mississippi, USA
- Kirkwood Observatory, Indiana University, USA
- Lee Observatory, American University of Beirut, Lebanon
- Lick Observatory, University of California, USA
- McDonald Observatory (Otto Struve Telescope), University of Texas at Austin, USA
- Moraine Farm Observatory (Col. Deeds 7" Refractor), Col. Deeds Homestead, currently owned by Kettering health Network, Dayton OH, USA
- Painter Hall Observatory, University of Texas at Austin, USA
- Perkins Telescope, Lowell Observatory, USA
- McKim Observatory, DePauw University, USA
- Mueller Observatory, Cleveland Museum of Natural History, USA
- Ritter Observatory, University of Toledo, USA
- Spacewatch 0.9-meter Telescope, Kitt Peak, University of Arizona, USA
- Stephens Memorial Observatory (Cooley Telescope - 9-inch Refractor), Hiram College, USA
- Swasey Observatory, Denison University, USA
- Tate Laboratory, School of Physics and Astronomy, University of Minnesota, USA
- United States Naval Observatory (USNO), United States Navy, USA
- University of Illinois Observatory, Urbana, Illinois, USA
- Theodor Jacobsen Observatory, University of Washington, USA
- Warner and Swasey Observatory, Case Western Reserve University, USA
- Yerkes Observatory, Williams Bay, Wisconsin, USA

=== Turret lathes ===
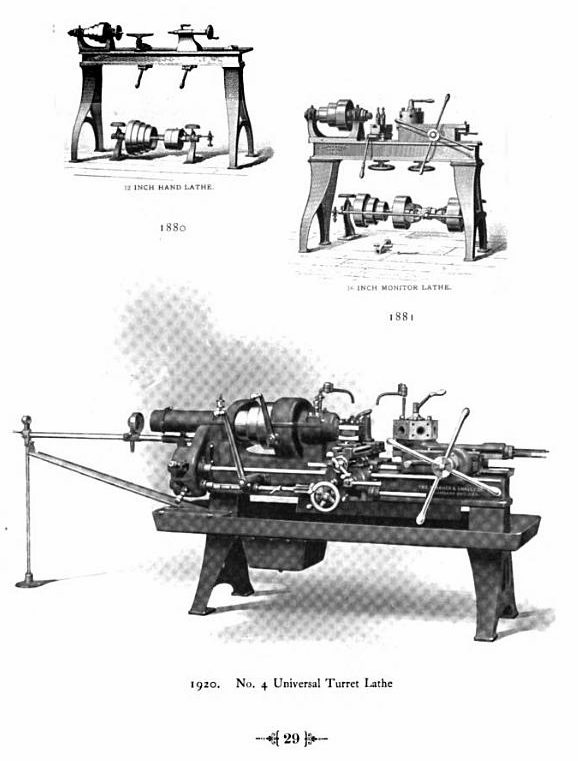
A selection of turret lathe models between 1880 and 1920.

Warner & Swasey was one of the premier brands in heavy turret lathes between the 1910s and 1960s; it became the world's largest manufacturer of such lathes by 1928. During World War II, it employed 7,000 people and produced half of the turret lathes manufactured in the United States. Its chief competitors in this market segment included Jones & Lamson (Springfield, VT, USA), Gisholt (Madison, WI, USA), and Alfred Herbert Ltd (Coventry, UK).

=== Military instruments ===
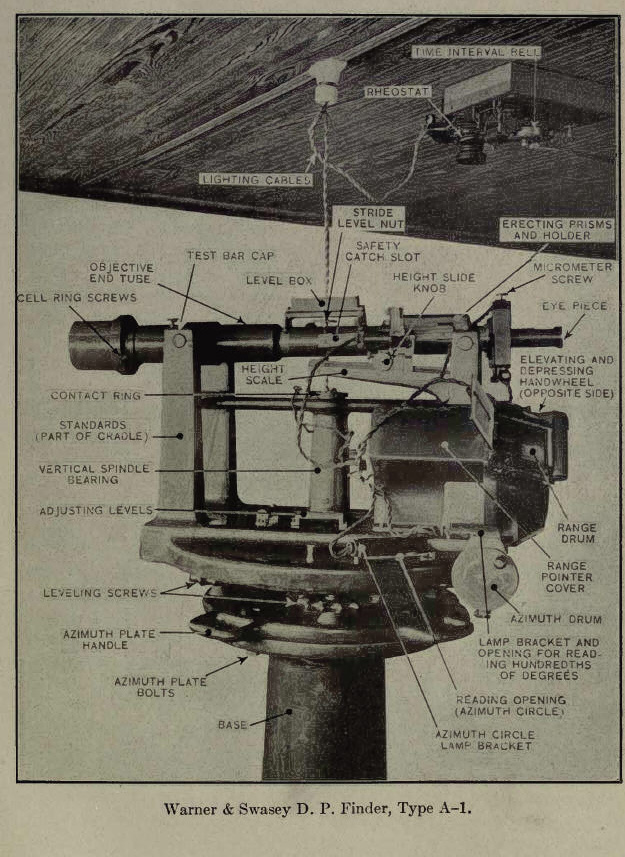
An American Warner-Swasey depression position finder, illustration from a 1910 manual

Military instrument contracts were an important line of work for the company. The U.S. government referred many problems concerning such instruments to the company during the Spanish–American War (1898). Instruments produced included "range finders of several types, gun-sight telescopes, battery commanders' telescopes, telescopic musket sights, and prism binoculars". Presumably, the range finders included the company's depression position finder. During World War I, three important kinds of instrument were produced: "musket sights, naval gun sights, and panoramic sights".

=== Construction equipment ===
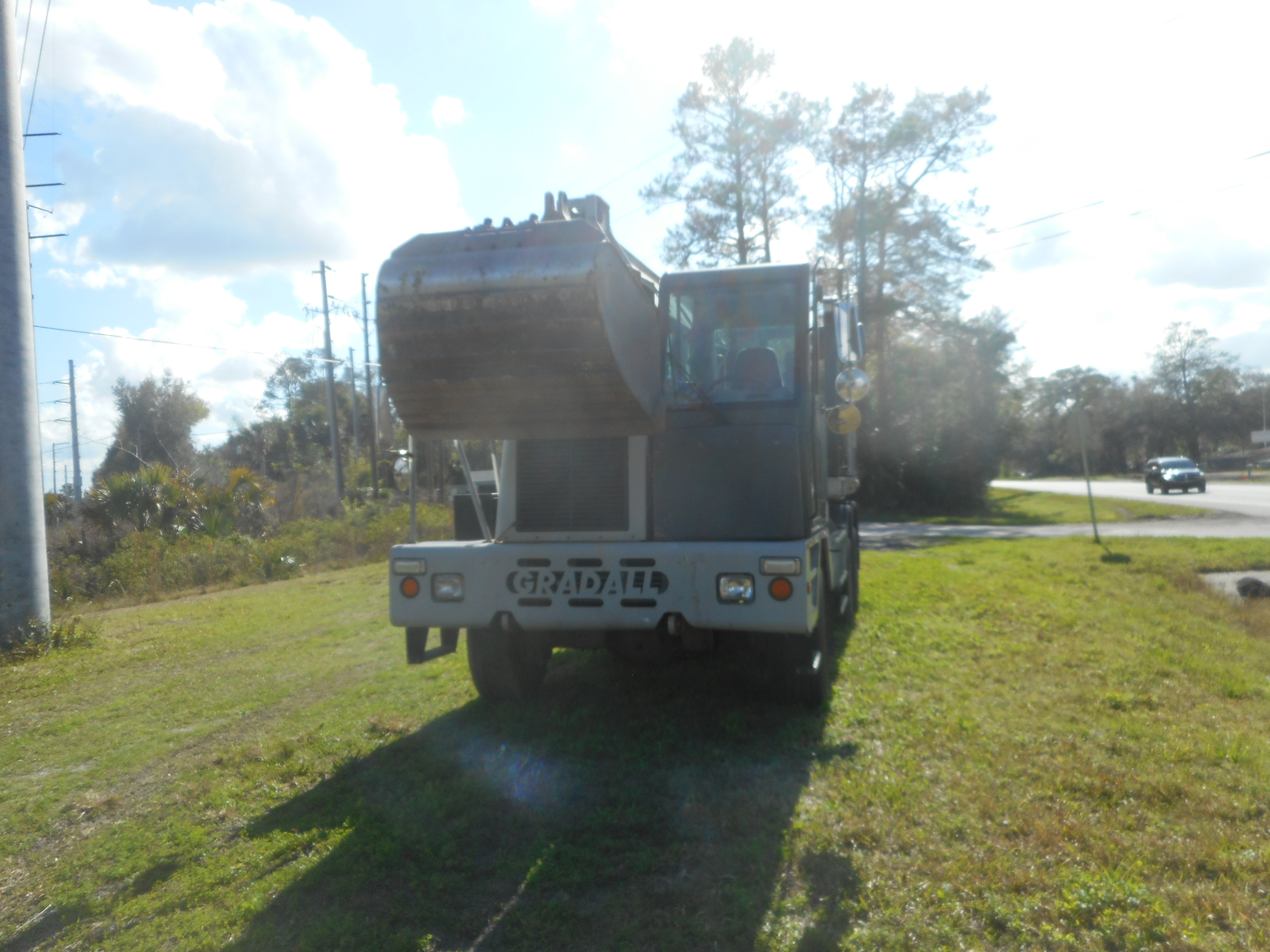
A Gradall XL5100-III excavator, formerly a product of Warner & Swasey.

The foundation of the Warner & Swasey Construction Equipment Division with five product lines was started in 1946 with the development of the first production hydraulic excavator; the GRADALL®. This machine was new technology for the industry and was highly versatile and productive for a variety of work. The DUPLEX TRUCK® Company of Lansing, Michigan, a heavy duty and specialized truck manufacturer was acquired in 1955 to supply truck chassis for the GRADALL and future Warner & Swasey backhoe excavator and crane products.

In 1957 the Company sought a broader market penetration into the hydraulic excavator market. It acquired the Badger Machine Company of Winona, Minnesota, with its six HOPTO® hydraulic excavator models which complimented the Gradall models. Badger had been formed in 1946 and developed a tractor-mounted hydraulic backhoe dubbed the "HOPTO" (Hydraulically Operated Power Take-Off) as it was driven by the tractor's power take-off.

In 1967, the Company acquired the Sargent Engineering Corporation of Fort Dodge, Iowa, a manufacturer of hydraulic cranes. Their six Sargent Hydra-Tower Crane models enabled the company to move into another large segment of the construction industry using hydraulic machinery. That same year the Company partnered with a Canadian paper industry association in the manufacture of the Arbomatik, a line of hydraulic tree harvesting equipment. Through corporate diversity into hydraulic construction equipment, the growing popularity and productivity of this type of hydraulic machinery yielded strong business growth for the Warner & Swasey company of Cleveland, Ohio during the years of 1946 through 1977. Badger Machine was sold to Alvis International Group in 1978.

==== Gradall ====
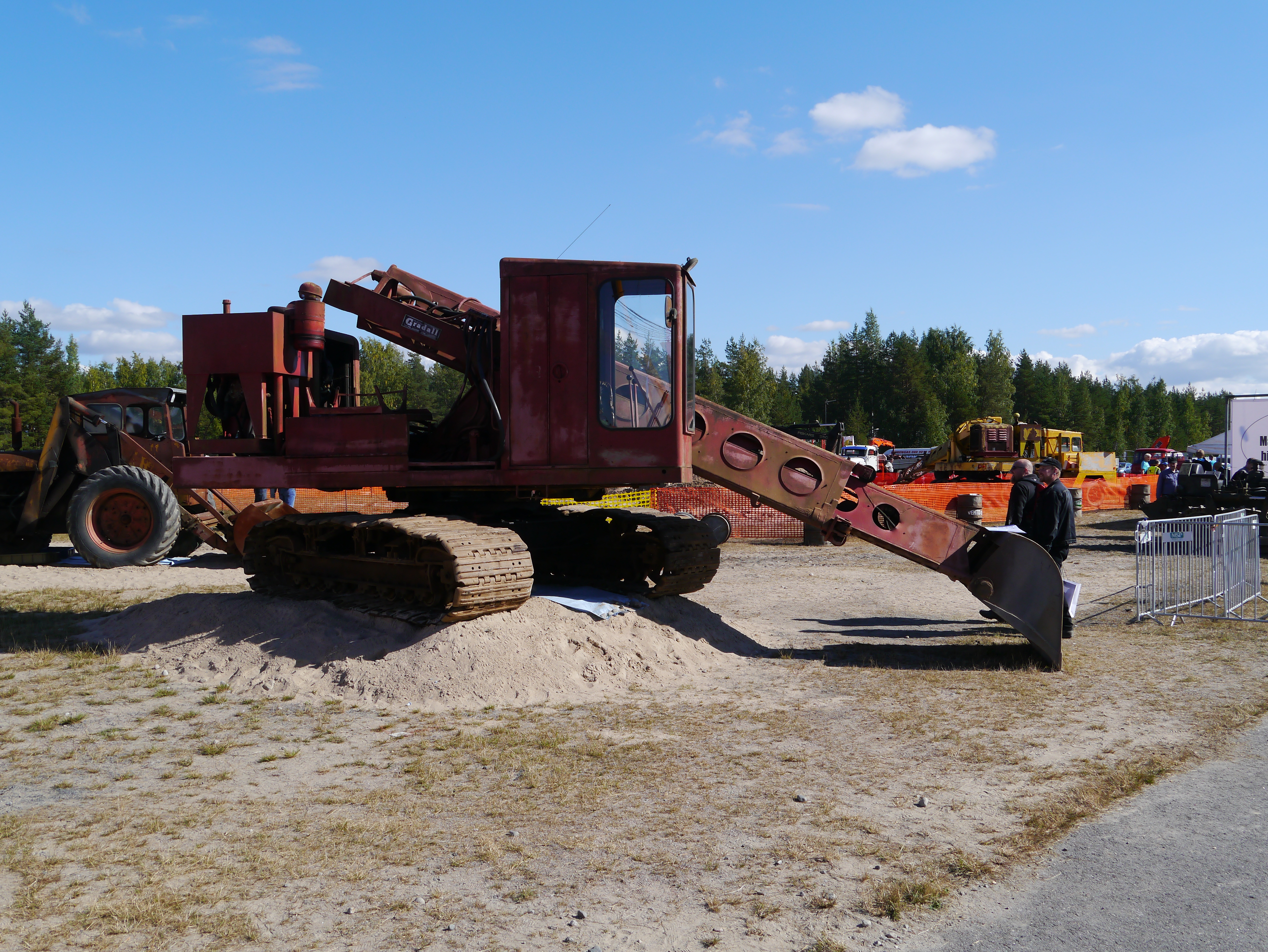
1960 Gradall 2460 Excavator, manufactured by Warner & Swasey

In 1946, Warner & Swasey Company acquired the patent rights to manufacture the Gradall telescopic boom excavator from the brothers Ray and Koop Ferwerda with their manufacturing company, the FWF Corporation, of Beachwood, Ohio. The Gradall, a type of hydraulic machinery, became a business of the new owner as the Gradall Division with operations in Cleveland. In the year 1946, the Gradall was the first production hydraulic excavator that was designed and manufactured in the United States. In July 1950, Gradall manufacturing operations were moved to New Philadelphia, Ohio, where it continues in 2017, as Gradall Industries, Inc., a global manufacturer of telescopic boom excavators and industrial maintenance machinery. Following the purchase of Warner & Swasey by Bendix in 1980 and the purchase of Bendix by Allied Corp in 1983, ownership of Gradall shifted multiple times in the 1980s. Following the acquisition by Allied, Gradall was sold to a group of local executives who formed a partnership called GBKS. In 1985, ICM Industries, a Chicago consulting firm, purchased Gradall. In 1995 Morgan, Lewis, Githens & Ahn, a New York City investment firm acquired the company and directed an IPO, but retained a controlling interest. From 1999 to 2006, Gradall was owned by JLG. In 2006 Gradall was acquired by the Alamo Group of Seguin, Texas and formally was renamed Gradall Industries.

== See also ==
James Hartness, president of competitor Jones & Lamson Machine Company, a contemporary of Worcester Reed Warner and Ambrose Swasey who shared their avocations of developing better telescopes and better turret lathes.

== Bibliography ==
- Grant, James H. (2016), Warner & Swasey Construction Equipment, New Philadelphia, Ohio, USA: JHG Partners, LLC, ISBN 978-0-9853877-2-3, archived from the original on 2018-04-21.
- Grant, James H. (2012), Load Handler Gradall LOED Materials Handler, New Philadelphia, Ohio, USA: JHG Partners, LLC, ISBN 978-0-9853877-1-6.
- Grant, James H. (2010), The Gradall: A Story of American Ingenuity, New Philadelphia, Ohio, USA: JHG Partners, LLC, ISBN 978-0-692-00667-2, archived from the original on 2018-04-21.
- Warner & Swasey Company (1920), The Warner & Swasey Company, 1880-1920, Cleveland, Ohio, USA: Warner & Swasey Company.
- Warner & Swasey Company (1930), The Warner & Swasey Company, 1880-1930, Cleveland, Ohio, USA: Warner & Swasey Company.
