= Ambrose Swasey =

American engineer (1846–1937)

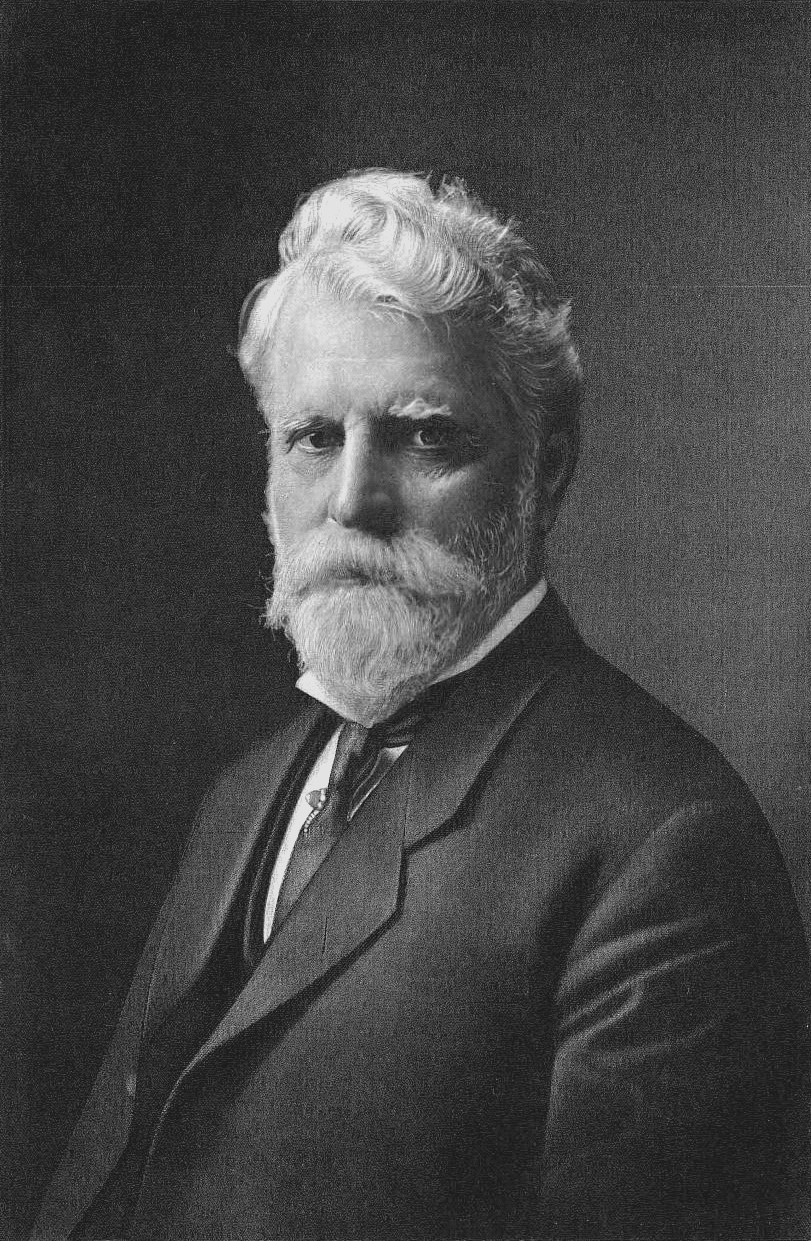
- Ambrose Swasey
- Born: December 19, 1846; Exeter, New Hampshire, US
- Died: June 15, 1937 (aged 90); Exeter, New Hampshire, US
- Occupations: Engineer, inventor, machinist, entrepreneur, executive, philanthropist
- Known for: Co-founder of the Warner & Swasey Company
- Spouse: Lavinia Marston Cummings

Ambrose Swasey (December 19, 1846 – June 15, 1937) was an American mechanical engineer, inventor, entrepreneur, manager, astronomer, and philanthropist. With Worcester Reed Warner he co-founded the Warner & Swasey Company.

== Life and work ==
Swasey was born near Exeter, New Hampshire to Nathaniel and Abigail Swasey. He apprenticed as a machinist at the Exeter Machine Works and was afterwards employed at Pratt & Whitney. As his career progressed, he became a foreman in the gear-cutting section. He developed a new technique for making gear-tooth cutters. In 1880, he and Warner formed their eponymous firm, which quickly moved to Cleveland, Ohio. Swasey would perform the engineering and machine development at this company.

The close friends Warner and Swasey built their homes next to each other on Euclid Avenue in Cleveland, a street that was known as "Millionaire's Row".

In addition to army ordnance contracts, the firm of Warner & Swasey became notable for their work on astronomical observatories and equipment. The founders were interested in astronomy as an avocation, and in the field's quest for better optical telescopes, which was burgeoning at the time. They also realized that obtaining contracts to build large astronomical observatories would provide publicity for their company.

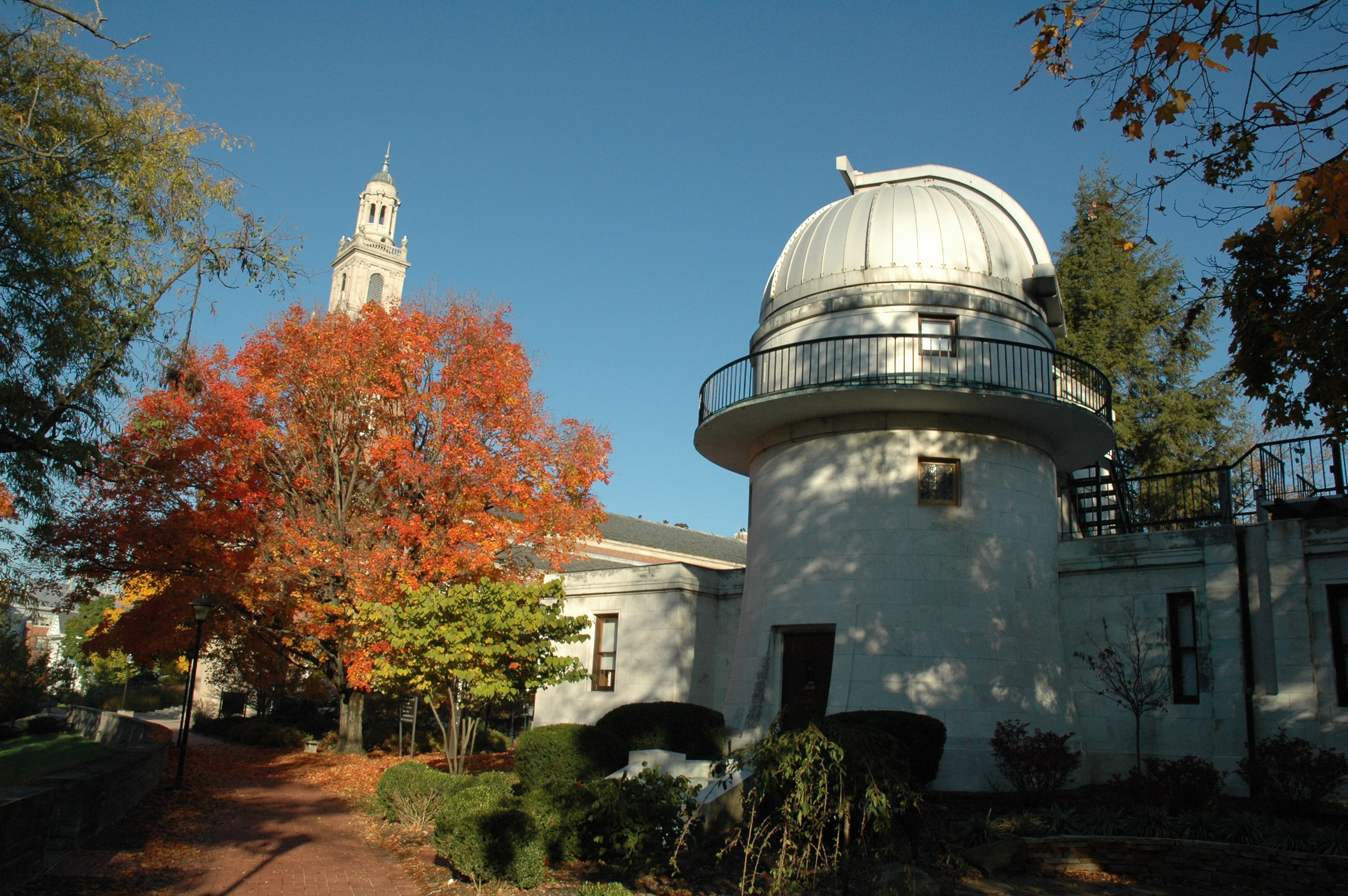
Swasey Observatory at Denison University

In 1885, Swasey completed work at McCormick Observatory on the 45-foot dome, which was the largest in the world, and had a unique, 3 shutter design. In 1887, Swasey built the mount for the 36-inch refracting telescope at Lick Observatory. In 1898, he manufactured a dividing engine for the U.S. Naval Observatory that was used to make the meridian circles. Both the building and dome of the Dominion Astrophysical Observatory were made by Warner and Swasey Co. Other observatory telescopes and components were built by the company at the Kenwood Observatory, Yerkes Observatory, Argentine National Observatory, the Swasey Observatory at Denison University, and the Case School of Applied Science Observatory.

From 1904 until 1905, he was the president of the American Society of Mechanical Engineers.

== Legacy ==
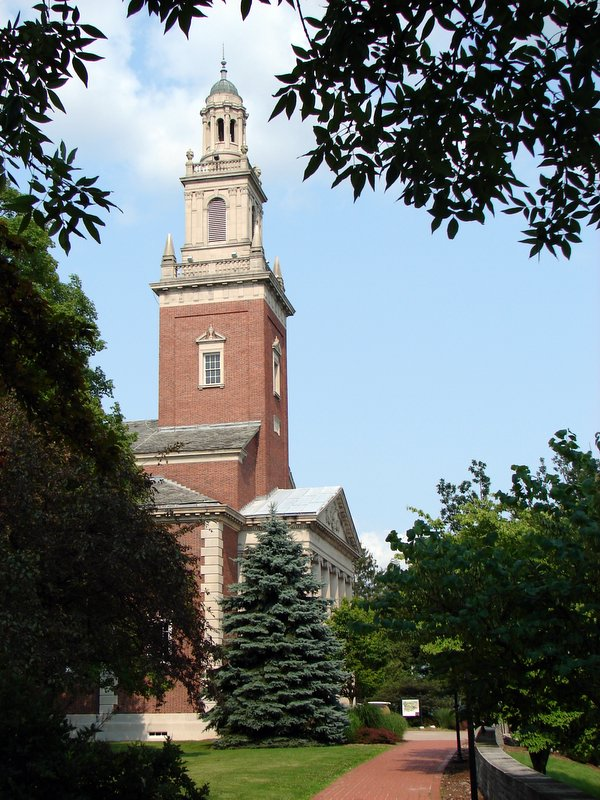
Swasey Chapel at Denison University

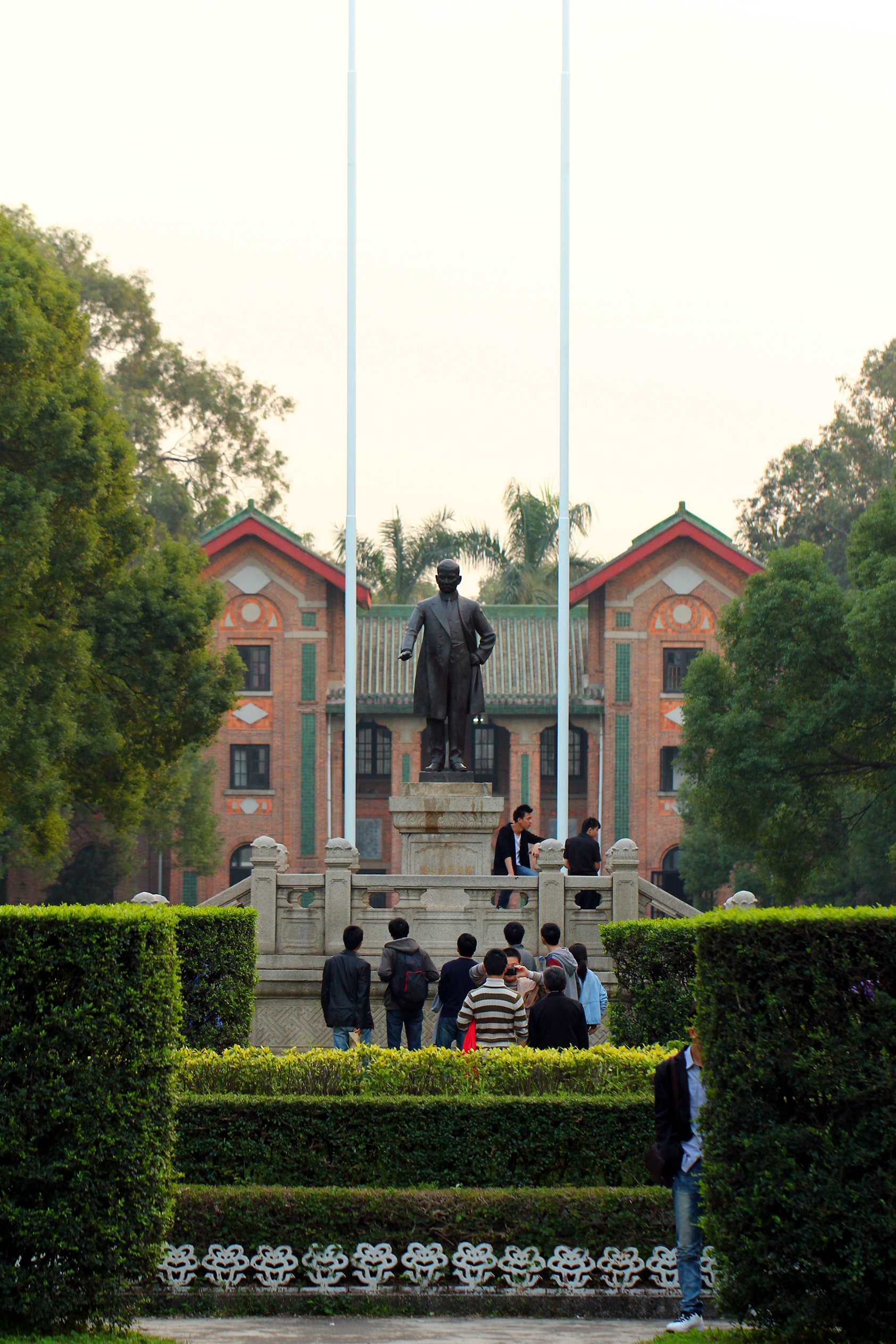
Swasey Hall in front of the statue of Sun Yat-sen at Sun Yat-sen University, Guangzhou, China.

Both Warner and Swasey were amateur astronomers. When they became trustees of the Case School of Applied Science, they donated to the school their private observatory, which they had built between their neighboring houses in East Cleveland. Relocated to a new building, this became the Warner and Swasey Observatory. It was dedicated in 1920. The observatory maintained by the department today is still known by this name today.

Swasey Hall (1917, "懷士堂"), a red brick hall, is the landmark of Sun Yat-sen University, one of the top colleges in China. It was named after Swasey for his US$25000 donation to the then university Christian YMCA society hall. Now it serves as a conference hall.

Other donations made by Swasey include the Swasey Chapel at Denison University in Granville, Ohio (1924), a bandstand in Exeter by architect Henry Bacon (1916), a library building to Colgate Rochester Divinity School and the endowment of a chair for a professor of physics at the Case School of Applied Sciences. The chimes in the chapel were included as a memorial to his wife, Lavinia Marston Swasey.

Swasey died in Exeter. The Warner & Swasey Company he cofounded would continue until 1980, when it was acquired by Bendix Corporation.

== Awards and honors ==
- The crater Swasey on the Moon is named after him, as is the asteroid 992 Swasey.
- At CWRU, the chair of "Ambrose Swasey Professor of Physics" was named for his endowment. (Lawrence M. Krauss was named to this position in 1993.)
- In 1916 he was elected an honorary member of the American Society of Mechanical Engineers.
- In 1919 he was elected to the American Philosophical Society
- In 1922 he was elected to the United States National Academy of Sciences
- In 1932 he was awarded the Franklin Medal.
- in 1933 he was awarded the ASME Medal.
- In 1936 he was awarded the Hoover Medal.
- Swasey was a member of the United States National Research Council.
- In 1982 Swasey was elected to the Machine Tool Hall of Fame of the American Precision Museum.

== Bibliography ==
- American Precision Museum (1982), "Ambrose Swasey (1846–1937)", Machine Tool Hall of Fame, American Precision Museum, archived from the original on 2011-07-19
- Warner & Swasey Company (1920), The Warner & Swasey Company, 1880–1920, Cleveland, Ohio: Warner & Swasey Company.
- Warner & Swasey Company (1930), The Warner & Swasey Company, 1880–1930, Cleveland, Ohio: Warner & Swasey Company.
