= Clay Blair =

American historian (1925–1998)

Clay Drewry Blair Jr. (May 1, 1925 – December 16, 1998) was an American journalist and author, best known for his books on military history. Blair wrote some two dozen history books and hundreds of magazine articles that reached a popular audience.

== Early life and military service ==
Blair was born in Lexington, Virginia.

Blair enlisted in the United States Navy in 1943, during World War II. Around 1944, he attended Basic Enlisted Submarine School followed by Quartermaster Class A School, after which he was assigned to Sperry (AS-12), a submarine tender.

During 1945, Blair was posted to the fleet submarine Guardfish (SS-217). He was on that boat's last two war patrols off Japan.

Blair served on Guardfish into 1946, after the war was over, then was discharged from the Navy. His highest rank was Quartermaster 2nd Class.

== Education and journalism career ==
Blair attended both Tulane University and Columbia University. He attended the first as a prospective architecture student, but decided instead to go to New York and attend the Columbia School of Journalism. In the end, he did not graduate from either institutions.

Blair later wrote for Time and Life magazines. At Time-Life during the 1950s he covered the Pentagon, focusing on issues of national security and nuclear weapons policy.

Over the years, Blair worked for the Curtis Publishing Company as both a correspondent and an editor. In particular, he became editor-in-chief of The Saturday Evening Post during the early 1960s. During his stint there, he made an emphasis of publishing exclusive reports but also faced a series of libel suits, at least one of which was successful. Beginning in 1962, Blair was also in editorial charge of all of Curtis Publishing's other magazines in addition to the Post, and held the titles of executive vice president and director. He departed Curtis Publishing in 1964 during a struggle for control of the company.

Following that, he became a full-time freelance writer. He lived in Wisconsin but often travelled to various locations to research materials for his books.

He was for many years married to Joan Blair, who co-wrote some of his books. Prior to that marriage he was married to Agnes Kemp Devereux Blair, with whom he had seven children. That marriage resulted in a divorce.

== Historian ==
One of Blair's first books, The Hydrogen Bomb: The Men, The Menace, The Mechanism (1954), was co-written with Time's Washington bureau chief, James R. Shepley, and provoked considerable controversy at the time with its charges that the U.S. development of the hydrogen bomb had been intentionally delayed by some scientists led by J. Robert Oppenheimer and that the Los Alamos Laboratory had been infiltrated by Communists. While the book was positively reviewed across a large number of newspapers and magazines at the time of publication, several scientists who had worked at Los Alamos on the bomb's development soon issued statements refuting its narrative. Interviews conducted during the mid-to-late-1950s (but not published until many decades later) showed almost no scientists speaking well of the book, even those portrayed favorably within it. Subsequent scholarship has established that the Shepley and Blair account was largely inaccurate and was guided by stark H-bomb proponent, and Oppenheimer antagonist, Lewis Strauss.

Blair later earned trust as a collaborator when he assisted General Omar Bradley in the writing of his autobiography, A General's Life (1983), published after the general's death.

Blair's history of the Korean War, The Forgotten War: America in Korea, 1950–1953 (1987) is considered one of the definitive historical works on the war. This work was notable for its criticism of senior American political and military leaders. Blair criticizes President Harry S. Truman and his Secretary of Defense, Louis A. Johnson, for failing to maintain the military's readiness in the years immediately following World War II. His history, while comprehensive, primarily employs a top-down perspective, with less emphasis on individual soldiers than on larger operational issues and the perspectives of general and field-grade officers. He has also been criticized by some historians for not making sufficient use of Communist sources.

Blair also wrote extensively on the submarine war of World War II, notably in the bestselling Silent Victory: The U.S. Submarine War Against Japan (1975), considered the definitive work on the Pacific submarine war.

Silent Victory was also Blair's most popular book. It, and several other of this works, were selected by various kinds of book of the month clubs, a target audience that was aimed at by Blair and his wife.

Blair's last books were Hitler's U-Boat War: The Hunters, 1939–1942 (1996), followed by Hitler's U-Boat War: The Hunted, 1942–1945 (1998). The first of these was criticized by Gary E. Weir of the U.S. Naval Historical Center. Weir pointed out the lack of footnotes in the text, Blair's inability to read German and dependence on translations, his failure to consult the German Federal Military Archives or Michael Salawski's book Die deutsche Seekriegsleitung, 1935–1945 as well as his "painfully obvious bias in favor of the U.S. Navy, and expressions of stereotypical sarcasm aimed at the French and Italians." Weir said that Blair "missed the point" by failing to appreciate the "technically and strategically revolutionary" nature of the Type XXI U-boat and preferring to focus on "solvable engineering problems". Weir dismissed Blair's fundamental assumptions and theses on the German Navy as primitive and anachronistic and called Hitler's U-Boat War a "handicapped chronicle".

== Novelist ==
Blair also published fiction, such as Pentagon Country (1970). His novels tended to have military settings and focus on themes of ambition and hypocrisy.

== Death ==
Blair died of a heart attack in 1998 at age 73 on Washington Island, Wisconsin.

== Books by Clay Blair ==
Non-fiction

- The Atomic Submarine and Admiral Rickover (Henry Holt, 1954)
- The Hydrogen Bomb: The Men, The Menace, The Mechanism (David McKay, 1954) (with James R. Shepley)
- Beyond Courage (David McKay, 1955)
- Nautilus 90 North (World Publishing, 1959) (Cmdr. William R. Anderson with Clay Blair Jr.)
- Diving for Pleasure and Treasure (World Publishing, 1960)
- Always Another Dawn: The Story of a Rocket Test Pilot (World Publishing, 1960) (A. Scott Crossfield with Clay Blair Jr.)
- The Strange Case of James Earl Ray (Bantam, 1969)
- Survive! (Berkley Publishing, 1973)
- Silent Victory: The U.S. Submarine War Against Japan (J.B. Lippincott, 1975)
- The Search for J.F.K. (Berkley Publishing, 1976) (with Joan Blair)
- MacArthur: Korea and the Undoing of an American Hero (Doubleday, 1977)
- Combat Patrol (Bantam, 1978) (condensed version of Silent Victory)
- Return from The River Kwai (Simon & Schuster, 1979) (with Joan Blair)
- Beyond Courage: Escape Tales of Airmen in the Korean War (Ballantine Books, 1983)
- A General's Life: An Autobiography by General of the Army, Omar N. Bradley (Simon & Schuster, 1983) (with Omar N. Bradley)
- Ridgway's Paratroopers: The American Airborne in World War II (Dial Press, 1985)
- The Forgotten War: America in Korea, 1950–1953 (Times Books, 1987)
- Hitler's U-Boat War: The Hunters, 1939–1942 (Random House, 1996)
- Hitler's U-Boat War: The Hunted, 1942–1945 (Random House, 1998)

Fiction

- The Board Room (E.P. Dutton, 1969)
- The Archbishop (World Publishing, 1970)
- Pentagon Country (McGraw-Hill, 1971)
- Scuba! (Bantam, 1977) (with Joan Blair)
- Mission Tokyo Bay (Bantam, 1980) (with Joan Blair)
- Swordray's First Three Patrols (Bantam, 1980) (with Joan Blair)

Ghostwriter

- Valley of the Shadow (David McKay, 1955) (by Major Ward Millar)
- The Voyage of the Nina II (World Publishing, 1963) (by Robert Marx)

Source: Virtual Exhibits: Clay Blair, Jr.
