= Warner and Swasey Observatory =

Observatory in Ohio, US

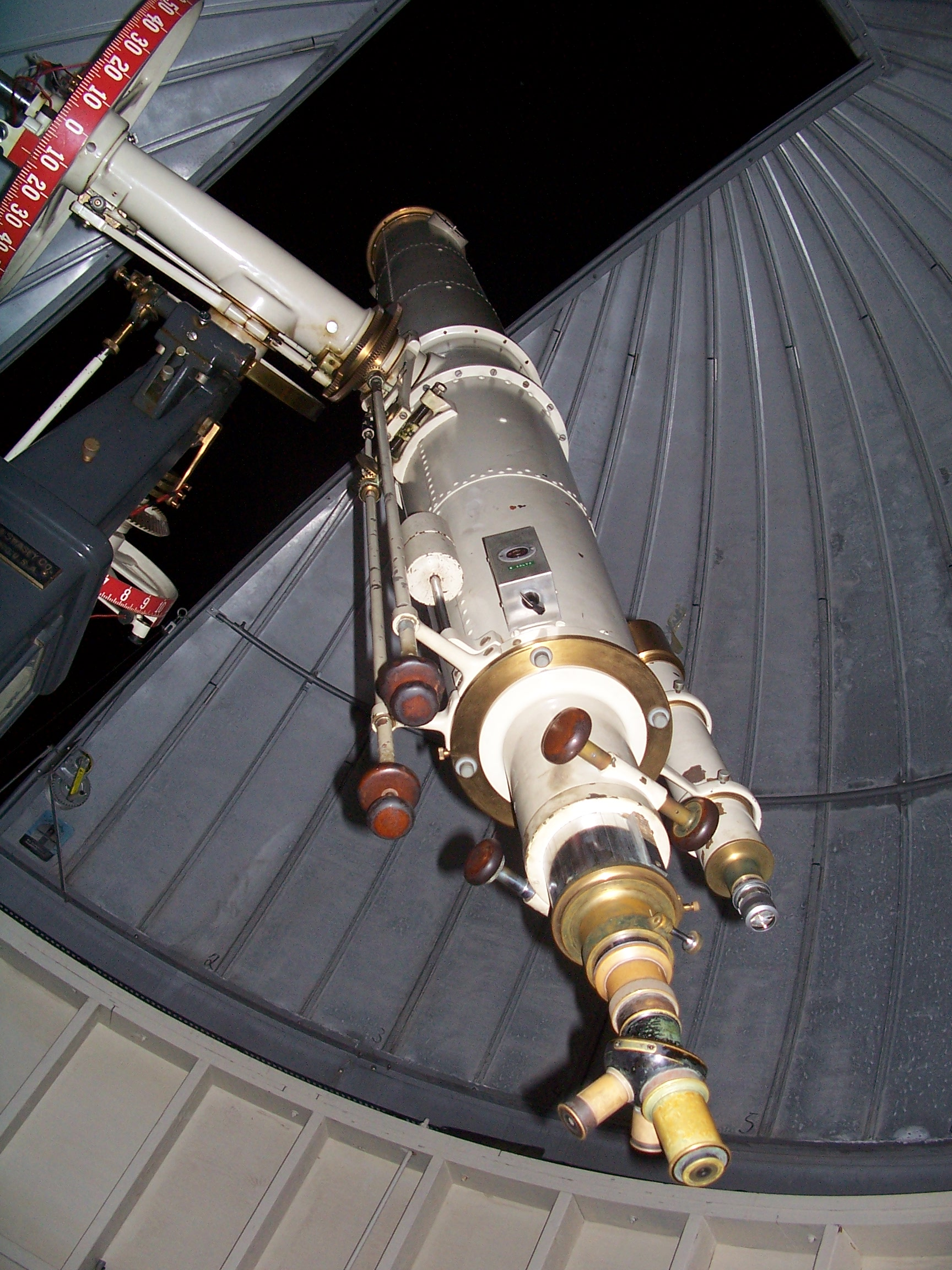
- The rooftop telescope with the dome open
- Organization: Case Western Reserve University
- Observatory code: 773
- Location: Cleveland, Ohio (USA)
- Coordinates: 41°32′10″N 81°34′6.5″W

Telescopes
- Burrell Schmidt Telescope: 24" Schmidt
- Rooftop Telescope: 9.5" refractor
- Related media on Commons

The Warner and Swasey Observatory is the astronomical observatory of Case Western Reserve University. Named after Worcester R. Warner and Ambrose Swasey, who built it at the beginning of the 20th century, it was initially located on Taylor Road in East Cleveland, Ohio, USA. The observatory, which at that time housed a 9.5-inch (24 cm) refractor, was donated in 1919 to the Case School of Applied Science. The newer 24-inch (61 cm) Burrell Schmidt telescope was built in 1939.

Due to rising light pollution in Cleveland, a new station in Geauga County's Montville Township was established in 1950s. Named after Jason John Nassau, the station initially housed the Burrell telescope, which was later moved to Kitt Peak National Observatory. Instead of Burrell the station was equipped with the 36-inch robotic telescope. In 2008 Nassau Station was sold to the Geauga Park District and subsequently incorporated into its Observatory Park.

The observatory currently operates the old 9.5-inch refractor (now known as the rooftop telescope) at the university's University Circle campus, and the Burrell Schmidt telescope at Kitt Peak National Observatory in Arizona. The old site on Taylor Road was sold in 1983.

== History ==
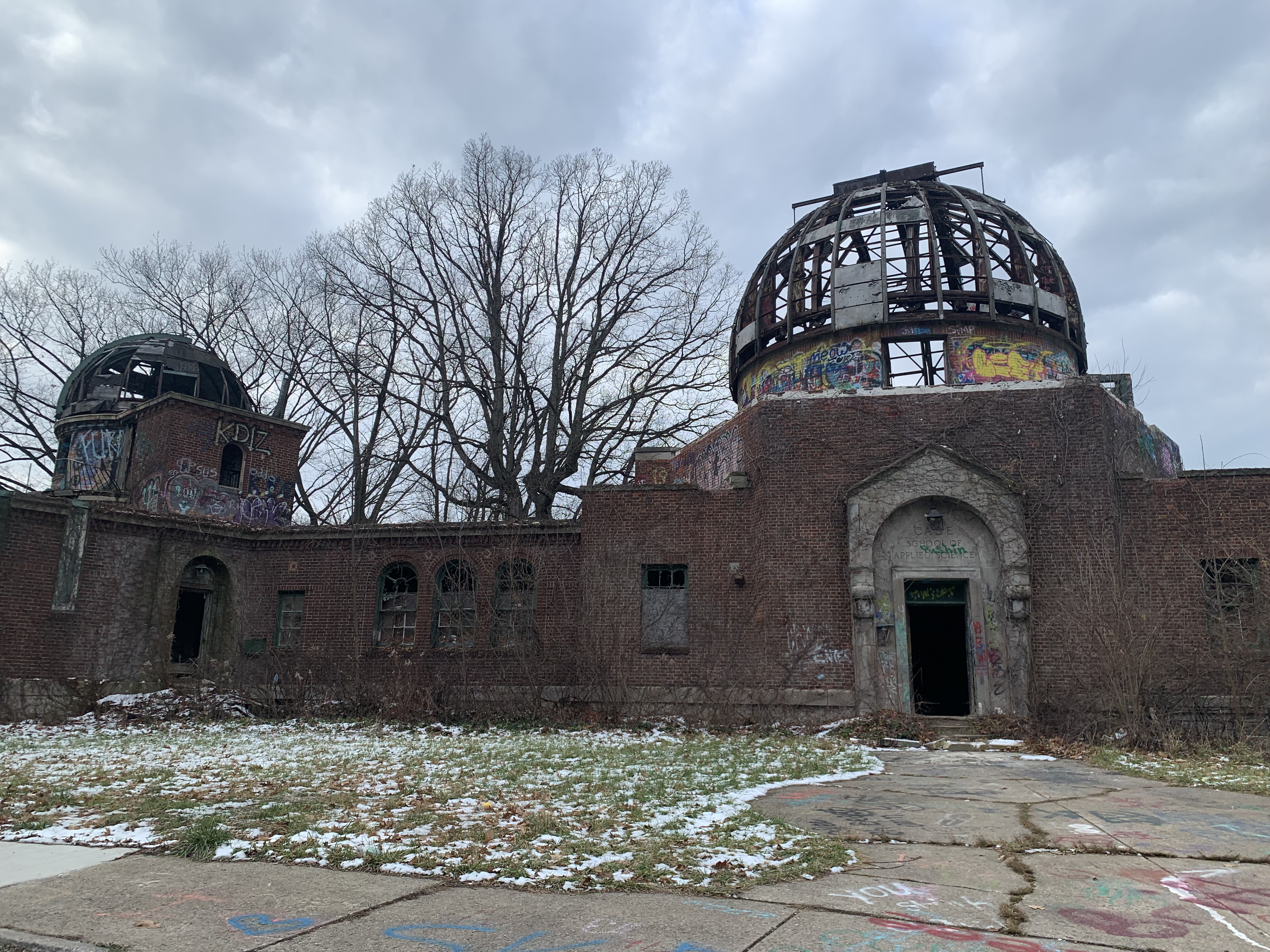
The abandoned Taylor Road facility of the Warner and Swasey Observatory in 2023

The observatory was originally built by Worcester Reed Warner and Ambrose Swasey, owners of Warner & Swasey Company, which made precision instruments, machine tools, and telescopes in the late 19th and early 20th centuries. They also built their own private observatory between their neighboring houses in East Cleveland. When they became trustees of the Case School of Applied Science (later renamed to Case Institute of Technology), they gave the observatory to the school in 1919. The school's observatory building was located on Taylor Road four miles east of the university campus and housed a 9.5-inch refractor, and was dedicated in 1920. The building was designed by the firm of Walker and Weeks. In subsequent years the observatory grew to house several more telescopes and instruments, such as the 24-inch Burrell Schmidt telescope, as well as an astronomical library and public lecture hall.

In the 1950s, it became apparent that the light pollution from Cleveland was beginning to make cutting-edge research impossible from the East Cleveland site. A new site was constructed 30 miles to the east in Geauga County, known today as the Nassau Station, and the Burrell Schmidt telescope was moved to this location. In order to compensate for the move, a 36-inch telescope was soon installed at the Taylor Road facility.

In 1978, the Astronomy Department of Case Western Reserve University made a deal with the Association of Universities for Research in Astronomy (AURA) to build a new observatory at Kitt Peak National Observatory to house the Burrell Schmidt. The telescope was moved from Ohio to Arizona in May 1979, and in 1980 the 36-inch reflector on Taylor Road was moved to the Nassau Station. This meant no further astronomical work was done at the Taylor Road facility, and as a result the faculty and resources of the original observatory were moved to the main campus of Case Western Reserve University in 1982. The Taylor Road facility was sold in 1983, was abandoned, and remained neglected until 2005 when it was sold to a couple who planned to convert the building into a residence. The plans stalled when its new owner was convicted of mortgage fraud and sent to prison in 2007. Currently, the observatory building is abandoned.

== Telescopes ==
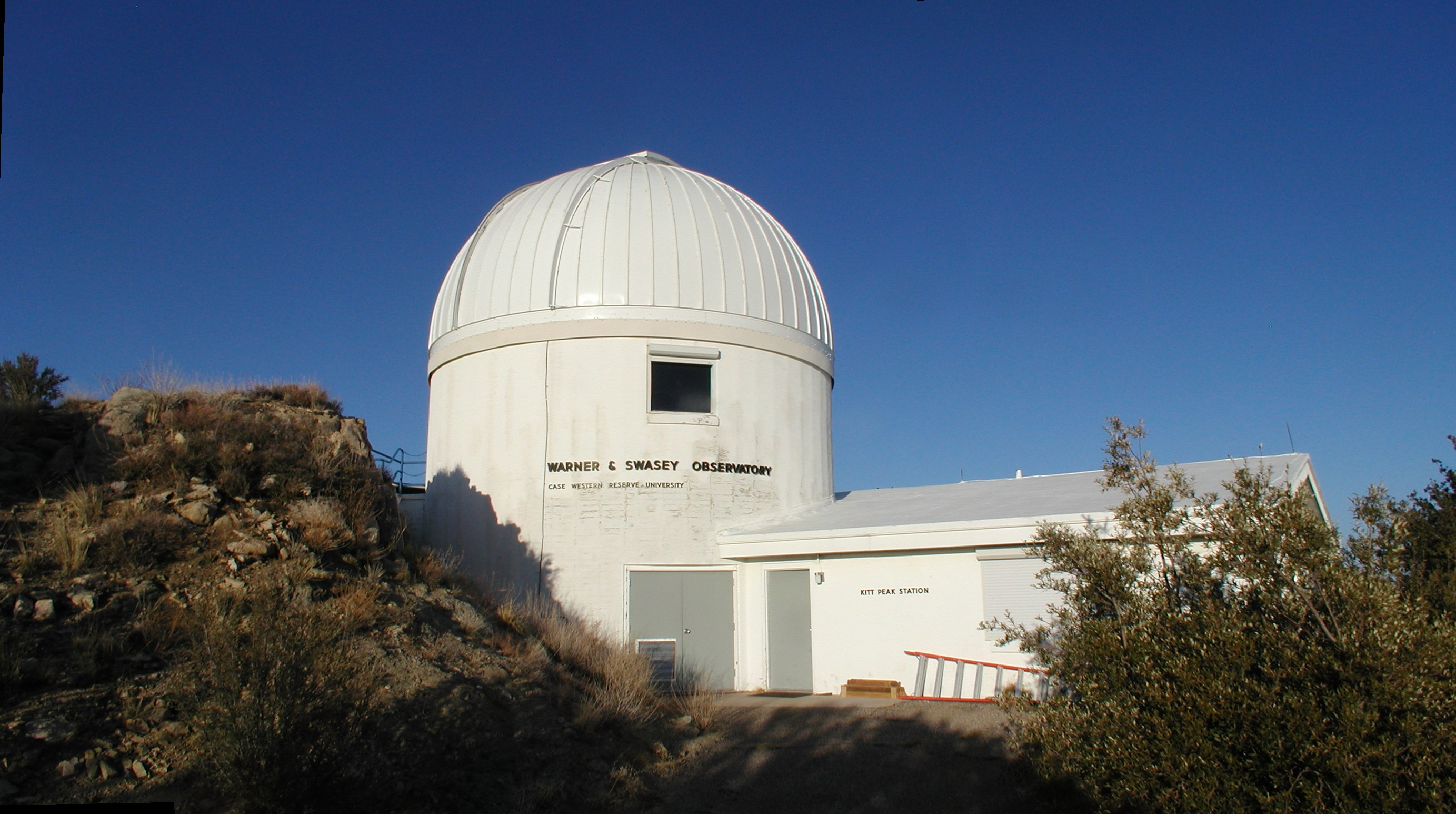
The Warner and Swasey Observatory at Kitt Peak National Observatory

=== Burrell Schmidt Telescope ===
The 24-inch Burrell Schmidt Telescope was originally built in 1939 by Warner & Swasey Company of Cleveland, Ohio and was housed at the Taylor Road facility. It is currently housed at Kitt Peak National Observatory near Tucson, Arizona. The telescope recently had its optics upgraded with a very wide field of view CCD array, which is much more sensitive than the photographic plates. It is the instrument used today by the Case astronomers.

=== Nassau Station Robotic Observatory ===
The Nassau Station, originally constructed in the 1950s, currently houses a 36-inch reflecting telescope. It is named after observatory director Jason John Nassau, who was a prominent astronomer at the time. Work was carried out in the 1990s to make the telescope capable of remote viewing, making it one of the first telescopes to be used in this manner. However, it was seldom used by Case astronomers due to increased light pollution from Cleveland and the enhanced capabilities of the Burrell Schmidt. As a result, the observatory was left unused for several years until 2008, when it was sold to the Geauga Park District. The park district reopened the facility as part of its Observatory Park on June 16, 2012. The park was designated as a dark sky park by the International Dark Sky Association.

=== Rooftop Telescope ===
The Rooftop Telescope is a 9.5-inch refractor that was originally constructed in 1894 by Warner and Swasey for their own use. The telescope was the first instrument of the Warner and Swasey Observatory and was originally used at the Taylor Road facility, but was put into storage when the Astronomy Department of Case Western Reserve University was relocated to the A. W. Smith building on the main campus. In 1986 the telescope was reinstalled in a new dome on the roof of the A. W. Smith building.

The telescope remains in excellent condition today and is available for use by all students, faculty, and staff at CWRU once they go through a seminar on proper telescope use. It is also often used for public observing nights by the university's Physics and Astronomy Club.

== Research ==
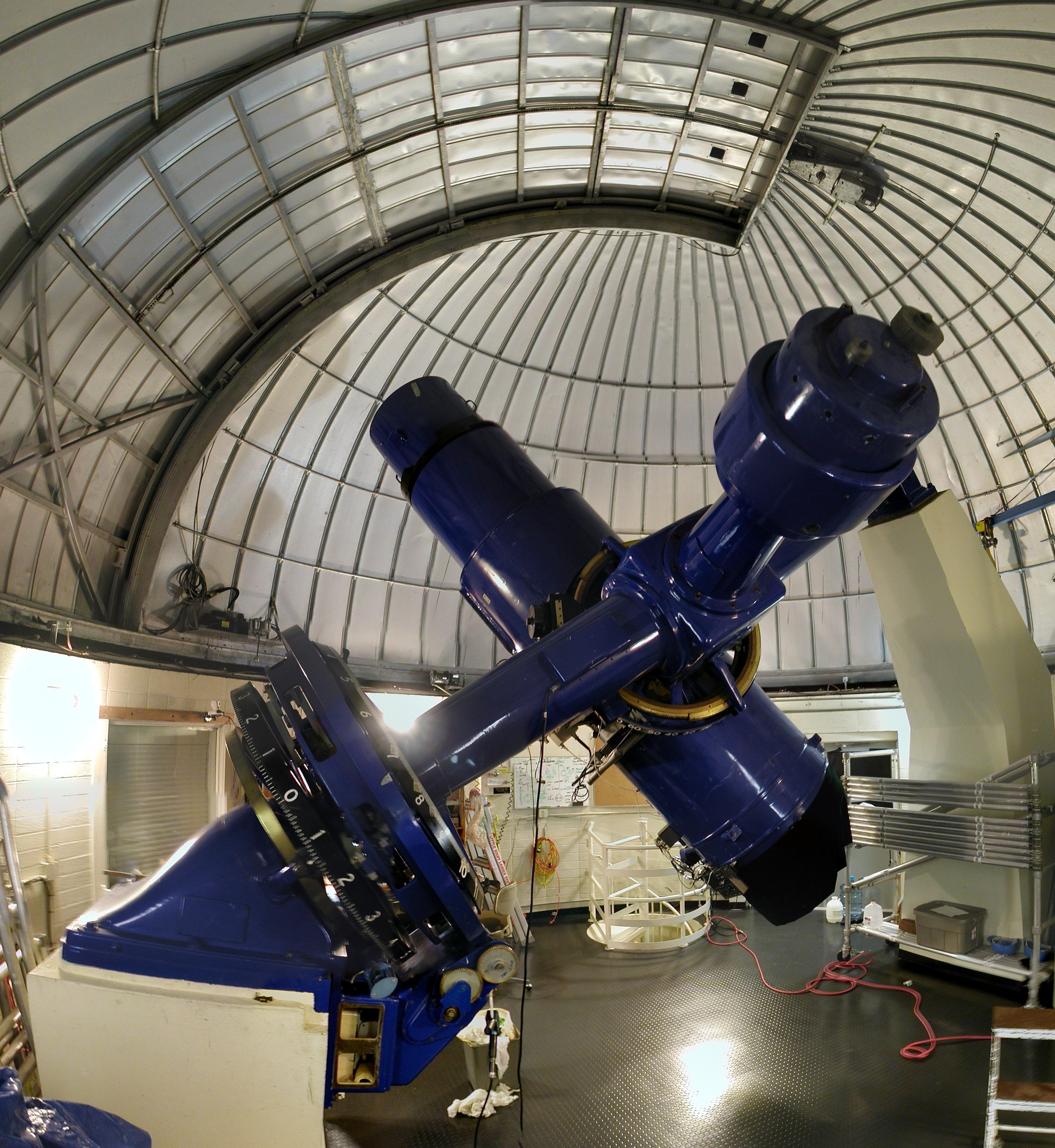
The Burrell Schmidt telescope at the Warner and Swasey Observatory at Kitt Peak National Observatory

Observers using the Warner and Swasey Observatory have made important contributions to astronomical research. An early example is work carried out by the observatory's then director, Jason Nassau, on the classification of carbon stars and M-type stars in 1949; more recently, observations made using the Burrell Schmidt telescope led to the discovery of the galaxy Andromeda VIII in 2003. This galaxy orbits the more famous Andromeda Galaxy, and was previously undiscovered due to its position in front of the bright disk of the parent galaxy. The Burrell Schmidt has also recently been used to image the intracluster light in the Virgo Cluster. The intracluster light is a thousand times fainter than the night sky, and was observed after combining seventy images of the cluster which were taken with the Burrell Schmidt telescope.

== See also ==
- List of astronomical observatories
- Sidney Wilcox McCuskey
