= Sidney Wilcox McCuskey =

American mathematician

Sidney W. McCuskey
- Born: February 28, 1907; Cuyahoga Falls, Ohio
- Died: April 22, 1979 (aged 72); Cleveland, Ohio
- Education: Case School of Applied Science; Massachusetts Institute of Technology; Harvard University
- Occupations: Mathematician and astronomer

Sidney Wilcox McCuskey (February 28, 1907 – April 22, 1979) was an American mathematician and astronomer. He was director of the Warner and Swasey Observatory and named emeritus professor of astronomy at Case Western Reserve University.

== Biography ==
He was born in Cuyahoga Falls, Ohio on February 28, 1907, the son of Charles McCuskey and Lottie (née Wilcox). In 1925 Sidney became an amateur radio hobbyist. He matriculated to the Case School of Applied Science where in 1929 he was awarded a B.S. in Civil Engineering. The following year he received his M.S. in mathematics from the Massachusetts Institute of Technology. After a stint at surveying, he was influenced by Jason John Nassau to study astronomy at Harvard University. There his graduate adviser was the Dutch-American astronomer Bart Bok. Receiving his astronomy Ph.D. in 1936 with a thesis titled The Determination of Radial Velocities with the Objective Prism, Dr. McCuskey accepted a job with the department of mathematics at his alma mater, the Case Institute of Technology.

Following his service during the Second World War, he became the Levi Kerr professor of mathematics and astronomy, and chair of the department of mathematics at Case Western Reserve University (CWRU). During this period he served as an assistant to Jason John Nassau at the Warner and Swasey Observatory. Following Nassau's retirement in 1959, Dr. McCuskey was named director of the observatory and chairman of the department of astronomy for the university. He became the first to occupy the Warner Chair of Astronomy at CWRU, and would hold that position until he retired as professor emeritus in 1975.

Dr. McCuskey was a member of the American Association for the Advancement of Science and the American Astronomical Society (AAS); during 1955–1958 he was a councilor for the AAS and in 1966–1968 he served as vice-president. He was an active member of the International Astronomical Union, serving as vice-president of commission 33 during 1967–1970 and president of the same in 1970–1973. He is noted for his contributions to knowledge of the Milky Way galaxy and he wrote several books on mathematics and astronomy during his career. Dying at the age of 72, he was survived by his wife Jeannette (née Scott) and their two sons. The minor planet 2007 McCuskey is named after him.

== Bibliography ==
- An introduction to advanced dynamics (1959)
- Basic physics of the solar system (1961) with Victor M. Blanco
- Introduction to celestial mechanics (1963)
- Topics in higher analysis (1964) with Harold K. Crowder
- Structure and dynamics of the galactic system: a report (1973)
