= Thompson Observatory =

Observatory in Wisconsin, US

- Organization: Beloit College
- Location: Beloit, Wisconsin, United States
- Coordinates: 42.50500°N 89.03167°W
- Established: 1968

Telescopes
- unnamed: 22-inch reflector

The Thompson Observatory was an astronomical observatory at Beloit College in Beloit, Wisconsin. The observatory was built in 1968 to replace the Smith Observatory, which had been built in the 1880s. The new observatory was named in honor of Alfred S. Thompson of the Beloit College Class of 1892.

The instrument was a 22-inch reflecting telescope. It was removed when Chamberlin Hall was demolished to make way for the new Center for the Sciences in 2008-2009.

== See also ==
- List of astronomical observatories
