= Ritter Observatory =

Observatory in Ohio, US

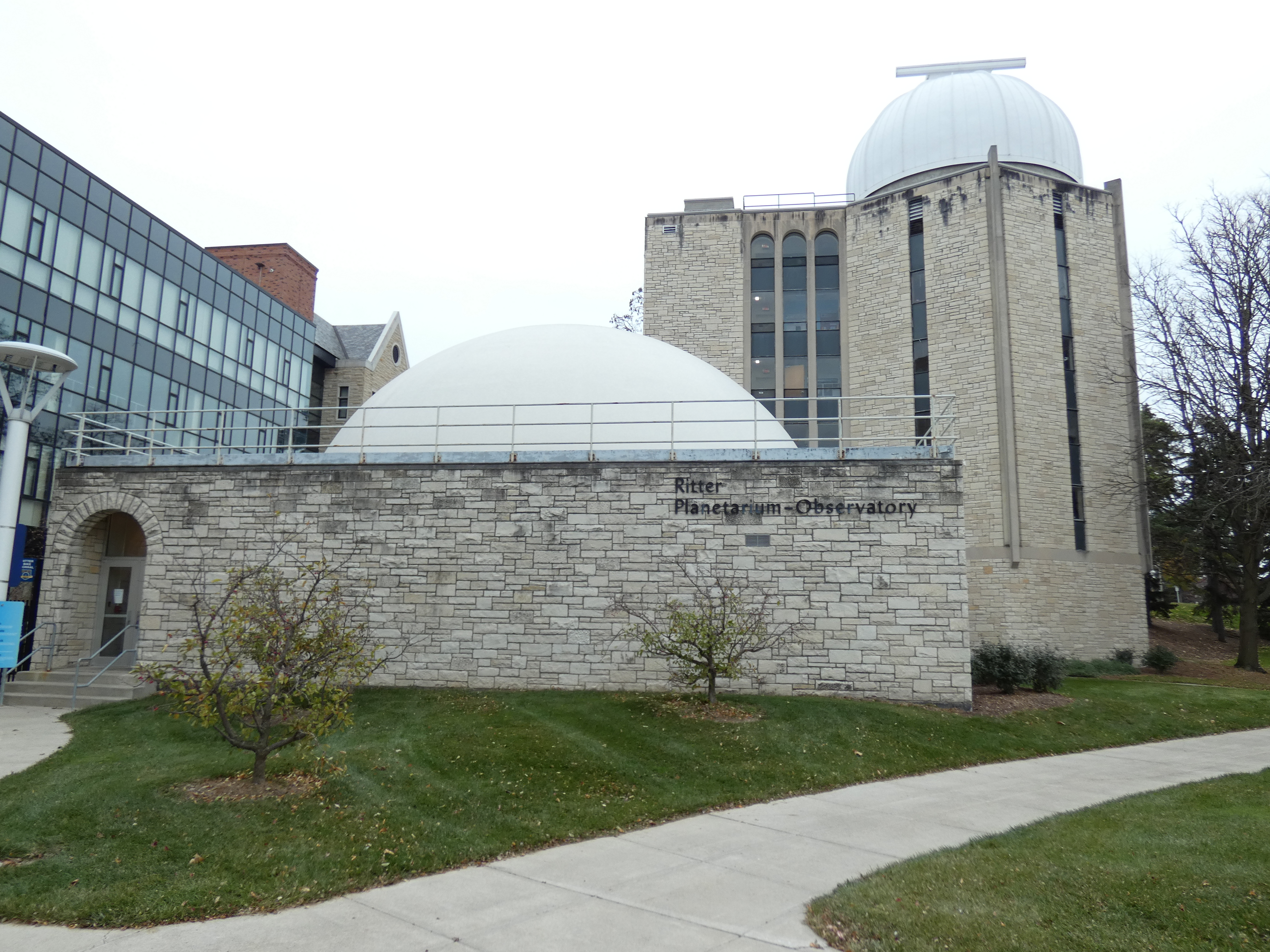
- Organization: University of Toledo
- Location: Toledo, Ohio
- Coordinates: 41.6624°N 83.6123°W
- Altitude: 182 meters (597 ft)
- Established: 1967
- Website: Ritter Observatory

Telescopes
- unnamed telescope: 1.06 m reflector

The Ritter Observatory is an astronomical observatory owned and operated by the University of Toledo (UT) in Toledo, Ohio. Ritter Planetarium is located in the same building, and the university also operates Brooks Observatory in an adjacent building. Ritter Observatory features a 1.06 m (42 in) Ritchey-Chrétien telescope built in 1967 by Warner & Swasey Company of Cleveland, Ohio. It was installed in 1968, and is used primarily for spectroscopy and occasionally for instruction and public viewing events. Research conducted at the observatory focuses on long-term spectroscopic monitoring of stars such as Rigel, Beta Lyrae, and Zeta Tauri.

== See also ==
- Brooks Observatory
- List of astronomical observatories
