= Jason John Nassau =

American astronomer (1893–1965)

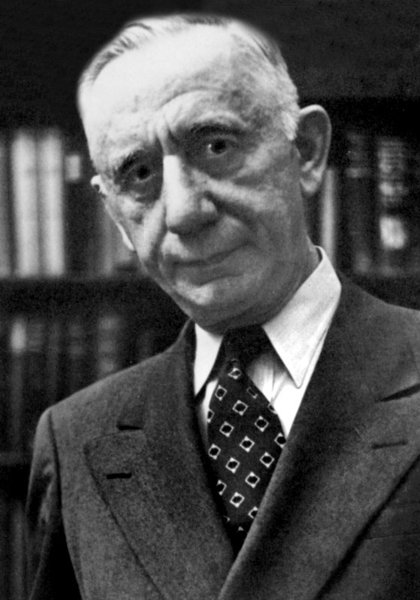
Nassau in 1920

Jason John Nassau (1893–1965) was an American astronomer.

He performed his doctoral studies at Syracuse and gained his Ph.D. in mathematics in 1920. (His thesis was Some Theorems in Alternants.) He then became an assistant professor at the Case Institute of Technology in 1921, teaching astronomy. He continued to instruct at that institution, becoming the university's first chair of astronomy from 1924 until 1959 and chairman of the graduate division from 1936 until 1940. After 1959 he was professor emeritus.

From 1924 until 1959, he was also the director of the Case Western Reserve University (CWRU) Warner and Swasey Observatory in Cleveland, Ohio. He was a pioneer in the study of galactic structure. He also discovered a new star cluster, co-discovered 2 novae in 1961, and developed a technique of studying the distribution of red (M-class or cooler) stars.

In 1922, Nassau led the formation of the Cleveland Astronomical Society, "a club among those citizens of Cleveland and vicinity who were interested in astronomy." He served as the extant organization's first president for 41 years.

== Bibliography ==
- Nassau, Jason John, A Textbook of Practical Astronomy, 1934, New York.

== Honors ==
- The Nassau Astronomical Station at the Warner and Swasey Observatory, Observatory Park, Geauga Park District, is named for him.
- The Jason J. Nassau Prize was established by the Cleveland Astronomical Society in 1965. It is awarded annually to an outstanding senior student in the CWRU Department of Astronomy.
- The Jason J. Nassau Service Award was established by the Cleveland Astronomical Society in 2007 to recognize a person who has shown exemplary leadership and contributions in the Local, National and International Astronomy Community.
- The crater Nassau on the Moon is named after him.
- Asteroid 9240 Nassau is named for him. It was discovered May 31, 1997.
