= James R. Shepley =

American journalist, author and businessman

- Born: James Robinson Shepley; August 16, 1917; Harrisburg, Pennsylvania, U.S.
- Died: November 2, 1988 (aged 71); Houston, Texas, U.S.
- Education: Dickinson College no degree
- Occupations: Journalist; publishing executive
- Years active: 1936–1982
- Notable credits: The Pittsburgh Press; United Press Associations; Time; Life
- Title: President, Time Inc.1969–1980
- Spouses: Jean Stevens (after 1937); Yvonne Hudson (until 1988)
- Children: 8

James Robinson Shepley (August 16, 1917 – November 2, 1988) was an American journalist and businessman who was president of Time Inc. from 1969 to 1980 and was CEO of The Washington Star from 1978 until the paper was shut down in 1981. Shepley was given credit for having expanded Time Inc. into different areas of publishing and into television and video.

== Early life and career ==
Shepley was born on August 16, 1917, in Harrisburg, Pennsylvania. He attended Camp Hill High School in the Harrisburg area, from where he was graduated in 1935.

He then was admitted to nearby Dickinson College, where he was in the class of 1939. There he was a member of the Phi Kappa Psi fraternity.

Shepley had found a first position in newspapers at the local The Harrisburg Daily Patriot, where his father had been the editor. He had also been a stringer for the Associated Press in Harrisburg. After completing his second year at Dickinson he dropped out in 1936, becoming a cub reporter for The Pittsburgh Press. He was still working there as of 1937.

In 1937 he married the former Jean Stevens from Camp Hill. They had two sons and two daughters together.

Following his time in Pittsburgh, he got a job working for United Press Associations, first covering the Pennsylvania General Assembly in Harrisburg from 1937 to 1940. He then went to Washington, D.C., in 1940, where he covered the U.S. Congress for United Press.

== World War II and aftermath ==
In 1942 he began working for Time magazine's Washington bureau. He then became a war correspondent for Time and Life magazine.

He covered the South-East Asian theatre of World War II. In January 1944 he and several other reporters went to Deogarh, Madhya Pradesh, to meet with Brigadier General Frank Merrill, who was showcasing a new U.S. Army long-range penetration special operations jungle warfare unit that had been training in India. The reporters sat around trying to think of an appealing name for the unit that would enthuse the American public; Shepley suggested "Merrill's Marauders", and that name became the one the unit has always been known by. Shepley did not join Merrill's unit for its insertion into the Burma campaign, however, instead moving on to a different assignment.

Shepley also reported from the South West Pacific theatre of World War II, as well as the European theatre of World War II, where he covered the Battle of the Bulge in December 1944. During that battle he was briefly caught behind German lines.

In 1945 he was commissioned as a captain in the Army, as part of the General Staff Corps, and was detailed to the personal staff of Army Chief of Staff George C. Marshall. In that role he accompanied Marshall to the Potsdam Conference and also helped him write an official report regarding the war. In 1946 he was an attaché on the Marshall Mission to China, a mission that attempted, but failed, to negotiate creation of a truce and a unified government between the Chinese Communist Party and the nationalist Kuomintang.

== Bureau chief and book author ==
Subsequently, in 1946 Shepley returned to Time Inc. as a diplomatic correspondent back in Washington. In 1948 he became chief of the Washington bureau, a position he continued to hold into the 1950s. The prominence of his position, his wartime reporting, and his past association with Marshall, all combined to give Shepley unusual access to the U.S. defense and diplomatic establishments.

By 1953, American physicist J. Robert Oppenheimer had taken stances related to the development of the hydrogen bomb and the value and morality of strategic bombardment that led to a concerted effort against Oppenheimer undertaken by the United States Air Force and other elements of the defense and atomic energy establishments. Several Time-Life publications were involved in this and Shepley's role in orchestrating the anti-Oppenheimer effort was seen with dismay by at least one former Time Inc. executive.

This work then grew into a book that Shepley wrote together with a former submariner who was a reporter on his staff, Clay Blair Jr. The resulting Shepley and Blair work, The Hydrogen Bomb: The Men, The Menace, The Mechanism (1954), provoked considerable controversy at the time with its charges that the U.S. development of the hydrogen bomb had been intentionally delayed by some scientists led by Oppenheimer and that the Los Alamos Laboratory had been infiltrated by Communists. While the book was positively reviewed across a large number of newspapers and magazines at the time of publication, several scientists who had worked at Los Alamos on the bomb's development soon issued statements refuting its narrative. Interviews conducted during the mid-to-late-1950s (but not published until many decades later) showed almost no scientists speaking well of the book, even those (including physicist Edward Teller) portrayed favorably within it. Subsequent scholarship has established that the Shepley and Blair account was largely inaccurate, and moreover, that it was guided by stark H-bomb proponent, and Oppenheimer antagonist, Lewis Strauss.

In 1956, Shepley interviewed Secretary of State John Foster Dulles for Life magazine, and Dulles told him that during the Eisenhower administration the United States had on three occasions been on the "brink" of war "and looked it in the face" (the instances were in Korea during the armistice talks in June 1953, Indochina in April 1954, and the Formosa Straits in late 1954–early 1955). The Dulles remark gained considerable attention and the phrase "brinkmanship" became part of Cold War vocabulary.

Shepley left the Washington bureau chief position in 1957 to run Time's North American news service.

On a Time-Life photo shoot in 1957 Shepley met model Yvonne Hudson, originally from California. They subsequently married. She had three daughters, from a previous marriage to World War II fighter ace Elbert Scott McCuskey, whom the Shepleys raised together under his last name. The couple also had a daughter of their own.

As the 1960 United States presidential election got underway, Shepley took a leave of absence in 1959 to act as an advisor to the campaign of Vice President Richard M. Nixon, who was running for president and became the Republican Party nominee. In that capacity he worked for Nixon's unofficial campaign manager, Leonard W. Hall, and alongside other Nixon aides such as James Bassett. One of Shepley's assignments during the summer of 1960 was to negotiate with the U.S. State Department to request alternative funding for Tom Mboya's plan to send Kenyan students to American universities. Shepley obtained a commitment, but those running the program followed their original plan of accepting money from the Joseph P. Kennedy Jr. Foundation instead. Thus began the Kennedy Airlift, to the political benefit of Nixon's general election rival, Senator John F. Kennedy.

== Publishing executive ==
Following Nixon's defeat, Shepley returned to Time Inc., but this time to the business side of the publishing enterprise. He had no business training of any formal nature. He became an executive, first being assistant publisher of Life magazine. Then by 1964, he was publisher of Fortune magazine. Following that, he became publisher of Time magazine, which he was by 1967. Finally in 1969 he became president of Time Inc. During this period he lived in Port Washington, New York, and then in Sands Point, New York.

As an executive, he was known as "Brass Knuckles Shepley" for his blunt and aggressive management style. Indeed, Time Inc.'s own acknowledgement of his passing called him a "brusque but decisive manager". Well-known Time-Life political correspondent Hugh Sidey said that "Shepley was a great boss – tough, curt, no-nonsense but absolutely loyal. He put his faith in reporters and let them go."

During his time as president, Shepley worked closely with chairman of the board Andrew Heiskell and editor-in-chief Hedley Donovan. Time Inc. began Money magazine in 1972, People magazine in 1974, and brought back Life magazine as a monthly in 1978. It acquired the Book of the Month Club. Shepley oversaw the acquisitions of Temple Industries and Inland Container Corporation, two companies in the pulp and paper industry, which were subsequently spun off to form Temple-Inland.

Most significantly, during the mid-1970s Time Inc. cultivated Home Box Office (HBO) as the first nationwide pay television service. Shepley publicly proclaimed what he saw as the potential of HBO back when it was first a small regional service in Wilkes-Barre and a couple of similar towns in eastern Pennsylvania, saying in early 1973, "Time Inc. has long been intrigued with this method of communication. Initial marketing results indicate a bright role for subscription television. It seems clear that people are willing to pay fair prices to see television programs of their choice which are free of commercials." Time Inc. subsequently bought American Television and Communications in 1977, which became its cable television property. Shepley's personal role seeing a corporate vision for HBO and an overall cable strategy was of decisive importance. Shepley's successor as Time Inc. president, J. Richard Munro, has said, "Without any doubt, Jim was the father of HBO. He nurtured it and believed in it. The same was true in cable television, with American Television and Communications."

Not all of Shepley's actions worked out. Shepley was the motivating force behind Time Inc.'s purchase of the money-losing Washington Star for $28 million in 1978, convincing Time's board of directors that owning a daily newspaper in the capital would bring a unique sense of prestige. Despite the paper's labor unions agreeing to work concessions that Shepley demanded, the acquisition failed, as the Star lost a further $85 million before the board shut it down in 1981.

Shepley stepped down as president of Time Inc. in 1980. He remained on the board of directors, serving as chair of the board's executive committee, until he retired in 1982.

== Final years and death ==
Shepley lived in Hartfield, Virginia, after leaving Time Inc. During his retirement he served on the boards of the South Street Seaport Museum, the Pullman Transportation Company, the Henley Group, the Hilton Hotels Corporation, and The Interpublic Group of Companies Inc.

Shepley died at age 71 of cancer at the M.D. Anderson Clinic in Houston, Texas, on November 2, 1988.

== Awards and honors ==
Shepley received an honorary degree from, and gave a commencement address at, Dickinson College in 1959. He received an honorary degree from Clarkson College of Technology in 1966. And he received an honorary degree, and gave a commencement address, at the University of Florida in 1978.

In 1967, Shepley served as national chair for Dickinson College's fund-raising challenge program in association with the Ford Foundation.

The James R. Shepley HBO Communications Center in Hauppauge, New York, is where HBO program signals are sent up to a communications satellite.
