= 2007 McCuskey =

Carbonaceous main-belt asteroid

Discovery
- Discovered by: Indiana University (Indiana Asteroid Program)
- Discovery site: Goethe Link Obs.
- Discovery date: 22 September 1963

Designations
- Named after: Sidney McCuskey (American astronomer)
- Alternative designations: 1963 SQ · 1936 HP; 1941 SW_{1} · 1943 EL; 1947 GE · 1951 LV; 1952 SB_{1} · 1952 UR_{1} 1958 GB · 1963 TL; 1963 VC · 1965 CA; 1965 CC · 1966 OB; 1969 EC_{1} · 1970 QD_{1} A921 EK
- Minor planet category: main-belt · (inner)

Orbital characteristics
- Epoch 4 September 2017 (JD 2458000.5)
- Uncertainty parameter 0
- Observation arc: 64.55 yr (23,576 days)
- Aphelion: 2.6585 AU
- Perihelion: 2.1094 AU
- Semi-major axis: 2.3839 AU
- Eccentricity: 0.1152
- Orbital period (sidereal): 3.68 yr (1,344 days)
- Mean anomaly: 47.384°
- Mean motion: 0° 16^{m} 4.08^{s} / day
- Inclination: 3.0420°
- Longitude of ascending node: 17.043°
- Argument of perihelion: 185.25°

Physical characteristics
- Dimensions: 19.08±3.76 km 20.21±7.11 km 21.78 km (derived); 23.14±0.35 km 23.517±0.181 km 23.97±0.49 km 25.733±0.089 km 33.79±1.31 km 34.727±5.933 km
- Synodic rotation period: 8.603±0.001 h 8.611±0.003 h
- Geometric albedo: 0.023±0.004; 0.032±0.032; 0.0377±0.0067; 0.05±0.03; 0.0558 (derived); 0.06±0.02; 0.062±0.022; 0.063±0.002
- Spectral type: C · S V–R = 0.340±0.040
- Absolute magnitude (H): 11.80 · 12.0 · 12.06±0.05 · 12.1 · 12.32 · 12.45

2007 McCuskey, provisional designation 1963 SQ, is a carbonaceous asteroid from the inner regions of the asteroid belt, approximately 22 kilometers in diameter. It was discovered on 22 September 1963, by astronomers of the Indiana Asteroid Program at Goethe Link Observatory near Brooklyn, Indiana, United States. The asteroid was later named after American astronomer Sidney McCuskey. It orbits the Sun in the inner main-belt at a distance of 2.1–2.7 AU once every 3 years and 8 months.

== Orbit and classification ==
McCuskey is a dark asteroid that orbits the Sun in the inner main-belt at a distance of 2.1–2.7 AU once every 3 years and 8 months (1,344 days). Its orbit has an eccentricity of 0.12 and an inclination of 3° with respect to the ecliptic.

In March 1921, McCuskey was first identified as A921 EK at Heidelberg Observatory. The asteroid's observation arc begins 12 years prior to its official discovery observation, with its identification as 1951 LV at McDonald Observatory in June 1951.

== Physical characteristics ==
McCuskey has been described as a dark C-type asteroid, compatible with the measured color index and opposition/slope parameter.

=== Diameter and albedo ===
Measurements made with the IRAS observatory give a diameter of 33.79 kilometers and a geometric albedo of 0.07. By comparison, measurements with Spitzer's Multiband Imaging Photometer (MIPS) give a diameter of 35.26 kilometers and a geometric albedo of 0.03.

According to the more recent 2015/16 results of the NEOWISE survey carried out by NASA's Wide-field Infrared Survey Explorer, McCuskey measures 19.08 and 20.21 kilometers in diameter and its surface has an albedo of 0.06 and 0.05, respectively.

The Collaborative Asteroid Lightcurve Link derives an albedo of 0.0558 and a diameter of 21.78 kilometers based on an absolute magnitude of 12.06.

=== Lightcurves ===
In March 2013, a rotational lightcurve of McCuskey was obtained from photometric observations by an international collaboration of astronomers. Lightcurve analysis gave a well-defined rotation period of 8.603 hours with a brightness variation of 0.18 magnitude (U=3). The group also determined a V–R color index of 0.340.

Astronomers at Texas A&M University using the 0.6-meter SARA South Telescope at Cerro Tololo in August 2014, determined a concurring period of 8.611 hours with a brightness amplitude of 0.21 magnitude (U=3).

== Naming ==
This minor planet was named in honour of American mathematician and astronomer Sidney Wilcox McCuskey (1907–1979), who was the director of the Warner and Swasey Observatory and president of IAU Commission 33, Structure and Dynamics of the Galactic System. He is best known for his contribution on stellar luminosity and galactic structure. The approved naming citation was published by the Minor Planet Center on 6 June 1982 (M.P.C. 6954).
