= Smith Observatory =

Observatory in Wisconsin, US

- Organization: Beloit College
- Location: Beloit, Wisconsin, United States
- Coordinates: 42.50500°N 89.03167°W
- Established: 1882
- Closed: 1950s

Telescopes
- unnamed: 9.5-inch refractor

Smith Observatory was an observatory at Beloit College in Beloit, Wisconsin. Completed in 1882, the observatory was funded by Janette S. Herrick and named in memory of her brother, John F. Smith. It served the campus from 1882 until the 1950s. In 1967, it was used as a coffee house before being torn down in 1969. It was replaced by the Thompson Observatory.

== Directors ==
- Professor Smith (1882-?)
- Clement Rood

== Telescope ==
- 9 1/2-inch (24.1-cm) Alvan Clark & Sons refracting telescope with clock drive

== See also ==
- List of astronomical observatories
