= Brooks Astronomical Observatory =

Astronomical observatory in Michigan, US

Brooks Astronomical Observatory
Organization	Central Michigan University
Location	Mount Pleasant, Michigan
Coordinates
Altitude	257 feet
Webpage
Telescopes
Telescope	DFM 16 inch reflector.

Brooks Astronomical Observatory is an astronomical observatory owned and operated by Central Michigan University. It is located in Mount Pleasant, Michigan (USA). The observatory was established in 1964 and is located on the roof of the Brooks Hall science building. The building and observatory are named after Kendall P. Brooks, an instructor of astronomy and other subjects from 1910-1947.

The original 20-inch (50-cm) reflector functioned poorly and was replaced in 1977 by a 14-inch (35-cm) Schmidt-Cassegrain. This was replaced in 1996 with a 16-inch (40-cm) computer-controlled Cassegrain reflector manufactured by DFM Engineering. The DFM telescope is equipped for CCD direct imaging, medium-dispersion spectroscopy, and visual observation. Professional work at the observatory has included photoelectric and visual timings of lunar and asteroidal occultations; photometric measures of variable stars, cluster stars, and spectroscopic binaries; and astrometry of minor planets and comets. Monthly public open nights were established in 1976.

== See also ==
- List of astronomical observatories
