= Elbert S. McCuskey =

Elbert Scott McCuskey
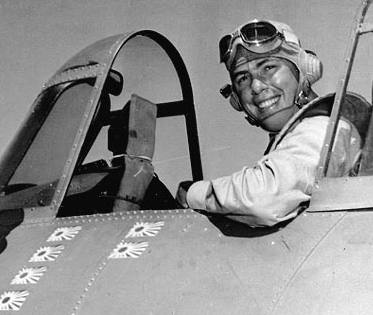
- Born: February 9, 1915; Little Rock, Arkansas
- Died: June 15, 1997 (aged 82); Clearwater, Florida
- Military career
- Allegiance: United States of America
- Branch: United States Navy
- Service years: 1938–1965
- Rank: Captain
- Conflicts: World War II: Marshalls–Gilberts raids; Battle of the Coral Sea; Battle of Midway; Korean War Vietnam War
- Awards: Navy Cross (2); Distinguished Flying Cross (5); Air Medal (14)

Elbert Scott McCuskey (1915–1997) was a World War II US Navy fighter ace. He participated in the Battle of the Coral Sea and the Battle of Midway, for which he was awarded two Navy Crosses, one for each battle. By the end of the war, he was credited with 13 1/2 aerial victories.

== Early career ==
McCuskey was born on 9 February 1915 in Little Rock, Arkansas. He grew up in the Little Rock area and in Stuttgart, Arkansas.

He joined the United States Navy (USN) in 1938 and earned his wings in October 1939 at Naval Air Station Pensacola. Commissioned as ensign, he initially served in the Reserve.

In late 1941, he was part of VF-42 on the carrier Yorktown, conducting patrols in the Atlantic Ocean to protect the merchant ships heading for Britain. After the Attack on Pearl Harbor, Yorktown, with his squadron still aboard, was transferred to the Pacific. In February 1942, he participated in the Marshalls–Gilberts raids, and was credited with shooting down a Kawanishi H6K flying boat (shared with his wingman, Ensign John P. Adams). He was later promoted to Lieutenant (jg).

== Coral Sea ==
On 4 May 1942, Yorktown took part in the operation against the Imperial Japanese Navy's (IJN) Invasion of Tulagi in the Solomon Islands. McCuskey flew an afternoon patrol over the Florida Islands, where he and his division of four Grumman F4F Wildcats (led by Lieutenant(jg) Bill Leonard) strafed a beached Japanese minesweeper near Tulagi and the destroyer Yūzuki heading towards Savo Island. This resulted in the death of the destroyer's captain and several of the ship's crew. On the return flight, McCuskey and his wingman, Ensign John P. Adams, got separated from the rest of the division and were forced to land on a beach on the south-east part of Guadalcanal. They were helped by the natives before the destroyer Hammann picked them up. As a result of getting lost and ditching at Guadalcanal, he was grounded for two days by the squadron commander. This prevented him from flying the evening mission of 7 May with Lieutenant Commander James Flatley that intercepted the IJN strike force (despite him begging to go).

On 8 May, McCuskey was restored to duty and flew escort for the USN strike force against the IJN carriers Shōkaku and Zuikaku. During the mission, his division was attacked by two Mitsubishi A6M Zero fighters, one of which he managed to shoot down. Afterwards, three more Combat Air Patrol (CAP) Zeros attacked the Douglas TBD Devastators that McCuskey's division was protecting. One of them, most likely Petty Officer Sadamu Komachi, chased McCuskey into a cloud, and out of the fight. However, the escorting Wildcats successfully protected the torpedo bombers, as none were lost during the attack on Shōkaku. Near the enemy carriers, McCuskey encountered two more Zeros and escaped by diving into a rain squall. He returned to the US fleet and landed on the damaged Lexington, as he could not locate Yorktown. Lexington later sank with his Wildcat fighter on board. After the battle, he returned to Yorktown, and VF-42 was merged into VF-3, which was commanded by Lieutenant Commander John Thach.

== Midway ==
During the Battle of Midway on 4 June 1942, McCuskey was part of the CAP that protected Task Force 17. His division intercepted the first strike wave of 18 Aichi D3A dive bombers from the undamaged Hiryū led by Lieutenant Michio Kobayashi. Attacking ahead of the others, he made a side-on pass against the Japanese lead division, then found himself heading into the second division head-on. In the resulting chaos, he claimed three dive bombers destroyed (before running out of ammunition), and caused the enemy formation to disintegrate, leaving them easy targets for the approaching Wildcats. Nevertheless, seven D3A dive bombers survived the gauntlet to hit Yorktown, leaving her heavily damaged, and he was forced to land on Enterprise. Later that afternoon, he led a division of four Wildcats off Enterprise for another CAP sortie over Task Force 17. His flight ambushed several Zeros, claiming three, including two for McCuskey (he in fact shot down one and damaged the other). However, McCuskey was himself jumped by a Zero flown by Kaga ace Akira Yamamoto. McCuskey's wingman, who Yamamoto had not seen, intervened and drove the Zero away. In the meantime, Nakajima B5N torpedo bombers managed to cripple Yorktown, and McCuskey again landed on Enterprise.

== Later in war ==
After the Battle of Midway, McCuskey was transferred back to United States, where he worked as a flight instructor. In this period he was located at Naval Air Station Norfolk.

En route back to the United States, he had a shipboard romance with Yvonne Hudson, who was returning from Hawaii to her native Los Angeles. They were married on June 7, 1943, in Stuttgart, Arkansas; due to McCuskey's celebrity as a fighter ace, a story about the wedding was filed by the Associated Press and carried in a number of newspapers around the country.

In late 1943, McCuskey joined VF-8 on the carrier Bunker Hill and flew the Grumman F6F Hellcat. During VF-8's deployment, from March to October 1944, he claimed seven more aerial victories.

In addition to the two Navy Crosses, McCuskey was awarded five Distinguished Flying Crosses and fourteen Air Medals.

== Post-war career ==
After the war, McCuskey stayed in the Navy and became a strategic planner in the Office of the Chief of Naval Operations, living in Washington, D.C. He received a master's degree in economics from Georgetown University, a doctorate in economics from Nova University, and a law degree from the University of Alabama (but never practiced law). He taught at both the Naval War College and the Industrial College of the Armed Forces.

He and his wife Yvonne had three daughters together. That marriage subsequently ended in divorce (she remarried James R. Shepley, a reporter and publishing executive). McCuskey subsequently married his wife Patty and they raised a son and a daughter.

He retired from the navy as a captain in 1965. He then moved to Clearwater, Florida, where he became a professor of economics at St. Petersburg Junior College.

McCuskey died of a heart attack, suffered while attending services at Peace Memorial Presbyterian Church in Clearwater, on June 15, 1997. He is buried at Barrancas National Cemetery at Naval Air Station Pensacola. The service for him included a naval aircraft flyover, an honor typically reserved for those who die while on active military duty but here given because he was one of the Navy's most highly decorated aviators.
