= Geauga Park District =

Park district in Geauga County, Ohio, US

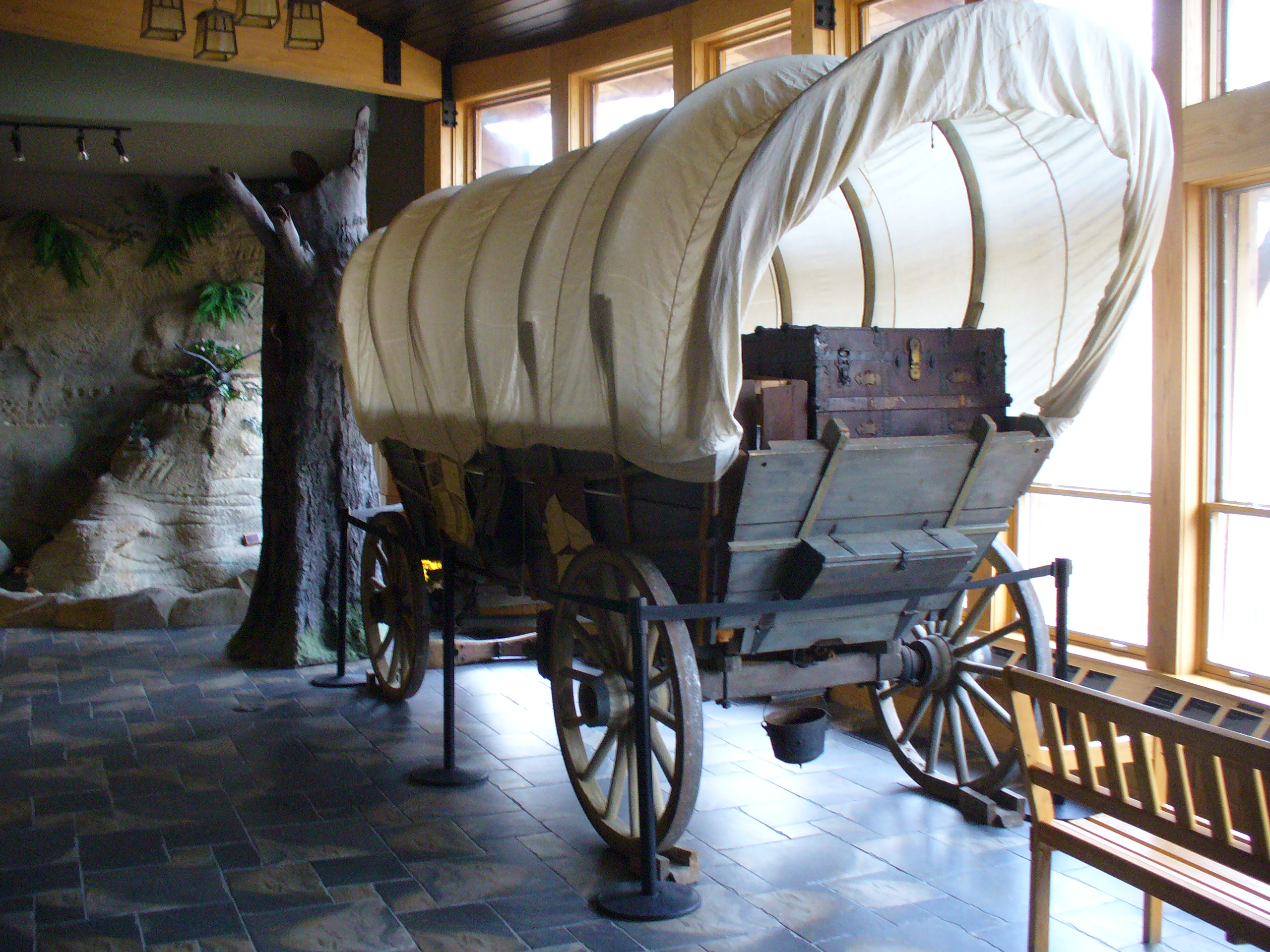
Bio-Centennial exhibit at the West Woods in Russell Township

The Geauga Park District, among the Ohio Metroparks, manages a system of nature preserves scattered throughout Geauga County, Ohio. The network of 22 open parks, as well as preserves and future parks, encompass more than 10,000 acres (40 km^{2}) and includes 60+ miles of walking, bicycle and horse trails, picnic areas, a nature center and abundant fishing holes.

The park district is operated by a three-member Board of Park Commissioners, each appointed to three-year terms by the Geauga County Probate Judge. According to Chapter 1545 of the O.R.C., the Board is empowered by state law to hire professionals to manage park property, acquire land, designate law enforcement officers, and levy taxes to fund its operations. To sell or lease land, the Board must gain approval of the Probate Judge. The Board must maintain accurate and permanent records of its proceedings and is subject to open records laws in Ohio.

== History ==
In 1959, Geauga County's League of Women Voters and several local garden clubs began to explore the creation of a park district modeled after neighboring Cleveland Metroparks in order to preserve natural areas and protect animal habitats in Geauga County. The Geauga Park District was established in August 1961 under authority of Ohio Revised Code Chapter 1545 http://codes.ohio.gov/orc/1545 by Geauga County Probate Judge Robert B. Ford. The first park operated was a 4-acre park on Woodin Road in Chardon Township.

The first employee of the district was Donald W. Meyer, who served as the agency's director from 1965 to his death in 1987. The district's administrative center at Big Creek Park in Chardon Township bears Mr. Meyer's name.

The park system has completed thousands of programs for the public and continues to offer educational and recreational programs both on-site and off-site. The park system's volunteer base and the expertise of its naturalist staff support these programs, which have become a longstanding part of the local community. Members of the community may reserve the lodges and shelters located throughout the parks for meetings, parties and family reunions. Big Creek Park, Chickagami Park, Headwaters Park and The West Woods offer year-round camping, including lean-to shelters and tent pads. Meeting rooms at the Meyer Center and The West Woods Nature Center are also available for use by local groups and organizations.

== Nature Centers ==
- The West Woods Nature Center is located in The West Woods.
- The Donald W. Meyer Center is located at Big Creek Park.
