= List of acronyms: H =

This list contains acronyms, initialisms, and pseudo-blends that begin with the letter H.

For the purposes of this list:

- acronym = an abbreviation pronounced as if it were a word, e.g., SARS = severe acute respiratory syndrome, pronounced to rhyme with cars
- initialism = an abbreviation pronounced wholly or partly using the names of its constituent letters, e.g., CD = compact disc, pronounced cee dee
- pseudo-blend = an abbreviation whose extra or omitted letters mean that it cannot stand as a true acronym, initialism, or portmanteau (a word formed by combining two or more words).

(a) = acronym, e.g.: SARS – (a) severe acute respiratory syndrome
(i) = initialism, e.g.: CD – (i) compact disc
(p) = pseudo-blend, e.g.: UNIFEM – (p) United Nations Development Fund for Women
(s) = symbol (none of the above, representing and pronounced as something else; for example: MHz – megahertz)

Some terms are spoken as either acronym or initialism, e.g., VoIP, pronounced both as voyp and V-O-I-P.

(Main list of acronyms)

- h – (s) Hecto
- H – (s) Henry – Hydrogen

== HA ==
- ha – (s) Hausa language (ISO 639-1 code) – Hectare
- HA – (s) Haiti (FIPS 10-4 country code) – (i) High Availability
- HAC - (a) Home Access Center
- HAARP – (a) High Frequency Active Auroral Research Program
- HAART – (a) Highly Active Anti-Retroviral Therapy
- HAI – (i) Human Awareness Institute
- HAL – (i) Hardware Abstraction Layer
- HALO –
  - (a) Habitation and Logistics Outpost (of the planned Lunar Gateway space station)
  - High Altitude Low Opening (parachute jump)
- HALT
  - (a) Highly Accelerated Life Test
  - (a) Hungry Angry Lonely Tired
- HAMR – (a) Heat-assisted magnetic recording
- HAN - (s) IATA code for Noi Bai International Airport
- HANS – (a) Head And Neck Support (device used in many race cars)
- HARM – (a) High-speed Anti-Radiation Missile
- hat – (s) Haitian Creole language (ISO 639-2 code)
- HAT – (i/a) Highest Astronomical Tide (nautical charts) – (a) Hungarian Automated Telescope
- hau – (s) Hausa language (ISO 639-2 code)
- HAW – (i) Heavy Antitank Weapon
- HAWK – (a) Homing All the Way Killer (air defence system)
- HAZ – (i) Heat-Affected Zone
- HAZMAT – (p) Hazardous Materials

== HB ==
- HBCD – (p) HexaBromoCycloDodecane
- HBCI – (i) Home Banking Computer Interface
- HBCU – (i) Historically black colleges and universities (U.S.)
- HBO – (i) Home Box Office
- HBR – (i) Harvard Business Review
- HBT – (i) Heterojunction Bipolar Transistor
- HBV – (i) Hepatitis B Virus

== HC ==
- h.c. – (i) honoris causa (Latin, "for the sake of honor")
- HCAL — (p) Homogeneous calorimeter
- HCCI – (i) Homogeneous Charge Compression Ignition
- HCF – (i) Highest Common Factor
- HCI – (i) Human–Computer Interaction/Interface
- HCPCS – (i) Health Care Procedure Coding System
- HCSC – (i) Higher Command and Staff Course
- HCT – (i) Higher Colleges of Technology, tertiary education institution in the United Arab Emirates (UAE)

== HD ==
- HD
  - (i) Henry Draper (star catalogue)
  - Hull-Down (armored vehicle target, as opposed to Fully Exposed)
  - High Definition
  - Huntington's Disease
- HDD
  - (i) Hard Disk Drive
  - High-Density Disk
- HDL – (i) High-Density Lipoprotein
- HDM – (i) Human Decision-Making
- HDMI – High-Definition Multimedia Interface
- HDR
  - (i) Hard disk recorder
  - Henningson, Durham & Richardson (founders of the engineering and construction firm now known by their initials)
  - High dynamic range, a term used in both digital imaging and 3D rendering
  - Hot Dry Rock (experimental geothermal technology)
  - Human Development Report (UN publication)
- HDRA – (i) Henry Doubleday Research Association
- HDTV – (p) High-definition television

== HE ==
- he – (s) Hebrew language (ISO 639-1 code)
- He – (s) Helium
- HE – (a) High Explosive
- HEAT – (a) High-Explosive Anti-Tank (ammunition)
- heb – (s) Hebrew language (ISO 639-2 code)
- HEBA – (p) Hellenic Basketball Clubs Association
- HEER – (a) High-Explosive Extended Range (ammunition)
- HEIC – (i) Honourable East India Company
- HELOC – (a) Home equity line of credit
- HEMP – (a) High-Altitude Electromagnetic Pulse
- HEO
  - (a) High Earth orbit
  - (a) Highly elliptical orbit
- HEOSS – (a) High Earth Orbit Space Surveillance
- HEP – (i) High-Explosive Plastic (ammunition)
- HEPA – (a/i) High-Efficiency Particulate Air (filter)
- her – (s) Herero language (ISO 639-2 code)
- HESH – (a) High-Explosive, Squash-Head (ammunition)
- HESV – (i) Heavy Engineering Support Vehicle
- HETT – (a) Heavy Equipment Transporting Truck / Heavy Equipment Truck Tractor
- HEU – (i) Highly Enriched Uranium
- HEV
  - Hybrid Electric Vehicle (non-rechargeable)
  - Hazadous EnVironment suit - outfit worn by Half-Life protagonist Gordon Freeman
- Hewitts – (a) Hills in England, Wales and Ireland over Two Thousand feet (with topographic prominence of at least 30 m)

== HF ==
- Hf – (s) Hafnium
- HF – (i) High Frequency
- HFAC – (p) Human Factors ("aytchfak")
- HFE – (i) Human Fertilisation and Embryology (UK Act)
- HFE – (s) The common-emitter current gain in a BJT transistor (also represented by βF). See: BJT
- HFEA – (i) Human Fertilisation and Embryology Authority (UK)

== HG ==
- Hg – (i) Mercury (Latin Hydrargyrum)
- HGC – (i) UK Human Genetics Commission
- HGF – (i) Human Growth Factor
- HGTV – (i) Home & Garden Television

== HH ==
- HHD – (p) humanitatum doctor (Latin, "doctor of humanities")
- HHB – Ha Ha Bonk – The noise made when you laugh your head off. Used instead of LOL...
- HHS – (i) (U.S. Department of) Health and Human Services

== HI ==
- hi – (s) Hindi language (ISO 639-1 code)
- HI – (s) Hawaii (postal symbol)
- HIC – Hierarchical Ingredient Code, a system of classifying drug ingredients
- HIDACZ – (p) High-Density Airspace Control Zone ("high dak zed/zee")
- HIH – (i) His (or Her) Imperial Highness
- HIIT - (a) High-Intensity Interval Training
- HIM – (i) His (or Her) Imperial Majesty
- HIMAD – (p) High to Medium Altitude Air Defence (see also H/MAD)
- HIMARS - (a) HIgh Mobility Artillery Rocket System
- HIMEZ – (a) High Altitude Missile Engagement Zone
- HIMYM – How I Met Your Mother
- hin – (s) Hindi language (ISO 639-2 code)
- HIPAA – (i) U.S. Health Insurance Portability and Accountability Act
- Hipparcos – (p) HIgh Precision Parallax COllecting Satellite
- Hird – (a) Hurd of interfaces representing depth (cf. HURD)
- HiRISE – (p) High Resolution Imaging Science Experiment
- HIT – (a) Health Information Technology
- HIV – (i) Human Immunodeficiency Virus
- HIWT – (i) Hobart Institute of Welding Technology

== HJ ==
- HJ – (i) hic jacet (Latin, "here lies")
- HJD – (i) Heliocentric Julian Day

== HK ==
- HK – (s) Hong Kong (ISO 3166 digram; FIPS 10-4 territory code)
- HKD – (s) Hong Kong dollar (ISO 4217 currency code)
- HKG –
  - (s) Hong Kong (ISO 3166 trigram)
  - Hong Kong International Airport (IATA code)
- HKMAO – (i) Hong Kong and Macau Affairs Office
- HKO – (i) Hong Kong Observatory
- HKS – (i) HyperKinetic Syndrome
- HKSAR – (i) Hong Kong Special Administrative Region of the People's Republic of China

== HL ==
- hL – (s) Hectolitre
- HL
  - (i) Holding Line
  - (i) Half-Life
- HLA – (i) High Level Architecture (simulation) – Human Leukocyte Antigen
- HLL – (i) High-Level Language
- HLN – (i) Headline News
- HLOS – (i) High Level Output Specification
- HLS – (i) hoc loco situs (Latin, "laid in this place")
- HLVW – (i) Heavy Logistics Vehicle, Wheeled

== HM ==
- HM
  - (s) Heard Island and McDonald Islands (ISO 3166 digram; FIPS 10-4 territory code)
  - (i) His Majesty / Her Majesty (title for certain monarchs)
  - (i) Hatsune Miku
- H/MAD – (p) High/Medium Altitude Air Defence ("aytchmad"; see also HIMAD)
- HMCE – (i) Her/His Majesty's Customs and Excise (former UK government department; succeeded by HM Revenue and Customs)
- HMCS
  - (i) Her/His Majesty's Canadian Ship
  - Her Majesty's Courts Service (former UK agency; succeeded by Her Majesty's Courts and Tribunals Service)
- HMD
  - (s) Heard and McDonald Islands (ISO 3166 trigram)
  - (i) Helmet-Mounted Display
- HMF – (p) HydroxyMethyl Furfural
- HMICFRS - (i) His/Her Majesty's Inspectorate of Constabularies and of Fire and Rescue Services (UK Government agency)
- HMM – (i) Hidden Markov model
- HMMWV – (i) High Mobility Multipurpose Wheeled Vehicle ("hum-vee"; "hummer")
- hmo – (s) Hiri Motu language (ISO 639-2 code)
- HMO – (i) Health maintenance organization
- HMO – (i) House in multiple occupation
- HMO – (i) Human milk oligosaccharide
- HMP – (i) Her Majesty's Prison
- HMRC – (i) Her/His Majesty's Revenue and Customs
- HMS - (i) Her/His Majesty's Ship (Royal Navy)
- HMSO – (i) Her Majesty's Stationery Office
- HMV – (i) His Master's Voice (disambiguation)

== HN ==
- HN – (s) Honduras (ISO 3166 digram)
- HND
  - (s) Honduras (ISO 3166 trigram)
  - Tokyo Haneda Airport (IATA code)
- HNL
  - (s) Honduran lempira (ISO 4217 currency code)
  - Daniel K. Inouye International Airport (IATA code)

== HO ==
- ho – (s) Hiri Motu language (ISO 639-1 code)
- Ho – (s) Holmium
- HO – (s) Honduras (FIPS 10-4 country code)
- HOLLAND – (a) Hope Our Love Lasts And Never Dies
- HOMES – the Great Lakes; Huron, Ontario, Michigan, Erie, Superior
- HONY – Humans of New York, a photoblog.
- HOPI – (a) Hybrid Optical and Packet Infrastructure (see Internet2, Abilene Network)
- HoReCa – (a) Hotel, Restaurant and Catering
- HORIZON – (p) Hélicoptère d'observation radar et d'investigation sur zone (French, Zone Investigation and Radar Observation Helicopter)
- HOSTAC – (a) Helicopter Operations from Ships Other Than Aircraft Carriers
- HOT – (a) Highly Optimised Tolerance
- HOTAS – (a) Hands on throttle-and-stick
- HOTT or HotT – (i) Hordes of the Things (miniature fantasy wargaming rules; a play on The Lord of the Rings)
- HOV – (i) High Occupancy Vehicle

== HP ==
- hp – (s) horse power
- HP –
  - (i) Hewlett-Packard
  - Hindustan Petroleum
  - (s) Himachal Pradesh (Indian state code)
- HPA – (i) UK Health Protection Agency
- HPCL – (i) Hindustan Petroleum Corporation Limited
- HPGL or HP-GL – (i) Hewlett-Packard Graphics Language
- HPH - (s) IATA code for Cat Bi International Airport
- HP-IB – (i) Hewlett-Packard Instrument/Interface Bus (first implementation of GP-IB, later standardised and now known as IEEE-488)
- HP-IL – (i) Hewlett-Packard Interface Loop (serial bus used with some HP calculators and computers, notably the HP-41 and HP-71 series)
- HPLC – (i) High Performance Liquid Chromatography
- HPMOR – (i) Harry Potter and the Methods of Rationality (work of Harry Potter fan fiction)
- HPT – (i) High[er] Payoff Target
- HPV – (i) Human Papilloma Virus

== HQ ==
- HQ –
  - (i) Headquarters
  - (s) Howland Island (FIPS 10-4 territory code)
- HQ – (i) High Quality
- HQDA – (i) Headquarters, Department of the Army

== HR ==
- hr – (s) Croatian language (ISO 639-1 code)
- HR
  - (s) Croatia (FIPS 10-4 country code; ISO 3166 digram – from the country's native name of Hrvatska)
  - (s) Haryana (Indian state code)
  - (i) Harvard Revised star catalogue
  - Human Resources
- HRBL – (i) High-level Representation of Behavior Language (original name of the Herbal language)
- HRD – (i) Human Resource Development
- HRED – (i) (U.S. Army Research Laboratory's) Human Research and Engineering Directorate (Aberdeen Proving Ground, Maryland)
- HRF – (i) High Readiness Forces
- HRH – (i) His (or Her) Royal Highness
- HRK – (s) Croatian kuna (ISO 4217 currency code)
- HRM – (i) His (or Her) Royal Majesty
- HRM – (i) Human Resource Management
- HRT – (i) Hormone Replacement Therapy
- hrv – (s) Croatian language (ISO 639-2 code)
- HRV
  - (s) Croatia (ISO 3166 trigram)
  - (i) High Resolution Visible

== HS ==
- Hs – (s) Hassium
- HSA – A health savings account available to taxpayers in the United States.
- HSBC – (i) The Hong Kong and Shanghai Banking Corporation
- HSC
  - (i) Higher School Certificate
  - (i) Helicopter Sea Combat, a type of U.S Navy aviation squadron
- HSM – (i) High School Musical
- HSMAD – (i) Human Science/Modeling and Analysis Data
- HSN – (i) Home Shopping Network
- HSPH – (i) Harvard School of Public Health
- HSS
  - (i) Health Service Support
  - (i) High-Speed Steel
- HSSI – (i) High-Speed Serial Interface
- HST – see entry
- HSV
  - (i) Herpes Simplex Virus
  - Hue Saturation Value (colour model)

== HT ==
- ht – (s) Haitian Creole language (ISO 639-1 code)
- HT
  - (s) Haiti (ISO 3166 digram)
  - (i) High Temperature
  - hoc tempore (Latin, "at this time")
  - hoc titulo (Latin, "under this title")
- HTA – (i) HyperText Application
- HTC
  - High Tech Computer Corporation, original name of the company now known simply as HTC
- HTFU – (a) Harden The F**k Up
- HTG – (s) Haitian gourde (ISO 4217 currency code)
- HTH – (a) Hope That Helps
- HTI – (s) Haiti (ISO 3166 trigram)
- HTML – (i) HyperText Markup Language
- HTS – (i) High-Temperature Superconducting wire
- HTTP – (i) HyperText Transfer Protocol

== HU ==
- hu- (s) Hungarian language (ISO 639-1 code)
- HU – (s) Hungary (ISO 3166 digram; FIPS 10-4 country code)
- HUD – (i/a) Head-Up Display – Housing and Urban Development
- HUF – (s) Hungarian forint (ISO 4217 currency code)
- HUHA – (a) Head up his/her ass (Marine salute; probably a backcronym)
- HUI - (s) IATA code for Hue's Phu Bai International Airport
- HUMINT – (p) Human Intelligence (military parlance)
- Hum-Vee – See HMMWV
- hun – (s) Hungarian language (ISO 639-2 code)
- HUN – (s) Hungary (ISO 3166 trigram)
- HURD – (a) Hird of Unix-Replacing Daemons (cf. Hird)
- HVU – (i) High Value Unit (military)

== HV ==
- HV – (s) Upper Volta (ISO 3166 digram; obsolete 1984)
- HVAC – (s) Heating, ventilation and air conditioning Used in architecture, business and marketing; refers to a building's entire system of heating, moving, or cooling air.
- HVAP – (i) High Velocity Armour Piercing (ammunition)
- HVHF – (i)High velocity human factors
- HVI - (i) High Value Individual
- HVM – (i) High Velocity Missile
- HVO – (s) Upper Volta (ISO 3166 trigram; obsolete 1984)
- HVP –
  - (i) HarborView Properties
  - High vacuum process
  - Hydrolyzed vegetable protein
  - High Velocity Protection
  - H.V.P. (rapper)
  - High Voltage Protection
  - High Vapor Pressure
  - High-Velocity Projectile
  - High-Video Pass
  - High-Velocity Particle
  - Hub Voice Processor
  - Human Variome Project
- HVT - (i) High-Value Target (US military terminology)

== HW ==
- HW – (p) Hardware – (i) High Water (nautical charts)
- HWM – (i) Hardware morphing (computer graphics rendering)

== HX ==
- HX –
  - (s) IATA code of Hong Kong Airlines
  - (s) Medical history
  - (s) Hydrogen halide
  - (s) Concept automobile by HUMMER
- HXB – (s) The glycoprotein Tenascian C

== HY ==
- hy – (s) Armenian language (ISO 639-1 code)
- hye – (s) Armenian language (ISO 639-2 code)
- HYP
  - (i) Halkın Yükselişi Partisi (Turkish: "People's Ascent Party"), a political party in Turkey
  - Harvard, Yale, Princeton (perennially at or near the top of American university rankings)
- HYS – (i) Harvard, Yale, Stanford (perennially named as the top three law schools in the U.S.)

== HZ ==
- hz – (s) Herero language (ISO 639-1 code)
- Hz – (s) Hertz
- HZ – (s) Haze (METAR Code)
