= H&M (disambiguation) =

H&M is a Swedish multinational retail-clothing company.

H&M may also refer to:

- Harold and Maude, a film
- Hartley & Marks Publishers, a Canadian publishing firm
- Howard and Moore Complete Checklist of the Birds of the World, an ornithological checklist
- Hudson & Manhattan Railroad, now operated as PATH (rail system)

== See also ==
- HM (disambiguation)
- High and Mighty (disambiguation)
