= HTH =

HTH may refer to:

== Transportation ==
- Handforth railway station, England, station code
- Hawthorne Industrial Airport, Nevada, US, IATA and FAA LID code
- Helitt Líneas Aéreas, a Spanish charter airline, ICAO code
- Heworth Interchange, Tyne and Wear Metro, England, station code

== Science and technology ==
- Helix-turn-helix, a protein structural motif
- Homothorax, an arthropod gene

== Other uses ==
- Hand-to-hand combat
- High Tech High (disambiguation)
- House to House Heart to Heart, an American Christian magazine
