= HRM =

HRM may refer to:

- Ḥ-R-M, a Semitic root
- Croatian Navy (Croatian: Hrvatska ratna mornarica)
- Halifax Regional Municipality, Nova Scotia, Canada
- Harrietsham railway station, England, station code
- Hassi R'Mel Airport, Algeria, IATA code
- Heart rate monitor
- Heart Rhythm Meditation
- Hermes Airlines, a Greek airline, ICAO code
- High-reactivity metakaolin, used in cement
- High resolution manometry, a medical diagnostic system
- High Resolution Melt, in molecular biology
- His or Her Royal Majesty
- Horned Miao language, spoken in China, ISO 639-3 code hrm
- Horsham railway station, Victoria, Australia, station code
- HRM, a Rockwell scale of materials' hardness
- Human Race Machine, a computerized console
- Human resource management
