= HHD =

HHD may refer to:

== Biology and medicine ==
- ATP2C1, a human enzyme
- Hailey–Hailey disease, a genetic disorder
- Hiatus hernia diafragmatica, a medical condition
- Home hemodialysis, for treating kidney failure

== Other ==
- Astro Hua Hee Dai, a Malaysian television channel
- Hao Haidong (born 1970), Chinese footballer
- Headquarters and Headquarters Detachment in the United States Army
- Helena Historic District (disambiguation), various places in the United States
- High Holy Days (band), a Canadian rock band
- Hogshead (abbreviation: hhd), a barrel of liquid
- Holyhead railway station, in Wales
- Hybrid hard drive, a type of hard disk drive
