= HC =

HC, hc or H/C may refer to:

== Science, technology, and mathematics ==
=== Medicine ===
- Health Canada
- Hemicrania continua
- Hyperelastosis cutis or hereditary equine regional dermal asthenia

=== Chemistry ===
- Hemocyanin, a metalloprotein abbreviated Hc
- HC smoke, a US military designation for Hexachloroethane
- Homocapsaicin, a capsaicinoid
- Hydrocarbon, a category of substances consisting only of hydrogen and carbon

=== Other uses in science, technology, and mathematics ===
- 74HC-series integrated circuits, a logic family of integrated circuits
- Felix HC, a series of Romanian personal microcomputers produced by ICE Felix Bucharest and which were ZX Spectrum clones
- Hemianthus callitrichoides, a freshwater aquatic plant native to Cuba
- + h.c., a notation used in mathematics and quantum physics

== Sports ==
- Head Coach
- Hors catégorie (French), used in cycle races to designate a climb that is "beyond categorization"
- UCI .HC road cycling races (1.HC and 2.HC), the second tier of events in the sport, after the UCI World Tour

== Other uses ==
- Heritage Corridor, a Metra commuter rail line running from Chicago to Joliet, Illinois
- Highway contract route, an outsourced United States Postal Service delivery method, formerly known as Star routes
- Honorary degree, or honoris causa
- Hors de commerce, prints similar to Artist Proofs except they are only available through the artist directly
- Hospitality Club, an internet-based hospitality service
- Houston Chronicle, newspaper of record of Houston, Texas
- Aero-Tropics Air Services (IATA airline designator HC)
- Disability, acronym for Handicap/Handicapped
- High-cube container, a type of intermodal shipping container
