= HR =

HR, H.R., Hr or hr may refer to:

== Arts and media ==
=== Film and television ===
- H.R. Pufnstuf, a children's television series from 1969
- HR, a 2013 television drama starring Alicia Silverstone
- HR, a criminal organization in the American TV series Person of Interest

=== Other media ===
- HR (girl group), Japan
- Hessischer Rundfunk (Hessian Broadcasting), Germany
- Homestar Runner, a 2000 flash cartoon made by The Brothers Chaps

=== Fictional characters ===
- H. R. Wells, a character from The Flash television series

== Business and finance ==
- Human resources, personnel
- Human resource management
- Ukrainian hryvnia, currency

== Government and politics ==
- High Representative of the Union for Foreign Affairs and Security Policy of the European Union
- United States House of Representatives

== Languages ==
- hr (ISO 639-1 code) for the Croatian language
- ⟨hr⟩, a two-letter combination used in some languages
  - Reduction of /hr/ to /r/ in Old/Middle English

== People ==
- H.R. (musician) (born 1956), lead singer of American band Bad Brains

== Places ==
- Hellenic Republic, the official name of Greece
- HR (ISO 3166-1 code) for Croatia
- HR postcode area, UK, covering six post towns around Hereford, England
- IN-HR (ISO 3166 code) for Haryana, a state in North India

== Religion ==
- HR, an honorific abbreviating His Reverence or Her Reverence

== Science and technology ==
=== Biology and medicine ===
- HR (gene), encoding protein hairless
- Haemodynamic response, delivery of blood to tissues
- Heart rate
- Homologous recombination, in genetics
- Hypersensitive response, of plants to infection
- Hydroxyethylrutoside, a class of drugs

=== Computing ===
- <hr>, HTML element for a horizontal rule or thematic break
- .hr, Internet code for Croatia
- HR (software), mathematical theory generator
- Half Rate (HR or GSM-HR), a speech coding system

=== Other uses in science and technology ===
- Hazard ratio
- Hertzsprung–Russell diagram (H-R, HRD), in astronomy and astrophysics
- Hour (hr)
- HR, Bright Star Catalogue prefix
- Nissan HR engine
- High-reflective coating

== Sports ==
- Home run in baseball

== Transportation ==
- Former Scots Highland Railway
- Holden HR, a car 1966-1968
- Haryana Roadways State Transport, India

== See also ==
- RH (disambiguation)
