= The High and the Mighty =

The High and the Mighty may refer to:

- The High and the Mighty (novel), a novel by Ernest K. Gann
  - The High and the Mighty (film), a film based on the novel
    - "The High and the Mighty" (1954 song), a song from the film

== Music ==
- The High and the Mighty (album), an album by Donnie Iris
  - "The High and the Mighty" (Donnie Iris song), a song from the album
- The High & Mighty, a Philadelphia hip-hop group
- The High and the Mighty (1958 album), an album by Lionel Hampton

== Television ==
- "The High and the Mighty", 1st & Ten (1984) season 4, episode 13 (1988)
- "The High and the Mighty", Fault Lines season 2, episode 21 (2010)
- "The High and the Mighty", Flamingo Road season 2, episode 18 (1982)
- "The High and the Mighty: Part 1" and "The High and the Mighty: Part 2", On the Rocks (American) episodes 12–13 (1975)
- "The High and the Mighty", Spin City season 1, episode 8 (1996)

== See also ==
- High and Mighty (disambiguation)
- The High and the Flighty, a 1956 Merrie Melodies cartoon
