= High definition =

High definition or HD may refer to:

== Visual technologies ==
- Blu-ray Disc, the universal optical High Definition disc format
- HD Photo, former name for the JPEG XR image file format
- HDV, format for recording high-definition video onto magnetic tape
- HiDef, 24 frames-per-second digital video format
- High-Definition Multimedia Interface (HDMI), all-digital audio/video interface capable of transmitting uncompressed streams
- High-definition television (HDTV), television signals and apparatus with higher resolution than their contemporary counterparts
  - Ultra-high-definition television, a further step in television resolution, but not a successor.
- High-definition video, used in HD broadcasting, digital film, computer HD video file formats, and video games

== Audio technologies ==
- Dolby TrueHD, lossless audio compression codec
- DTS-HD Master Audio, lossless audio compression codec
- High Definition Compatible Digital, discontinued digital audio optical disc format
- High-definition audio, general marketing term for high fidelity audio products and services
- Intel High Definition Audio, 2004 Intel specification for hardware and associated drivers for Personal computer audio
- Wideband audio, also known as HD voice, is high definition voice quality for telephony audio

== Music ==
- "Hi-Definition", 2008 single from Lupe Fiasco's The Cool
- High Definition (Joe Morris album), 2008
- High Definition (Shootyz Groove album), 1999
- "High Definition", a single from Waterparks' 2019 album, Fandom

== Other ==
- High Definition (radio program), 2006 Canadian radio program
- High-definition map, used in autonomous driving
