= HW =

HW or Hw may refer to:

== Transportation ==
- Haridwar Railway Station, Haridwar, India, station code
- Hello (airline), IATA airline designator
- North-Wright Airways, IATA airline designator

== Other uses ==
- George H. W. Bush (1924–2018), 41st President of the United States
- Harland & Wolff
- Hartford Whalers, US ice hockey team
- Hot Wheels, toy cars
- Hantzsche–Wendt manifold
- hectowatt (hW) metric unit of power, 1 hW = 100 watt
- Hwair (ƕ), a Gothic letter
- Voiceless labialized velar approximant /ʍ/, often transcribed /hw/
- Homework, tasks assigned to students to be completed out of class
- Hydraulic warfare

== See also ==
- WH (disambiguation)
