= HSC =

HSC may stand for:

== Business ==
- Hughes Systique Corporation
- Halifax Shopping Centre
- Harmonized System Code
- Harsco Corporation

== Computing ==
- HSC50 (Hierarchical Storage Controller), using DEC Mass Storage Control Protocol
- Hughes Systique Corporation

== Medicine ==
- Health and Social Care in Northern Ireland
- Hematopoietic stem cell
- Hepatic stellate cell
- Hospital for Sick Children, Toronto, Canada
- Hydraulic Sinus Condensing, a technique used in dentistry to lift the sinus
- Hysteroscopy, a method for looking into the uterus via the cervix

== Organizations ==
- Harare Sports Club, sports venue in Zimbabwe
- Health Service Commissioner for England
- Health Sponsorship Council
- Heraldry Society of Canada
- Huntington Society of Canada
- Health and Safety Commission
- Horizon Scanning Centre (HSC)
- United States Homeland Security Council

== Schooling ==
=== Certificates ===
- Higher School Certificate (New South Wales), Australia
- Higher School Certificate (Victoria), Australia
- Higher School Certificate (UK)
- Higher Secondary Certificate (South Asian countries)

=== Schools ===
- Hampden–Sydney College
- Hillfield Strathallan College, private school in Hamilton, Ontario, Canada
- Hsin Sheng College of Medical Care and Management, private junior college in Taoyuan City, Taiwan

=== Related ===
- Hindu Students Council

== Other ==
- High-speed craft
- Houston Ship Channel
- Hyper Suprime-Cam, camera for Subaru Telescope
- Mauser HSc, pistol
- Shaoguan Guitou Airport, IATA code
