= HMCS =

HMCS may refer to:

- Her Majesty's Courts Service (2005-11)
- His Majesty's Canadian Ship
- His Majesty's Colonial Ship, see His Majesty's Ship
- Senior Chief Hospital Corpsman, a United States Navy rate
- Hazardous Material Control System (see Workplace Hazardous Materials Information System)
- HMC Investment Securities
- Molybdenum cofactor sulfurtransferase, an enzyme
- High-maltose corn syrup
