= HBV =

HBV may refer to:

- Buskerud and Vestfold University College (Norwegian: Høgskolen i Buskerud og Vestfold)
- Hamengkubuwono V, 19th-century ruler of Yogyakarta, Java
- Handbuch der Vögel Mitteleuropas (Handbook of the Birds of Central Europe)
- HBV hydrology model
- Hepatitis B virus
- Hepatitis B vaccine
- Heterostructure barrier varactor
- Trade, Banking and Insurance Union, a former German trade union
