= HLS =

HLS may refer to:

== Organisations ==
- Harlington Locomotive Society, London, England
- Huntingdon Life Sciences, a British contract research organisation
- HLS Ost, a German WWII cryptanalysis station

=== Education ===
- Harvard Law School, Cambridge, Massachusetts, US
- Helen Lowry Higher Secondary School, Mizoram, India
- Highlands Latin School, Louisville, Kentucky, US

== Technology ==
- HTTP Live Streaming, a media streaming communications protocol
- HLS color space, a representation of points in an RGB color model
- High-level synthesis, an automated design process

== Transportation ==
- Human Landing System, a NASA program to choose a Moon landing system for the 2020s
  - Starship HLS, a modified version of the SpaceX Starship
- Heavy Logistics System, a USAF program which developed the Lockheed C-5 Galaxy aircraft
- Haiti Air Freight (ICAO airline code HLS); a defunct Haitian airline
- St Helens Airport (IATA airport code HLS), Tasmania, Australia
- Hilsea railway station (station code HLS), England, UK

== Other uses ==
- The Historical Dictionary of Switzerland (German: Historisches Lexikon der Schweiz)
- UNDP country code for the Holy See (Vatican City)
- Himalayan Languages Symposium, an annual academic conference

== See also ==
- Health sciences
- Life sciences
- HL (disambiguation)
- HIS (disambiguation)
