= HVO =

HVO may refer to:

== Organizations ==
- Croatian Defence Council (Croatian: Hrvatsko vijeće obrane), the main military force of Croats of Bosnia and Herzegovina during the Bosnian War
- Hawaiian Volcano Observatory
- Health Volunteers Overseas, an American nonprofit organization
- Hidden Valley Observatory, in South Dakota, United States
- Hindu Volunteers' Organisation

== Sports ==
- HC Vítkovice Ostrava, an ice hockey club in Ostrava, Czech Republic
- Heritage Village Open, a former LPGA golf tournament
- Hermes Volley Oostende, a volleyball team in Oostende, Belgium

== Other uses ==
- Hydrotreated vegetable oil, biofuel made by hydrogenating vegetable or animal fat
- Volda University College (Norwegian: Høgskulen i Volda)
