= HCT =

HCT may refer to:

== Colleges ==
- Hadassah College of Technology, now Hadassah Academic College in Jerusalem, Israel
- Higher College of Technology, in Muscat, Oman
- Higher Colleges of Technology, in the United Arab Emirates
- Herefordshire College of Technology, now Herefordshire and Ludlow College, in England

== Health and medicine ==
- Healthcare technician
- Hematocrit
- Hydrochlorothiazide
- Hematopoietic cell transplantation

== Organisations ==
- Herpetological Conservation Trust
- Hertfordshire Community NHS Trust

== Places ==
- Huncoat railway station, in England

== Other uses ==
- Hardware Compatibility Test
- HCT Co., Ltd. a South Korean compliance testing and calibration company
- HCT Group, a bus operator in London
- HCMOS, HCT is a variation of HCMOS integrated circuit logic
  - 74HCT-series integrated circuits, a logic family of integrated circuits
- High Capacity Transport or High Capacity Truck - generic term for Road Train and Longer Heavier Vehicles
- Hoog Comité van Toezicht (HCT) in Belgium
- hue, color, tone as an alias for HCL color space
