= HQ =

HQ may refer to:

- Headquarters
- High Quality (disambiguation)

== Games ==
- HQ (video game), a live trivia game app
- HeroQuest (role-playing game)
- Chase H.Q., an arcade racing game

== Businesses and utilities ==
- HQ an imprint of HarperCollins
- HQ Bank, a Swedish investment bank
- Home Quarters Warehouse, a defunct retail chain
- Harmony Airways' IATA airline designator
- Thomas Cook Airlines Belgium's defunct IATA airline code

== Other uses ==
- HAVE QUICK, a frequency-hopping system used to protect military UHF radio traffic
- Geely HQ (Haoqing), a car model
- Holden HQ, a range of car models
- Twickenham Stadium or HQ, a rugby union stadium in London, England
- Howland Island's FIPS PUB 10-4 territory code
