= Jörg Kühn =

Swiss naturalist and scientific illustrator

- Born: January 1, 1940; Wettingen, Canton of Aargau, Switzerland
- Died: October 18, 1964 (aged 24); Zürich, Switzerland
- Known for: Painting, bird portraiture, graphic artist, scientific illustration
- Notable work: Der Wald Und Seine Tierre,Handbuch der Vogel Mitteleuropas

Jörg Kühn (1940–1964) was a Swiss artist, naturalist and scientific illustrator who specialized in bird paintings and drawings. He was also a children's book illustrator. He is noted for illustrations that are of a particularly scientific and exact nature.

== Biography ==
Kühn's reputation as a master of the exact portrayal of animals is based on a professional career that lasted barely six years during which he worked prolifically. The legacy is regarded as very valuable containing in excess of one hundred colour plates and several hundred line drawings and innumerable field studies of the animals he was illustrating. His depictive style has echoes of Louis Agassiz Fuertes

He worked from 1961 to 1964 as a scientific illustrator at the Zoological Museum (Zoologische Museum der Universitat Zürich). His work which appeared in scientific publications including Pro Natura, Pro Juventute, World Wildlife Fund, and Hallwag-Verlag are exact and beautifully drawn. He was also skilled in graphics and taught the skill at the Zoological Museum in Zürich.

As well as scientific publications, he was sometimes employed as an illustrator of books including the children's book Der Wald Und Seine Tierre (The Forest and its Animals) (1963) where his illustrations included monographs of forest animals. It has run to at least five editions since it was first published in 1963.His colour plates include those of threatened wildlife that were commissioned by the World Wildlife Fund and contributions to the Handbuch der Vögel Mitteleuropas (Handbook of the Birds of Central Europe).

Although Jörg Kühn's is chiefly remembered as a wildlife illustrator he was also commissioned to illustrate a number of medical textbooks including for the Surgery of the Thyroid and Parathyroid Glands

Kühn died in Zürich in October 1964 aged 24 from Hodgkin's lymphoma diagnosed when he was 18 years of age.

== Selected solo exhibitions ==
- 2009 Landshut Utrenstorf Castle, Zürich – fifty works were shown

== See also ==
- List of wildlife artists
