= HSS =

HSS may refer to:

== Organizations ==
- Croatian Chess Federation (Croatian: Hrvatski šahovski savez, HŠS)
- Croatian Peasant Party (Croatian: Hrvatska seljačka stranka)
- Hampstead Scientific Society, UK
- Helsingfors Segelsällskap, a Finnish yacht club
- Hindu Swayamsevak Sangh, a cultural organisation in several countries
- History of Science Society
- Humanist Society Scotland
- Hungarian Skeptic Society
- HSS Hire, a British equipment and tool hire business
- Hospital for Special Surgery, New York City

=== Schools ===
- Henderson Secondary School, Singapore
- Humbergrove Secondary School, Toronto, Ontario, Canada
- High Storrs School, Sheffield, England

== Technology ==
- High-speed steel, a subset of tool steels
- Home Subscriber Server, a mobile subscriber database, part of the IMS framework
- Hollow structural section, a type of metal profile

== Other uses ==
- Humanities and Social Sciences (HSS)
- HSS Journal (Musculoskeletal Journal of Hospital for Special Surgery), a medical journal
- ERA HSS, a racing car
- Harsusi language (ISO 639-3 code), spoken in Oman
- Health systems strengthening, to improve the health care system of a country
- High-speed Sea Service, a former class of ferry
- Hisar Airport (IATA code), India
- HSS hypothesis, another name for the green world hypothesis
- High School Story, a game by Pixelberry

== See also ==
- Holy Spirit School (disambiguation)
