= HBO (disambiguation) =

HBO, or Home Box Office, is an American pay television network owned by Warner Bros. Discovery.

HBO or hbo may also refer to:

- Home Box Office, Inc., a division of Warner Bros. Discovery, which owns the brands of HBO and sister channel Cinemax

== HBO feeds ==
- HBO Asia, a suite of Southeast Asian premium networks owned by Warner Bros. Discovery through HBO Asia Pte Ltd.
- HBO Latin America Group, a subsidiary of Warner Bros. Discovery that oversees a suite of Latin American premium networks
- HBO Brasil, a suite of Brazilian pay television networks owned by Warner Bros. Discovery through HBO Latin America Group
- HBO (Canadian TV channel), a multiplex channel of Bell Media-owned Canadian pay television network Crave operating under brand and program licensing agreements with Warner Bros. Discovery
  - HBO Europe, a suite of pay television networks serving Central and Eastern Europe owned by Warner Bros. Discovery through Home Box Office, Inc.
- HBO Netherlands, a defunct Dutch premium television network owned by Home Box Office, Inc. and Ziggo, which operated from 2012 to 2016
- HBO Max, an American-based over-the-top streaming service offering content from HBO and other Warner Bros. Discovery properties
- HBO Go, a discontinued streaming service offering content from HBO to subscribers of the linear pay television channel
- HBO Now, a discontinued American based over-the-top streaming service offering content from HBO; formally referred to as "the HBO app" or as "the HBO streaming service" from August to December 2020

== Other uses ==
- Halo.Bungie.Org, a Halo fansite
- Hartung–Boothroyd Observatory, an observatory in Mount Pleasant, New York
- Hoger beroepsonderwijs, higher applied education institutes in Flanders and the Netherlands
- Hollywood Bowl Orchestra
- Hyperbaric oxygen
- Oxoborane
- HBO & Company, a company taken over by McKesson Corporation in 1999
- Biblical Hebrew language (ISO 639-3 code: hbo)

== See also ==
- Metaboric acid (HBO_{2}), a chemical compound
- HBOS, a British banking and insurance company
