= HEO =

HEO may refer to:

- Heo, a Korean surname
- Heo (pronoun), an Old English pronoun
- Haelogo Airport in Papua New Guinea, IATA code HEO
- Heng On station, in Hong Kong
- High entropy oxide, a class of chemical compounds
- Highly elliptical orbit, also called highly eccentric/elongated orbit, an orbit with greatly varying distance
- High Earth orbit, an orbit which is always far from Earth
- Health extension officer, a category of health care providers in some countries
- Higher Executive Officer, a grade within the United Kingdom's Civil Service
- Hockey Eastern Ontario, a Canadian governing body of ice hockey
- KK HEO, a Bosnian basketball club
- FK Hercegovac Bileća, nickname HEO, a football club in Republika Srpska of Bosnia and Herzegovina
