= HMF =

HMF may refer to:

- HandMade Films, a British film company
- Hannah Montana Forever (Hannah Montana season 4)
- His or Her Majesty's Frigate, a ship prefix; see Her Majesty's Ship
- Hmong Don language, spoken in Vietnam
- Human milk fortifier
- Hydroxymethylfurfural, an organic compound derived from dehydration of certain sugars
- Hypergol Maintenance Facility, at the Kennedy Space Center in Florida, United States
- Norrlandsflyg, a Swedish helicopter operator
