= Nancy Burson =

American artist (born 1948)

Nancy Burson (born 1948) is an American artist known for creating photographs using computer morphing technology, including the Age Machine, Human Race Machine and Anomaly Machine.

== Biography ==
Artist/photographer Nancy Burson's work is shown in museums and galleries internationally. "Seeing and Believing", her traveling 2002 retrospective originating at the Grey Art Gallery, was nominated for Best Solo Museum Show of the Year in New York City by the International Association of Art Critics. She has served as a visiting professor at Harvard and was a member of the adjunct photography faculty at New York University's Tisch School of the Arts for five years. Burson currently organizes the New York Film Academy Photo Guest Speaker Series and also teaches Portfolio Review.

Her work is included in museums worldwide including the MoMA, Metropolitan Museum, and the Whitney Museum in New York City, as well as the Victoria and Albert Museum in London, the Center Georges Pompidou in Paris, the LA County Museum of Art, MoMA (San Francisco), the Museum of Fine Arts in Houston, and the Smithsonian Museum in Washington DC, as well as many others.

Burson is best known for her work in morphing technologies which age enhance the human face and still enable law enforcement officials to locate missing children and adults. Her Human Race Machine, which allowed people to view themselves as a different race, was used worldwide as an educational diversity tool that provided viewers with the visual experience of being another race.

== The Human Race Machine ==
Burson’s invention, The Human Race Machine, was inspired by a meeting in mid-1998 with one of Zaha Hadid's staff. It made its debut at the Mind Zone in the London Millennium Dome on January 1, 2000 and it was seen by millions of people during that year. Set in the futuristic environment of Zaha’s Mind Zone, there were four machines and wait lines of sometimes two hours long to use the all new, race morphing technology that had been developed throughout 1999. The Human Race Machine was conceived as an interactive tool for the resolution of humanity’s racial issues. Several other interactive machines had already been developed in the late 1980s. These were based on commissions from science museums as well as concepts from the patent that was issued to Nancy Burson in 1981 called “The Method and Apparatus for Producing an Image of a Person’s Face at a Different Age.” A few years later, that patent became the basis for morphing technology for the entire computer graphics industry. A Composite Machine that showed the viewer what they might look like with their face melded with a celebrity had been developed by a science museum from that patent. An Age Machine showed viewers what they might look like when older and had been shown in art museums as early as 1990. That same technology had also been used to find children and adults that had been missing for many years. The software was acquired by the FBI and the National Center for Missing and Exploited Children. In 1986, several children were found and returned home using computer generated updates after national TV shows covered the updating process (Missing II, Have You Seen This Person, NBC Special, and Missing III, Have You Seen This Person, NBC Special).

== Collaboration ==
Burson has collaborated with Creative Time, the Lower Manhattan Cultural Council (LMCC), and Deutsche Bank in completing several public art projects in New York City. These include the poster project Visualize This (Creative Time, 1991), the billboard “There's No Gene For Race" (2000), the poster/postcard project "Focus on Peace" which coincided with the first anniversary of 9/11, and “Looking Up” and “Truth”, 2005.

Burson’s new TogetherAllOne concepts and designs promote the concept of global unity and encompass everything from interactive children’s books to projected lighting installations and original music videos. In 2014 her public artworks were displayed as videos and light projections at both the Berlin Festival of Light and the New York Festival of Light. She has also written two interactive children's iBooks: You Can Draw The Way You Feel, and You Can Draw Love. Both iBooks were published and produced by FlickerLab, NYC.

== An award-winning Short Documentary Film ==
In 2023, SRW Films produced an award-winning 13-minute short documentary called It’s Not Up To Us. The film won 15 film festival acceptances and 4 wins for Best Documentary Short. In it, Burson maintains the belief that forces beyond her self guide her work. The complex truth behind Nancy's beliefs and how they've shaped her career evokes questions about the nature of creation and of reality itself.

IMDB page link here: https://www.imdb.com/title/tt30008101/

Trailer: https://www.23rdletter.com/itsnotuptous

== Media Features and Publications ==
Burson's work has been featured in all forms of media including segments on Oprah (Skin Deep, 2/16/06), Good Morning America (1986, 2002), CNN (2002,1986,1983), National Public Radio (2002), PBS (2001, 1987), and Fuji TV News (2002). Articles featuring her work have appeared in The New York Times (March 15, April 14, 2002), The Washington Post (2005), The Houston Chronicle (2002), and Scientific American (December, 2003). In July, 2018, Time Magazine used Burson's Trump/Putin composite as their cover. There are five monographs of her work and reproductions of it appear in hundreds of art catalogs worldwide. Burson is one of five artists that art historian Patrick Frank examines in his 2024 book Art of the 1980s: As If the Digital Mattered published by Walter de Gruyter GmbH, Berlin/Boston.
