= Handbuch der Vögel Mitteleuropas =

- Author: Edited by Kurt M. Bauer and Urs N. Glutz von Blotzheim
- Language: German
- Publisher: Akademische Verlagsgesellschaft (1st edition), Aula-Verlag (2nd edition)
- Publication place: Germany

The Handbuch der Vögel Mitteleuropas (Handbook of the Birds of Central Europe, HBV) is a German-language scholarly handbook on the birds of Central Europe. For the purposes of the book, the Central European region is defined as the states of Belgium, Germany, Luxembourg, the Netherlands, Austria, Poland, Switzerland, Slovakia, the Czech Republic, Hungary, and Liechtenstein.

== History ==
The Handbuch der Vögel Mitteleuropas was originally conceived as a successor to Günther Niethammer's Handbuch der deutschen Vogelkunde (Handbook of German Ornithology), which was published in three volumes in 1937, 1938, and 1942. Work on the book began in 1958 with Kurt M. Bauer as its editor. In 1962, Swiss zoologist Urs N. Glutz von Blotzheim was asked by Bauer and Erwin Stresemann to take part in writing the book, and became its second editor. He immediately proposed the book be expanded to cover more aspects of bird biology, including distributions, and to have a greater geographic scope including countries on both sides of the Iron Curtain.

The new book also involved more contributions by other field ornithologists. Gathering information for the book was difficult owing to the lack of regional ornithological groups at the time. The resulting volumes of the first edition were published starting in 1966, and stood out from any previous works, especially in the illustrations by animal and bird painters and illustrators that included: Jörg Kühn, D. Winfried Daunicht, and Friedhelm Weick. Some of the 14 volumes of the handbook had to be divided because of their size, so that the printed book consists of 22 individual volumes and an index. A second edition was published between 1987 and 1997. The complete manual is available in PDF format on CD-ROMs.

The Handbuch has become a standard work of Central European ornithology.
