= Hov =

HOV usually refers to a high-occupancy vehicle lane.

Hov or HOV may also refer to:

== Companies ==
- Hovnanian Enterprises, an American real estate company

== Places ==
- Hov, Faroe Islands, a village located on the island of Suðuroy in the Faroe Islands
- Hov, Norway, a village in Søndre Land municipality in Innlandet county, Norway
- Hov Church, a church in Sunndalsøra in Sunndal municipality, Møre og Romsdal county, Norway
- Hov or Hou, a village in Odder Municipality on the East coast of Jutland, Denmark

== Transport ==
- Hove railway station, a railway station in Sussex, England (station code: HOV)
- Ørsta–Volda Airport, Hovden, an airport in Ørsta, Norway (airport code: HOV)
- High-Occupancy Vehicle - a vehicle that has multiple people in it and can drive in certain restricted lanes

== Other uses ==
- Hands Off Venezuela, a British lobby group
- Hovongan language, spoken in Indonesia
- Hov or hof, an old Germanic religious structure; see Heathen hofs
- Rapper Jay-Z (born Shawn Carter), whose nickname is HOV
- Hov 1, Swedish hip hop group
