= HARM =

HARM or H.A.R.M. may refer to:

- AGM-88 HARM, a high-speed anti-radiation missile
- Historic Aircraft Restoration Museum, a museum in Creve Coeur, Missouri, United States
- A fictional terrorist organisation in the video games The Operative: No One Lives Forever and No One Lives Forever 2: A Spy in H.A.R.M.'s Way
- Human Aetiological Relations Machine, an organisation in the 1966 film Agent for H.A.R.M.
- Hoosier Anti-Racist Movement, an Antifa cell based in Indiana associated with Anti-Racist Action (a.k.a. Torch Network)

Harm may refer to:

- Harm, a moral and legal concept
  - Harm principle, a law principle
  - Penal harm, a theory that inmates in prison should suffer additional pain to deprivation of liberty
- Harm reduction, public health policies designed to lessen the negative consequences associated with human behavior
- Physical injury or trauma (medicine)
- Harm (given name), a Dutch masculine given name
- Harmon "Harm" Rabb, a character in the TV series JAG
- Ray Harm (born 1920s), an American artist
- Harm's Way (novel), a 1962 war novel by James Bassett
  - In Harm's Way, a 1965 film based on the novel
- "Harm's Way" (Angel), a 2004 episode of the television series Angel
- In Harm's Way (TV series), a 2008 reality television series
- "In Harm's Way", a 2004 episode of the fan-created internet series Star Trek: New Voyages
- "Harm", a song by Broken Spindles from Fulfilled/complete
- "Harm", a song by Frente! from Shape (album)
- Harm (comics), a supervillain from DC Comics

== See also ==
- Harms, a surname
- Do No Harm (disambiguation)
- Safe from Harm (disambiguation)
