= Jean M. Carlson =

American scientist

Jean Marie Carlson
- Born: 1962 (age 63–64)
- Education: Princeton University; Cornell University
- Known for: Complexity
- Scientific career
- Workplaces: University of California, Santa Barbara

Jean Marie Carlson (born 1962) is a professor of complexity at the University of California, Santa Barbara. She studies robustness and feedback in highly connected complex systems, which have applications in a variety of areas including earthquakes, wildfires and neuroscience.

== Early life and education ==
Carlson studied electrical engineering and computer science at Princeton University, graduating in 1984. She then moved to Cornell University for her graduate studies, earning a master's in applied physics. In 1987, she switched to theoretical condensed matter physics for her doctoral studies, completing her PhD in 1988. She worked under the supervision of James Sethna on the spin glass model in the Bethe Lattice. Carlson worked in the Kavli Institute for Theoretical Physics as a postdoctoral scholar with James S. Langer.

== Research and career ==
Carlson was appointed to the faculty at the University of California, Santa Barbara in 1990. She works on the fundamental theory and applications of complex systems. She was awarded a David and Lucile Packard Foundation fellowship in 1993, which allowed her to study the physical and mathematical principles that underlie complexity. Carlson uses highly optimized tolerance (HOT) methods that connect evolving structure with power laws in highly interconnected systems. Carlson developed the HOT mechanism in the early 2000s, and has since applied it to complex systems including the immune system, earthquakes, wildfires and neuroscience. HOT represents a unifying framework that can couple with external environments, which differs from self-organized criticality and the edge of chaos.

Carlson has used computational systems biology to understand the immune system. She studies how the immune system changes with age, as well as autoimmune disease and homeostasis. Carlson worked with Eric Jones to develop a mathematical model that can analyse and predict interactions in the gut bacteria of fruit flies. It is hoped that this model will be able to explain the human gut microbiome. Their model demonstrated that the interaction between bacteria in the gut are as important to the overall health of a fruit fly as their presence in the gut.

Carlson has also applied complexity theory to neuroscience, identifying the properties of neural networks that are protected in the healthy population. Understanding these networks could explain the connection between the structure of white matter and cognitive function. Carlson looks to explain how neural networks are involved with learning and memory, by comparing them to computational and biological information processing structures. Carlson is particularly interested in sequential learning; which combines new information with previous knowledge. Her work combines computational models with experimental data from electroencephalography and magnetic resonance imaging. She demonstrated that the parts of the brain that synchronise their activity during memory-related tasks become smaller but more numerous as people age.

The application of statistical mechanics to materials science could help to describe the characteristics of granular materials. She applies shear transformation zone theory to granular material to describe how they flow and jam. This work contributes to her studies of friction in earthquake faults, rate-and-state laws and rheological chaos. Carlson has studied complexity in several areas of earthquake physics, including dynamic rupture and supershear. She developed an algorithm (Highly Optimized Tolerance Fire Spread Model, HFire) that can model the spread of a wildfire, which can be used to understand the longterm evolution of forest ecosystems and helping to coordinate forest management. She has investigated human decision-making in disaster response, in an effort to make evacuations more safe and effective. She has investigated the tradeoffs that arise in wildfire response, using models of the economy, populations and fire spread. This requires dynamic decision tools, as time delays can result in more fires and demand for resources. She has also studied how information networks impact decisions, and the relationship between information dissemination and social sharing.

Carlson has also applied complexity theory to econophysics, evolution and control theory. She holds visiting professorships at Santa Fe Institute.

== Recognition ==
Carlson was elected as a Fellow of the American Physical Society (APS) in 2021, after a nomination from the APS Topical Group on Statistical and Nonlinear Physics, "for the development of mathematically rigorous, physics-based models of nonlinear and complex systems that have significantly impacted a broad range of fields including neuroscience, environmental science, and geophysics".
