= HZ =

Hz is the International Standard symbol for hertz, a unit of frequency.

Hz. may also stand for:

- Hazrat, an honorific Arabic and Turkish title used to honour a person, used especially for prophets, e.g. Hz. Muhammad, Hz. Ibrahim, etc.

HZ may also stand for:

- HZ (character encoding)
- Habitable zone, the distance from a star where a planet can maintain Earth-like life
- Hazard, a situation that poses a level of threat
- Haze, in meteorology, METAR code HZ
- Herero language (ISO 639 alpha-2)
- Herpes zoster, the shingles virus
- Holden HZ, an automobile produced by General Motors Holden in the late 1970s
- Hz-program, a typographic composition computer program created by Hermann Zapf.
- HZ University of Applied Sciences, a vocational university in Zeeland, Netherlands
- SAT Airlines (IATA airline designator)
- Saudi Arabia (aircraft registration code)
- HŽ, the acronym of Croatian Railways (Hrvatske željeznice)
