= HTI =

HTI may refer to:

- Hti, the finial ornament placed on pagodas and temples in Myanmar
- HTI+, a former technician certification from CompTIA
- Hamilton Island Airport, on Hamilton Island, Queensland, Australia
- Haiti, a country in the Caribbean
- Hamilton Theatre Inc., a community theatre company in Hamilton, Ontario, Canada
- Heads Teachers and Industry, a training programme in the United Kingdom
- Higher Technical Institute of Cyprus, now part of the Cyprus University of Technology
- Higher Technological Institute, a college in Cairo, Egypt
- Hoti language, an extinct language of Indonesia
- Hutchinson Technology, a manufacturer of disk drive components
- Hypoxic Training Index, in respiration therapy
