= HTG (disambiguation) =

The Haitian gourde (HTG) is the currency of Haiti.

HTG may also refer to:

- Hawaii Territorial Guard, during World War II
- Hugo Treffner Gymnasium, a school in Tartu, Estonia
- Human Thyroglobulin, a protein produced by the thyroid gland
- Hunting plc, a British energy company
- Khatanga Airport, in Krasnoyarsk Krai, Russia
