= HRK =

HRK may refer to:

- HRK (gene), a human gene
- The ISO 4217 code of Croatian kuna, the currency of Croatia from 1994 to 2023
- Haruku language (ISO 639-3 code hrk), spoken in Indonesia
- Heidelberger RK, a German rowing club
- Heinz Rudolf Kunze (born 1956), German singer and writer
- Hirok railway station, in Balochistan, Pakistan
- German Rectors' Conference (German: Hochschulrektorenkonferenz)
- HRK, a Rockwell scale of materials' hardness
- Kharkiv International Airport, in Ukraine, IATA code
