= HCF =

HCF may refer to:

== Arts and entertainment ==
- Halt and Catch Fire (TV series)
- Hot Club de France, a French jazz group
- Half Circle Forward, a common move in fighting game special moves, popularized by Street Fighter II

== Buildings in the United States ==
- Honolulu Control Facility, an air traffic control complex
- Hutchinson Correctional Facility, Kansas
- Hawaii Correctional Facility

== Businesses ==
- Hard Candy Fitness, an American fitness center chain
- HCF Insurance, Australian insurer

== Non-profit organizations ==
- Hispanic College Fund
- Historic Charleston Foundation, in South Carolina, United States
- Hamilton Community Foundation, in Ontario, Canada

== Sports teams and bodies ==
- Hellenic Cricket Federation
- Hellenic Cycling Federation
- Hércules CF, a Spanish football team
- Hungarian Chess Federation

== Science, technology and mathematics ==
- Halt and Catch Fire (computing), a semi-mythical machine code mnemonic
- High-cycle fatigue
- Highest common factor
- Host cell factor C1
- Hundred cubic feet, a unit of volume
- Hybrid coordination function

== Other ==
- Hacemos Federal Coalition (Spanish: Hacemos Coalición Federal)
