= Hamilton Theatre Inc. =

Hamilton Theatre Inc. (HTI)
- Formation: 1956
- Type: Theatre group
- Purpose: Musical Theatre
- Location: Hamilton, ON, Canada
- Website: hamiltontheatre.com

Hamilton Theatre Inc. (or HTI, as it is often abbreviated) began in 1956. Credited with forming the company were eight members of the "Gilbert & Sullivan" Company who left that group to produce newer and more contemporary musical comedies. Incorporated in 1959, Hamilton Theatre Inc. functioned from a former fire hall that was renovated and augmented at Strathcona and Head Streets until 1986. After four years and 5000 hours of volunteer work by its members, the present home at 140 MacNab Street North was completed.

Since its beginning, when it took $3,000 to finance the first production, HTI has produced over 100 Broadway musicals. Some with budgets over $60,000, financed solely by ticket sales and fundraisers.

== Former members ==
Former members include Timothy J. Alex, Nick Cordero, Colin Cripps, Jason Jones, Jesse Robb, Kathleen Robertson, Victoria Snow, Steve Weston, Jim Witter, Jim White, and Lou Zamprogna.

== Shows ==
#	Year	Show	Dates
182	2027	Rock of Ages	May 7, 2027 to May 22, 2027
181	2027	Footloose	February 12, 2027 to February 27, 2027
180	2026	Evil Dead The Musical	October 30, 2026 to November 14, 2026
179	2026	Grease	May 8, 2026 to May 23, 2026
178	2026	Anne of Green Gables	February 13, 2026 to March 1, 2026
177	2025	Avenue Q	November 14, 2025 to November 29, 2025
176	2025	Big Fish	May 9, 2025 to May 24, 2025
175	2025	The 25th Annual Putnam County Spelling Bee	February 14, 2025 to March 9, 2025
174	2024	The Prom	May 17, 2024 to June 8, 2024
173	2024	Seussical	February 16, 2024 to March 10, 2024
172	2023	Fun Home	November 3, 2023 to November 18, 2023
171	2023	Something Rotten!	May 12, 2023 to May 27, 2023
170	2023	Disney's Descendants: The Musical	February 17, 2022 to March 5, 2023
169	2022	Heathers: The Musical	November 11, 2022 to November 26, 2022
168	2021	Welcome Back Showcase	November 19, 2021 to November 27, 2021
167	2020	Matilda the Musical	February 14, 2020 to March 1, 2020
166	2019	The Rocky Horror Show	October 25, 2019 to November 9, 2019
165	2019	The Who's Tommy	May 10, 2019 to May 25, 2019
164	2019	Broadway Dreamers	February 15, 2019 to March 3, 2019
163	2018	9 to 5: The Musical	November 9, 2018 to November 24, 2018
162	2018	The Wedding Singer	May 11, 2018 to May 26, 2018
161	2018	Disney's High School Musical	February 16, 2018 to February 25, 2018
160	2017	Cry-Baby	November 10, 2017 to November 25, 2017
159	2017	Sister Act	May 12, 2017 to May 27, 2017
158	2017	Memories - A Celebration of 60 Years	February 10, 2017 to February 25, 2017
157	2016	The Toxic Avenger	November 11, 2016 to November 26, 2016
156	2016	Hair (HTI's 60th Anniversary Show)	May 13, 2016 to May 28, 2016
155	2016	Broadway Showstoppers	February 12, 2016 to February 27, 2016
154	2015	Rent	November 13, 2015 to November 28, 2015
153	2015	Little Shop of Horrors	April 24, 2015 to May 9, 2015
152	2014	The Full Monty	November 28, 2014 to December 13, 2014
151	2014	Evita	May 2, 2014 to May 17, 2014
150	2014	You're a Good Man, Charlie Brown	February 14, 2014 to March 1, 2014
149	2013	Falsettos	November 15, 2013 to November 30, 2013
148	2013	Suds: The Rocking 60s Musical Soap Opera	April 26, 2013 to May 12, 2013
147	2013	Godspell	February 22, 2013 to March 9, 2013
146	2012	Blood Brothers	November 9, 2012 to November 24, 2012
145	2012	Xanadu	April 27, 2012 to May 12, 2012
144	2012	All Shook Up	February 17, 2012 to March 3, 2012
143	2011	Man of La Mancha	November 11, 2011 to November 26, 2011
142	2011	The World Goes 'Round	April 29, 2011 to May 14, 2011
141	2011	The 25th Annual Putnam County Spelling Bee	February 18, 2011 to March 5, 2011
140	2010	Sweeney Todd: The Demon Barber of Fleet Street	November 12, 2010 to November 27, 2010
139	2010	Smokey Joe's Cafe	April 23, 2010 to May 8, 2010
138	2009	Into the Woods	November 13, 2009 to November 22, 2009
137	2009	Hot Mikado	February 6, 2009 to February 8, 2009
136	2008	Jekyll & Hyde	November 7, 2008 to November 16, 2008
135	2008	South Pacific	April 11, 2008 to April 20, 2008
134	2007	Stage to Screen	December 7, 2007 to December 22, 2007
133	2007	Urinetown: The Musical	November 2, 2007 to November 11, 2007
132	2007	Anything Goes	April 13, 2007 to April 28, 2007
131	2006	A Funny Thing Happened on the Way to the Forum	November 3, 2006 to November 18, 2006
130	2006	My Fair Lady (HTI's 50th Anniversary Show)	April 7, 2006 to April 29, 2006
129	2005	Once Upon a Mattress	November 4, 2005 to November 19, 2005
128	2005	Rodgers and Hammerstein's A Grand Night for Singing	April 1, 2005 to April 23, 2005
127	2004	A Christmas Survival Guide	December 3, 2004 to December 31, 2004
126	2004	I Love You, You're Perfect, Now Change	September 24, 2004 to October 16, 2004
125	2004	Sugar Babies	April 16, 2004 to May 8, 2004
124	2003	Forever Plaid	December 12, 2003 to January 10, 2004
123	2003	Joseph and the Amazing Technicolor® Dreamcoat	October 17, 2003 to November 8, 2003
122	2003	Cabaret	April 11, 2003 to May 3, 2003
121	2003	Hats Off to Gershwin	January 10, 2003 to February 1, 2003
120	2002	You're a Good Man, Charlie Brown	October 18, 2002 to November 9, 2002
119	2002	Little Shop of Horrors	April 5, 2002 to April 20, 2002
118	2002	Twist and Shout	January 11, 2002 to January 26, 2002
117	2001	Leading Ladies	October 12, 2001 to October 27, 2001
116	2001	Pippin	March 23, 2001 to April 7, 2001
115	2000	Very Vaudeville	October 13, 2000 to October 28, 2000
114	2000	Bye Bye Birdie	April 28, 2000 to May 13, 2000
113	1999	Grease	December 3, 1999 to January 8, 2000
112	1999	Jerry's Girls	October 1, 1999 to October 23, 1999
111	1999	The Secret Garden	April 23, 1999 to May 8, 1999
110	1998	The All Night Strut!	December 4, 1998 to January 2, 1999
109	1998	She Loves Me	October 23, 1998 to November 7, 1998
108	1998	Me and My Girl	April 17, 1998 to May 2, 1998
107	1997	The Fantasticks	December 5, 1997 to January 3, 1998
106	1997	Nunsense	October 10, 1997 to October 25, 1997
105	1997	La Cage aux Folles	April 25, 1997 to May 10, 1997
104	1996	The World Goes 'Round	December 13, 1996 to January 18, 1997
103	1996	Back to Burlesque	October 4, 1996 to November 2, 1996
102	1996	Perfectly Frank	July 5, 1996 to July 27, 1996
101	1996	Oliver! (HTI's 40th Anniversary Show)	April 25, 1996 to May 11, 1996
100	1995	Red Hot & Cole	December 15, 1995 to January 13, 1996
99	1995	A Chorus Line	October 20, 1995 to November 4, 1995
98	1995	Side by Side by Sondheim	July 7, 1995 to July 29, 1995
97	1995	Mame	April 21, 1995 to May 6, 1995
96	1994	Blame It on the Movies	December 9, 1994 to January 8, 1995
95	1994	My Favorite Year	October 28, 1994 to November 12, 1994
94	1994	A Fine and Private Place	July 8, 1994 to July 30, 1994
93	1994	Meet Me in St. Louis	April 8, 1994 to April 23, 1994
92	1993	The Saloonkeeper's Daughter	December 10, 1993 to January 8, 1994
91	1993	The Boys from Syracuse	October 22, 1993 to November 7, 1993
90	1993	Godspell	July 2, 1993 to July 24, 1993
89	1993	Anything Goes	April 9, 1993 to April 24, 1993
88	1992	Pints, Pies and Pinups	November 27, 1992 to December 31, 1992
87	1992	Company	October 23, 1992 to November 7, 1992
86	1992	Nunsense	July 2, 1992 to July 25, 1992
85	1992	No, No, Nanette	April 17, 1992 to May 2, 1992
84	1991	Dames at Sea	November 30, 1991 to December 31, 1991
83	1991	Annie	October 18, 1991 to November 2, 1991
82	1991	Jerry's Girls	
81	1991	Follies	
80	1990	Back to Burlesque	
79	1990	Sweet Charity	
78	1990	Razzle Dazzle	
77	1990	42nd Street	
76	1989	Cabaret Nites	
75	1989	A Funny Thing Happened on the Way to the Forum	
74	1989	Little Shop of Horrors	
73	1988	Guys and Dolls	
72	1988	Sugar Babies	
71	1987	Hello, Dolly!	
70	1987	Peter Pan	July 10, 1987 to July 25, 1987
69	1987	Chicago	April 10, 1987 to April 25, 1987
68	1986	Barnum	
67	1986	Brigadoon	
66	1985	Annie Get Your Gun	
65	1985	How to Succeed in Business Without Really Trying	
64	1984	Oklahoma!	
63	1984	Lost and Found	
62	1984	Annie	
61	1983	Half a Sixpence	
60	1983	I'll Die If I Can't Live Forever	
59	1983	The King and I	
58	1982	The Unsinkable Molly Brown	
57	1982	My Fair Lady	
56	1981	One More Time (HTI's 25th Anniversary Show)	November 6, 1981 to November 21, 1981
55	1981	Cowardy Custard	
54	1981	The Sound of Music	
53	1980	Damn Yankees	
52	1980	Fiddler on the Roof	
51	1979	Anne of Green Gables	
50	1979	Carousel	
49	1978	Promises, Promises	
48	1978	The Roar of the Greasepaint - The Smell of the Crowd	
47	1977	L'il Abner	
46	1977	The Pajama Game	
45	1976	Dames at Sea	
44	1976	Once Upon a Mattress	
43	1976	A Little Night Music	
42	1975	Gypsy: A Musical Fable	
41	1975	Anything Goes	
40	1975	Godspell	
39	1974	Oliver!	
38	1974	Cabaret	
37	1973	Fiorello!	October 19, 1973 to October 21, 1973
36	1973	Kismet	
35	1972	Man of La Mancha	
34	1972	The Music Man	
33	1972	You're a Good Man, Charlie Brown	
32	1971	Fiddler on the Roof	
31	1971	Hello, Dolly!	
30	1970	Oklahoma!	
29	1970	Mame	
28	1969	The King and I	
27	1969	Sweet Charity	May 9, 1969 to May 24, 1969
26	1968	Show Boat	
25	1968	A Funny Thing Happened on the Way to the Forum	
24	1967	Camelot	
23	1967	How to Succeed in Business Without Really Trying	
22	1966	The Sound of Music	
21	1966	Guys and Dolls	
20	1965	The Most Happy Fella	
19	1965	West Side Story	
18	1964	My Fair Lady	
17	1964	Kiss Me, Kate	
16	1963	Brigadoon	
15	1963	Bye Bye Birdie	May 9, 1963 to May 18, 1963
14	1962	The Music Man	
13	1962	Flower Drum Song	
12	1961	Annie Get Your Gun	
11	1961	Can-Can	
10	1960	South Pacific	November 10, 1960 to November 19, 1960
9	1960	Oklahoma!	
8	1959	Bells Are Ringing	
7	1959	Finian's Rainbow	
6	1958	The Pajama Game	November 13, 1958 to November 29, 1958
5	1958	Guys and Dolls	April 21, 1958 to April 24, 1958
4	1957	Plain and Fancy	November 19, 1957 to November 22, 1957
3	1957	Carousel	May 6, 1957 to May 9, 1957
2	1956	Brigadoon	November 19, 1956 to November 21, 1956
1	1956	South Pacific	May 10, 1956 to May 12, 1956
