= Safe from Harm (disambiguation) =

Safe from Harm is the second album by Dusted.

Safe from Harm may also refer to:

- "Safe from Harm" (song), the 1990 EP from Massive Attack
- "Safe from Harm" (Narcotic Thrust song)
- "Safe from Harm", a 2005 single from BeBe Winans (in a duet with Ron Winans)
- "Safe from Harm" (Law & Order: UK), a 2014 television episode
- "Safe from Harm" (Suspects), a 2015 television episode
