= HHB =

HHB could refer to:

- Headquarters and Headquarters Battery, a US army unit
- Hermes House Band, a Dutch pop band
- Heysham Port railway station, in England
- Helsingør-Hornbæk Banen, a former railway company in Denmark
