= Heart Rhythm Meditation =

Type of meditation

Heart Rhythm Meditation (commonly known as HRM) is a type of meditation that involves the synchronization of breath and heartbeat in which the conscious control of breathing is meant to influence a person’s mental, emotional, or physical state, with a claimed therapeutic effect. The core practice in Heart Rhythm Meditation is attention on the heart and coordination of the breath and heartbeat.

== Background ==
Heart Rhythm Meditation is a method of meditation that has been expanded and developed by Puran Bair and Susanna Bair founders of the Institute for Applied Meditation on the Heart, iamHeart. The method was described in the books Living from the Heart and Energize Your Heart in 4 Dimensions. The application of Heart Rhythm Meditation to the development of spiritual maturity is described in the book, Follow Your Heart.

The practice originates from the Jesus Prayer and the teachings of Inayat Khan, who founded the Sufi order and is credited with bringing Sufism to the Western world. Puran and Susanna Bair were disciples of Inayat Khan’s eldest son and successor Vilayat Inayat Khan. The HRM founders claim that their approach is non-religious, practical, and scientific.

== Techniques ==
Heart Rhythm Meditation is described as a downward or embodied method of meditation rather than an upward or transcendent method. Practitioners synchronize the sensation of their heartbeat with full, conscious, rhythmic breathing, utilizing what is referred to as the Six Basic Powers available to everyone: posture, intention, attention, inspiration, sensation, and invocation. Seated, upright posture allows for full, complete inhalation and exhalation. Intention focuses the mind of the practitioner. Attention is placed on the heart (the physical and emotional heart), while one’s breath, both inspiration/expiration, is drawn directly into and out of the heart area. The sensation of the heartbeat establishes the rhythm of the breath while keeping the meditator’s awareness anchored in the body. Practitioners invoke entrance into their heart as a sacred temple.

Heart Rhythm meditators use the energy of their breath and heart to affect an intended purpose, typically relating to the transformation of health, relationships, accomplishments, or spiritual growth. Spiritual growth is tracked along nine steps, including the opening of the heart, completion of the individual psyche, enlightenment and illumination. Four fundamental patterns of breathing, referred to as the Purification Breaths, are employed: in/out through the nose, in through the nose/out through the mouth, in through the mouth/out through the nose, and in/out through the mouth. Each pattern channels the breath in a specific direction with the aim of creating a desired effect, e.g. stability, fluidity, power, and clarity, respectively. Through the control of the breath the practitioner's objective is to have more influence on their environment than the environment has on them.

The method of HRM involves conscious breathing, use of the full lung capacity, a concentration on the heart (both the physical heart and the emotional or poetic heart) and an intervention in the breath to make it rhythmic, through the coordination of the breath and heartbeat. "The Full Breath" technique expands the vital capacity of the lungs with full and deep breathing, while slowing the breath rate to six breaths per minute or slower. This synchronizes breath and heartbeat, creating “entrainment,” a coherent pattern of Heart Rate Variability. Research studies completed by the Heart Math Institute indicate that this sort of entrainment increases parasympathetic nervous system activity, associated with a calm, restful state. Entrainment also decreases production of stress hormones and increases production of anti-stress hormones. Another pattern, “The Square Breath”, involves a longer holding of the breath, so that the holding period equals the breathing period, for example, 8 beats in, 16 beats hold, 8 beats out. The "Square Breath" method is applied for stabilizing quality of breathing in order to reduce anxiety or feelings of panic.

== See also ==
- Western Sufism
- Heart rate variability
