= HDD =

HDD may refer to:

- Hard disk drive, an electro-mechanical data storage device
- /dev/hdd, see Device file § naming conventions
- High-definition display
- Head-down display
- H. D. Deve Gowda (born 1933), a former prime minister of India
- Hand Drawn Dracula, a record label
- Heating degree day
- Horizontal directional drilling
- Hyderabad Airport (Sindh), Pakistan (IATA code: HDD)
- Handan East railway station (China Railway pinyin code HDD)
- Honorary Doctor of Divinity
- Hard Drive Divinity, the transformed state of CPUs in the Hyperdimension Neptunia series
