= Halo.Bungie.Org =

Fan website for Halo video game series

- Halo.Bungie.org main page as of October 22, 2011
- Website type: Fansite
- Owner: Bungie.org
- Creator: Claude Errera
- Website: halo.bungie.org
- Registration: none (optional for forum)
- Launched: May 22, 1999

Halo.Bungie.Org (HBO) is a fansite created in 1999 by Claude Errera (known online by the pseudonym "Louis Wu", a reference to Ringworld) and two associates as a news site for the Bungie video game Halo: Combat Evolved. The site was started in 1999 as Blam.bungie.org based on the project's development name before it was called Halo. The site covers all Halo properties (including those associated with 343 Industries) and posts game news, rumors, and fan art and videos.

Halo.Bungie.Org grew to become the most widely read Halo fansite, receiving about 600,000 page views a day in 2007. While his cofounders ceased involvement in the site, Errera continued to update the site with the occasional assistance of others. Aside from contests, Halo.Bungie.Org also coordinates charitable endeavors and fundraisers.

== History ==
Claude Errera and several friends created bungie.org for developer Bungie's other video games, namely Marathon, in 1998. Before bungie.org, Errera had been involved in other Bungie-related sites. Halo.bungie.org began as "blam.bungie.org" on May 22, 1999, after information about what was to become Halo was leaked soon after the Electronic Entertainment Expo in 1999.

While Errera had used his real name for previous Bungie sites, his cofounder wanted to remain anonymous. At the time, little was known about the new project other than that it was set on a ringworld—a massive ring-shaped habitat. As such, the site founders took aliases from Larry Niven's novel Ringworld; Errera assumed the name "Louis Wu", after the novel's protagonist. Though the universe's Halo megastructures turned out to have more in common with Iain Banks' Orbitals, the aliases stuck and it was too late to change them. The first Halo trailer was unveiled in July 1999, and the site was renamed. Errera and the other founders searched the web for information and provided a place on Halo.bungie.org for fans to discuss and contribute.

Over time one member of staff dropped out followed by another shortly after Bungie's acquisition by Microsoft, leaving Errera the sole webmaster and the main force on the site. Errera says that the only reason he has become known as the "Godfather" of Halo is due his long-term presence in the community. Halo.Bungie.Org is unusual among large non-commercial sites in having no paid advertisements of any kind on any portion of the pages.

== Overview ==
Halo.bungie.org received about 600,000 page views a day in 2007. The site covers game news and rumors, strategy, fan-made machinima, stories and art, contests and forums. In the site's early years, it received only a small amount of fan-submitted material, which ballooned and made constant site maintenance a challenge. Errera attributed the site's longevity to the fact that it provided fans with not just Halo news but a place to share their love of the franchise. At a time when there was no easy video sharing via YouTube, Halo.bungie.org posted and categorized Halo films that fans submitted.

Each day, Errera read through the Halo.Bungie.Org forums, looking for interesting items to put on the news page and monitoring comments. He then checked other Halo and gaming-related sites for more news. He also approves fan movies or artwork and updates batches of new submitted content. Errera credits the site's success to its longevity; "When you’re there from the beginning, and you add new content every day, folks tend to come back," he said.

== Recognition and charity ==
Bungie has a strong relationship with bungie.org and called the page the ultimate Halo fansite. Halo.bungie.org is listed as a source on Bungie's project pages; Bungie employees frequent the Halo.bungie.org forums, often to point out a new Bungie update or answer questions from fans. Halo.bungie.org often receives promotional items from Bungie to give away in various contests. Halo Franchise development lead and former Bungie staffer Frank O'Connor noted that when he started at Bungie, HBO was included in the company's orientation. Its administrators and members have been repeatedly quoted in mainstream publications.

Errera has been interviewed numerous times by gaming sites such as Microsoft's Xbox.com and mainstream media organizations such as CBS and the BBC. The site was nominated for IGN's "best fansite" award in 2005.

Halo.bungie.org has used its notability to conduct several fundraisers for various causes, including raising money for Hurricane Katrina disaster relief. The site's members took part in a massive effort by the Halo community to raise money, primarily through selling collectible items through eBay auctions. These auctions raised just under $11,000 for the relief effort. Members of the community also chipped in through personal means; one member held a charity Xbox live night and raised $139. In 2003, following news that community member Brian Morden's cancer had returned, the community decided to set up a donation fund to support him. Although Brian died later that year, the fund became the Brian Morden Memorial Fund.
