= Hypergolic Maintenance and Checkout Facility =

Facility at Kennedy Space Center

Coordinates: 28.5157°N 80.6412°W

Hypergol Maintenance and Checkout Facility was a rocket fuel and engine complex located in an isolated part of the Kennedy Space Center industrial area. It was constructed in 1964 to support the Apollo program and upgraded in 1985 to support the Space Shuttle program. The hypergolic propellants used in the Space Shuttle's reaction control system, Orbital Maneuvering System, and the auxiliary power units provided hydraulic power to the shuttle's control surfaces, main engines and brakes were stored and processed in part of the complex. Part of the facility was used for cryogenic testing during the Apollo program and Solid Rocket Booster aft skirt hot-testing.

Among other structures, the facility included two hypergol storage buildings, a hazardous waste staging shelter, a liquid oxygen fuel pad, a liquid hydrogen fuel pad, leaching ponds and equipment shelters. Its Hypergol Support Building was recorded and documented by the National Park Service in 2013.

Later, part of the facility became known as the Hypergol Maintenance Facility Hazardous Waste South Staging Area.
