= HŽ =

HŽ may refer to:

- Hrvatske željeznice, the Croatian name of Croatian Railways, the national rail operator which was a single company until 2006
- HŽ Passenger Transport
- HŽ Infrastructure
- HŽ Cargo
