= AGFG2 =

Protein-coding gene in the species Homo sapiens

Identifiers
- Aliases: AGFG2, HRBL, RABR, ArfGAP with FG repeats 2
- External IDs: OMIM: 604019; MGI: 2443267; GeneCards: AGFG2

Gene location (Human)
Chr.	Chromosome 7 (human)
Band	7q22.1	Start	100,539,203 bp
Band	7q22.1	End	100,568,220 bp

Gene location (Mouse)
Chr.	Chromosome 5 (mouse)
Band	5|5 G2	Start	137,648,725 bp
Band	5|5 G2	End	137,682,988 bp
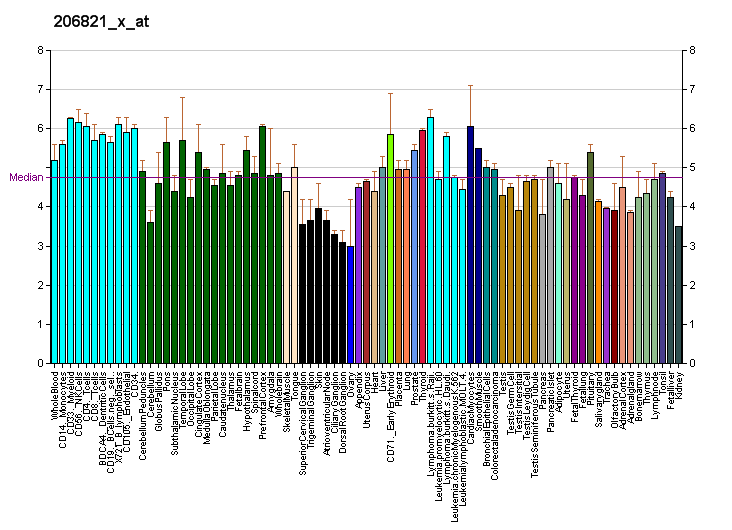

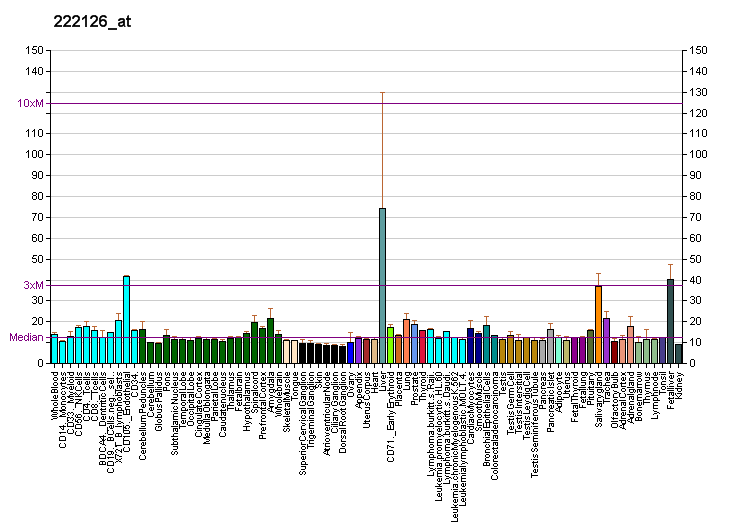
RNA expression pattern
Bgee	Human / Mouse (ortholog); Top expressed in: parotid gland; right adrenal cortex; left adrenal gland; right ovary; left adrenal cortex; left ovary; right lobe of liver; mucosa of transverse colon; minor salivary glands; body of uterus / Top expressed in: thymus; saccule; otic vesicle; Rostral migratory stream; dentate gyrus of hippocampal formation granule cell; otic placode; right kidney; olfactory tubercle; tibiofemoral joint; granulocyte; More reference expression data
BioGPS	More reference expression data
Gene ontology
Molecular function	metal ion binding; GTPase activator activity; molecular function
Cellular component	membrane
Biological process	positive regulation of GTPase activity; biological process
Sources:Amigo / QuickGO
Orthologs
Databases	NCBI: entry; OMA: entry
Species	Human	Mouse
Entrez	3268	231801
Ensembl	ENSG00000106351	ENSMUSG00000029722
UniProt	O95081	Q80WC7
RefSeq (mRNA)	NM_006076	NM_145566; NM_178162; NM_001303266; NM_001303271
RefSeq (protein)	NP_006067	NP_001290195; NP_001290200; NP_835456
Location (UCSC)	Chr 7: 100.54 – 100.57 Mb	Chr 5: 137.65 – 137.68 Mb
PubMed search
- Wikidata
View/Edit Human	View/Edit Mouse

Arf-GAP domain and FG repeats-containing protein 2 is a protein that in humans is encoded by the AGFG2 gene.

This gene is a member of the HIV-1 Rev binding protein (HRB) family and encodes a protein with one Arf-GAP zinc finger domain, several phe-gly (FG) motifs, and four asn-pro-phe (NPF) motifs. This protein interacts with Eps15 homology (EH) domains and plays a role in the Rev export pathway, which mediates the nucleocytoplasmic transfer of proteins and RNAs. Alternatively spliced variants which encode different protein isoforms have been described; however, not all variants have been fully characterized.
