= HiDef =

HiDef (short for high definition), also called 24p, is a 24 frames-per-second digital video format for high-resolution capture of motion pictures. The 24 refers to the frame rate (24 frames/second) and the p stands for progressive scanning (as opposed to interlaced scanning). As of 2003, there are two 24p HD formats: Sony 24p and Panasonic 24p.

Cameras of this capture depth have been available only since about 2001. Notably, they were used by George Lucas for the production of his second Star Wars prequel, Attack of the Clones. The advantage of shooting with digital-capture cameras is the efficiency in the production process. To edit scenes digitally, no transfer from film to digital is required. Also, if it is projected with a digital projector, no transference to film is required, either.
