= HBR =

HBR may refer to:

== Transportation ==
- Henley Beach Road in Adelaide, Australia
- Hobart Municipal Airport, in Oklahoma, US
- Hudson Bay Railway (1910), a defunct Canadian railway
- Hudson Bay Railway (1997), a Canadian railway
- Hull and Barnsley Railway, a defunct British railway

== Other uses ==
- British Honduras at the Olympics, now Belize
- Hanna Barbera Records
- Harvard Business Review
- H. B. Robinson Nuclear Generating Station, in South Carolina, United States
- Henley Boat Races
- Housing Bank of Rwanda
- Hydrogen bromide (HBr)
  - Hydrobromic acid, a solution of hydrogen bromide in water
- Harbor
- Heaven Burns Red, video game
