= High-Speed Serial Interface =

The High-Speed Serial Interface (HSSI) is a differential ECL serial interface standard developed by Cisco Systems and T3plus Networking primarily for use in WAN router connections. It is capable of speeds up to 52 Mbit/s with cables up to 50 feet (15 m) in length.

While HSSI uses 50-pin connector physically similar to that used by SCSI-2, it requires a cable with an impedance of 110 Ω (as opposed to the 75 Ω of a SCSI-2 cable).

The physical layer of the standard is defined by EIA-613 and the electrical layer by EIA-612.

It is supported by the Linux kernel since version 3.4-rc2.
