= Homothorax =

Arthropod gene

Homothorax (HTH or HTX) is a transcriptional co-factor to Hox genes that is closely connected with extradenticle. It may play a role in the identification of segments during panarthropod development. The gene acts in a similar way across the panarthropod phyla, although its expression pattern is reversed in the millipedes, centipedes and crustaceans.
