= HBCD =

HBCD may refer to:

- Hexabromocyclododecane, a brominated flame retardant
- Hiren's BootCD, an all-in-one live CD
- Highly branched cyclic dextrin, a carbohydrate
