= Hov Church =

Church in Møre og Romsdal, Norway

- Hov kyrkje
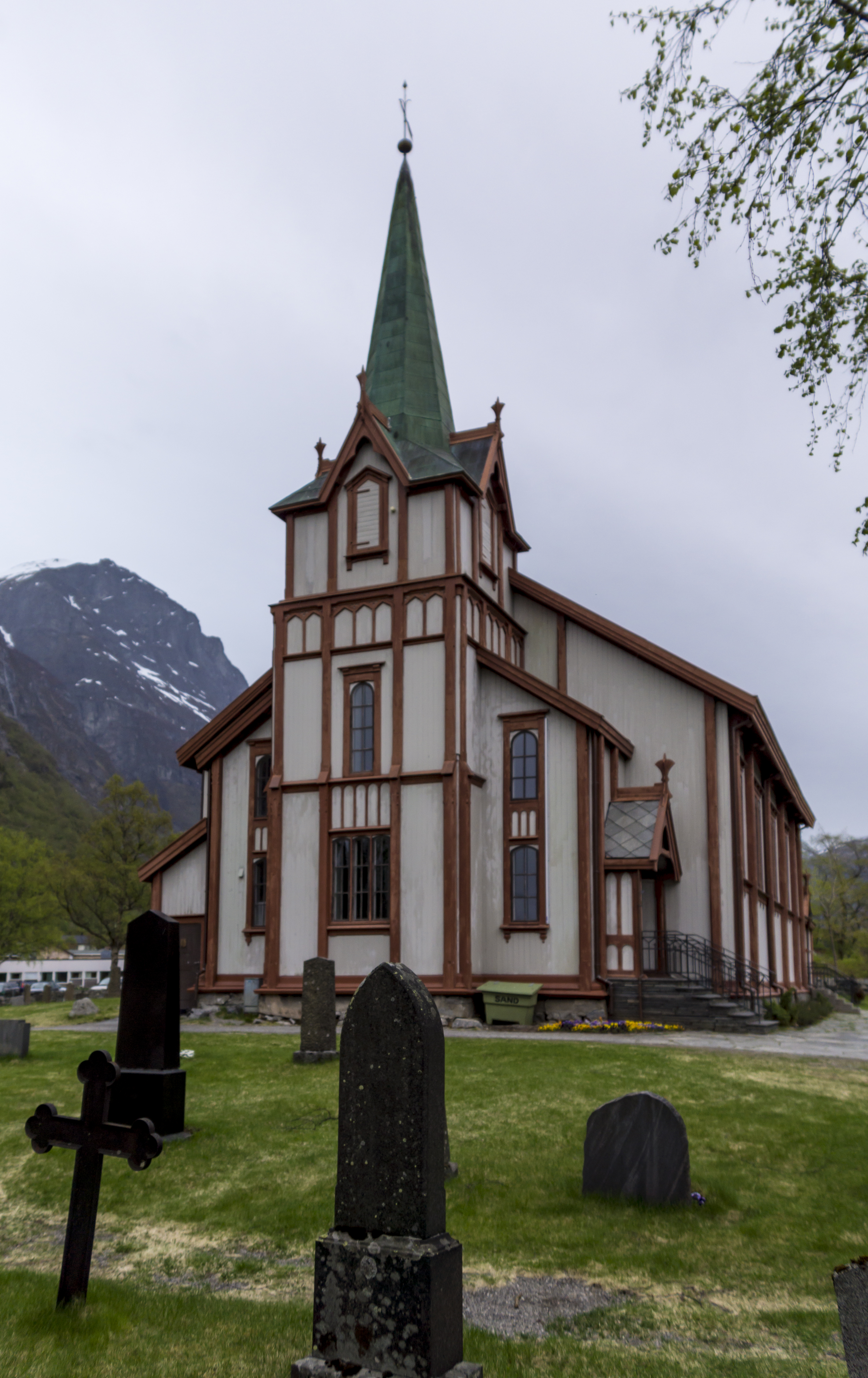
- View of the church
- Hov Church
- 62°40′22″N 8°34′12″E
- Location: Sunndal Municipality, Møre og Romsdal
- Country: Norway
- Denomination: Church of Norway
- Churchmanship: Evangelical Lutheran

History
- Status: Parish church
- Founded: 13th century
- Consecrated: 15 July 1887

Architecture
- Functional status: Active
- Architect: Jacob Wilhelm Nordan
- Architectural type: Long church
- Completed: 1887 (139 years ago)

Specifications
- Capacity: 300
- Materials: Wood

Administration
- Diocese: Møre bispedømme
- Deanery: Indre Nordmøre prosti
- Parish: Hov
- Norwegian Cultural Heritage Site
- Type: Church
- Status: Listed
- ID: 84642

Hov Church (Norwegian: Hov kyrkje) is a parish church of the Church of Norway in Sunndal Municipality in Møre og Romsdal county, Norway. It is located in the village of Sunndalsøra. It is the church for the Hov parish which is part of the Indre Nordmøre prosti (deanery) in the Diocese of Møre. The white, wooden church was built in a long church style in 1887 by the architects Peter Høier Holtermann and Jacob Wilhelm Nordan. The church seats about 300 people.

== History ==
The earliest existing historical records of the church date back to 1380, but the church was not new that year. The first church was likely a stave church that was built in the 13th century. On 6 May 1647, the church burned down to the ground in a fire. A new church was completed on the same site in 1649. This new church was a timber-framed building with a cruciform design and a church porch on the west end. The church, unfortunately, was poorly maintained and in 1725 it collapsed during a heavy autumn storm. In 1726, a new timber-framed, cruciform building was constructed on the same site to replace the old building. It was consecrated in the fall of 1726. On 19 March 1727 (less than a year later), the new church was severely damaged by an avalanche off the steep mountain located about 200 metres (660 ft) to the northeast of the church. Exterior wall supports were installed to hold up the church and it continued to be used until late 1727 when it was closed down. In 1728, Rasmus Teilgaard bought the church at the Norwegian church auction when the King auctioned off many churches to help pay off debts from the Great Northern War. The new owner arranged for the old church to be torn down and a new church to be built on the same site. The new church was a smaller version of the old church and some of the materials from the old church were reused in the new building. A sketch of this church is located below. The new church was not well maintained and the church was sold out of private ownership in 1796 when the people of the parish purchased it. After this, the maintenance of the building improved.

In 1814, this church served as an election church (Norwegian: valgkirke). Together with more than 300 other parish churches across Norway, it was a polling station for elections to the 1814 Norwegian Constituent Assembly which wrote the Constitution of Norway. This was Norway's first national elections. Each church parish was a constituency that elected people called "electors" who later met together in each county to elect the representatives for the assembly that was to meet at Eidsvoll Manor later that year.

In 1820, the church received a new roof and tower and the exterior was painted red. The building was well maintained for many years, but on 30 January 1849 it was severely damaged by strong, winter winds. Repairs were done, but they only temporarily fixed some of the issues. The need for a new church was apparent, but due to disputes over land and designs, it took quite some time to build a new church. In 1855, the bishop looked over several plans, but disliked them all so nothing was done. On 25 February 1859, the main building of the rectory burned down, killing one of the church workers. In 1863, the old church was finally torn down and work began on the new church. The new church was to be built on the outside of the cemetery fence, about 30 metres (98 ft) to the southwest of the old church site. Work on the new church took place from 1863 to 1864. The new building was an elongated timber building with an octagonal ground floor, a sacristy in the east and a church porch in the west. The new church was designed by the architect Peter Høier Holtermann and the lead builder was Jørgen Larsen Torskeløkken. The church was consecrated on 24 May 1864. This new building was hit by several very strong wind storms again on 20 January 1884 and again on 22 February 1884 which severely damaged the structure. It became a local joke to knock on the church doors before entering to see if the church would fall down due to the wind damage. The attic of the rectory was set up as a meeting room as the church was too fragile to be used. In 1884, the church was torn down and work began on a new church on the same site. The new building was a timber-framed long church design that was completed in 1887. It was designed by Jacob Wilhelm Nordan and the lead builder was Christian Hovde. The new church was consecrated on 15 July 1887. In 1953, a basement was excavated under the church and it was set up with a mortuary and bathrooms.

== Media gallery ==
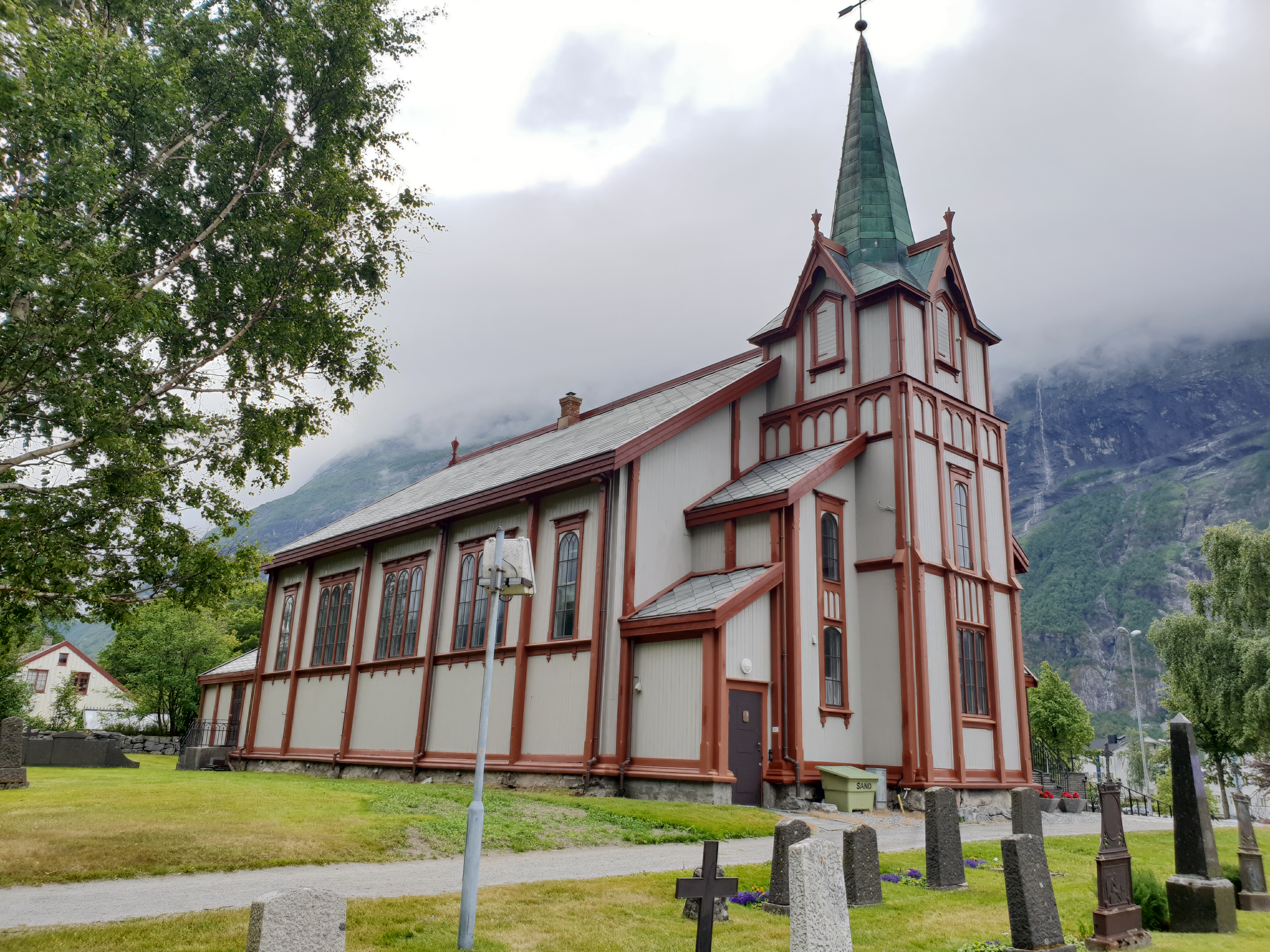
View of the present church in 2018

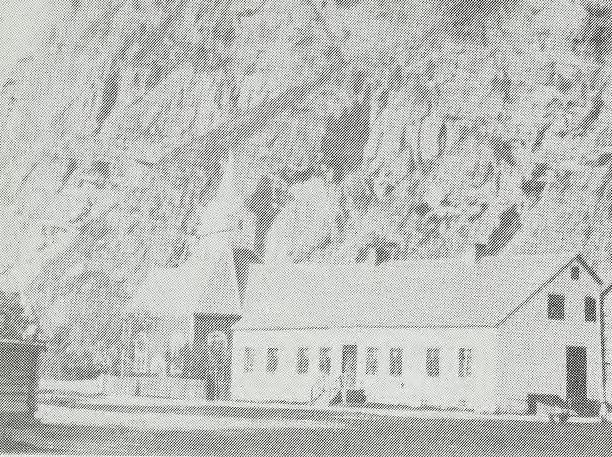
Picture of the old church (1864–1885)

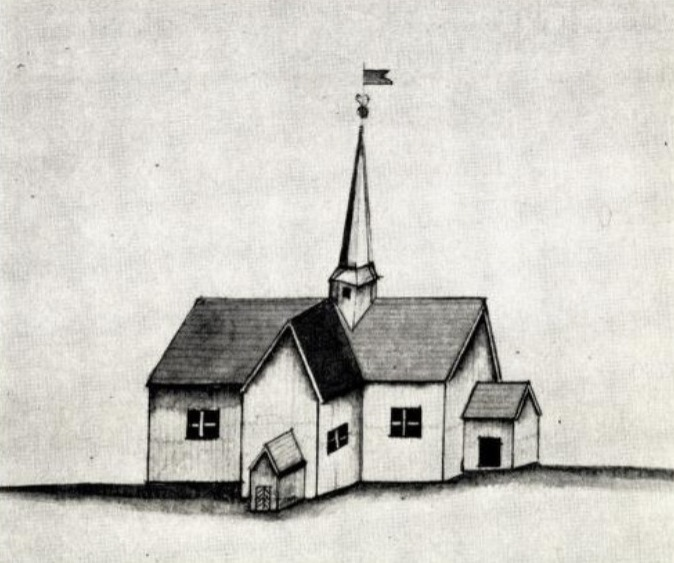
Sketch of the older church (1729–1864)

== See also ==
- List of churches in Møre
