= HEIC =

HEIC may refer to:

- .heic, filename extension for High Efficiency Image File Format images encoded with High Efficiency Video Coding (HEVC, ITU-T H.265)
- HEI-C and HEIC, aliases for CCDC5 protein
- Honourable East India Company
- Hubble European Space Agency Information Centre
