= HRT =

HRT most commonly refers to:

- Gender-affirming hormone therapy, also known as hormone replacement therapy
  - Masculinizing hormone therapy
  - Feminizing hormone therapy
- Hormone replacement therapy, a treatment used to reduce symptoms associated with menopause
- Hostage Rescue Team, the FBI's elite tactical unit

HRT may also refer to:

== Health and medicine ==
- Habit reversal training
- Heart rate turbulence
- Humane Research Trust, a British medical research charity

== Language ==
- Hértevin language, spoken in Turkey
- High rising terminal, a feature of speech

== Motor racing ==
- HRT Formula 1 Team, Spain
- Haupt Racing Team, Germany
- Holden Racing Team, Australia

== Transport ==
=== Rail ===
- Hartwell Railroad, Georgia, United States (US)
- Heavy rail transit
- Hertfordshire Rail Tours, England
- Hiroshima Rapid Transit, Japan
- Honolulu Rail Transit, Hawaii, US (now Skyline)

=== Other transport ===
- Hampton Roads Transit, Norfolk-Virginia Beach area, US
- Helsinki Regional Transport Authority (Swedish: Helsingfors Regionaltrafik)
- Hurlburt Field, a US Air Force field in Florida, US
- RAF Linton-on-Ouse, England (IATA:HRT)

== Other uses ==
- Hard real-time, in computing
- Hertfordshire, county in England (by Chapman code)
- Hrvatska radiotelevizija, Croatia's national broadcaster
- Hudson River Trading, an American firm
- Hydraulic retention time, in fluid dynamics
- Horse Race Tests, viral Twitter videos
