= HPH =

HPH may refer to

- Cat Bi International Airport, in Hai Phong, Vietnam
- Hawaii Pacific Health
- Health promoting hospitals
- Heinrich Pesch House
- Horsepower-hour
- Human-powered helicopter
- Hutchison Port Holdings
- HpH Ltd., manufacturer of the HpH 304 glider
- Human Powered Health (men's team), a professional cycling team
- Human Powered Health (women's team), a professional cycling team
