= HVP =

HVP may refer to:

- Haryana Vikas Party, a former political party in Haryana, India
- Herpesvirus papio, a gammaherpesviruse found in baboons
- High value products, defined by the United States Department of Agriculture
- Horizontal and Vertical Position (ANSI), an ANSI X3.64 escape sequence
- Hudson Valley Philharmonic, in Poughkeepsie, New York, United States
- Human Variome Project
- Hydrolyzed vegetable protein, a food ingredient
- Hypervelocity projectile, a munition
- Hansen vs. Predator, a predator investigation show hosted by Chris Hansen
