= HDL =

HDL may refer to one of the following:

== Science and technology ==
- Hardware description language, in computer engineering
- Handle System identifier for information resources
- High-density lipoprotein, complex particles
- Huntington's disease-like syndromes, a family of genetic neurological diseases

== Other uses ==
- GE HDL, a diesel engine
- Harry Diamond Laboratories, a U.S. Army laboratory
- Headstone Lane railway station (National Rail station code), London, England
- Les Hurlements d'Léo, an alternative rock band from France
