= Haelogo Airport =

Airport in Haelogo, Central, Papua New Guinea

- IATA: HEO; ICAO: AYHG

Summary
- Location: Haelogo, Papua New Guinea
- Elevation AMSL: 914 m / 2,999 ft
- Coordinates: 09°08′12″S 147°35′54″E

Map
- Airport in Papua New Guinea

Runways
Direction	Length		Surface
Direction	m	ft	Surface
12/30	430	1,411	Grass
- Source: PNG Airstrip Guide

Haelogo Airport (IATA: HEO, ICAO: AYHG), also known as Suria Airport, is an airfield serving Haelogo, in the Central Province of Papua New Guinea.
