= Molybdenum cofactor sulfurtransferase =

Identifiers
- EC no.: 2.8.1.9

Databases
- IntEnz: IntEnz view
- BRENDA: BRENDA entry
- ExPASy: NiceZyme view
- KEGG: KEGG entry
- MetaCyc: metabolic pathway
- PRIAM: profile
- PDB structures: RCSB PDB PDBe PDBsum
Search
- PMC: articles
- PubMed: articles
- NCBI: proteins

Molybdenum cofactor sulfurtransferase (EC 2.8.1.9, molybdenum cofactor sulfurase, ABA3, MoCo sulfurase, MoCo sulfurtransferase) is an enzyme with systematic name L-cysteine:molybdenum cofactor sulfurtransferase. This enzyme catalyses the following chemical reaction

molybdenum cofactor
+
cysteine
2H^{+}
H_{2}O
thio cofactor
+
alanine

This enzyme characterised from Arabidopsis thaliana replaces the equatorial oxygen ligand atom attached to molybdenum by sulfur, which is provided from the amino acid L-cysteine. A reduced electron acceptor is required during the reaction and the enzyme contains pyridoxal phosphate.
