= HND =

HND or H&D may refer to:

== Transport ==
- Haneda Airport, serving Tokyo, Japan (IATA airport code)
- Hanborough railway station, in England (UK station code)
- Henderson Executive Airport, in Nevada, United States (FAA location identifier)
- Hinterland Aviation, an Australian airline (ICAO airline code)

== Other uses ==
- H&D (film speed), by the two nineteenth-century photographic scientists Hurter and Driffield
- Croatian Journalists' Association (Croatian: Hrvatsko novinarsko društvo)
- Hexanitrodiphenylamine, an explosive
- Higher National Diploma
- Honduras, ISO-3166-1 alpha3 country code
- SLC6A19, a protein
- hnd, ISO 639-3 code for the Southern Hindko language of Pakistan
- H&D, a duo composed by Hangyul and Dohyon, former members of X1, who then redebuted as members of BAE173.
