= HL =

HL may refer to:

== In arts and entertainment ==
- Half-Life (series), a video game series by Valve
  - Half-Life (video game), the first game in that series
- Horseland, an online community and virtual game
- Harry Styles and Louis Tomlinson of the boy band One Direction, known by fans as HL when referred to together

== Businesses ==
- Hangars Liquides, an electronic music label
- Hargreaves Lansdown, a British investment company
- Hitachi-LG Data Storage, an optical disc drive manufacturer
- Hogan Lovells, an international law firm
- Houlihan Lokey, an international investment bank
- Hovedstadens Lokalbaner, a Danish local railway company
- HL Group, a South Korean company
- Hecla Mining (NYSE ticker HL)

== In linguistics ==
- ⟨hl⟩, a Latin-script digraph
- Reduction of /hl/ to /l/ in Old/Middle English
- Voiceless alveolar lateral fricative, a sound sometimes represented as ⟨hl⟩

== Science, technology, and mathematics ==
- HL gas, a mixture of sulfur mustard and lewisite
- Half-life, in nuclear physics
- Hectolitre, a unit of volume
- Hessdalen light, an unexplained light seen in Norway
- Hodgkin's lymphoma, a highly treatable hematological malignancy ("blood cancer")
- Hotline, a telecommunications link
- Hydrogen line, a spectral line
- Hypotenuse Leg, a postulate of geometry
- HL, an amateur radio call sign prefix in South Korea

== Other uses ==
- Croatian Labourists – Labour Party (Croatian: Hrvatski laburisti - Stranka rada), a political party in Croatia
- Headline, a text indicating the nature of the article below it
- Heilongjiang, a province of China (Guobiao abbreviation HL)
- Higher Level, a level of course difficulty in the International Baccalaureate Diploma Programme
- Hit list (disambiguation)
- HL v United Kingdom a law case at the European Court of Human Rights, sometimes known as the HL case.
- Hong Kong Higher Level Examination, a standardized examination from 1979 to 1992
- House of Lords, the upper house of the Parliament of the United Kingdom
- Hueiyen Lanpao, a Meitei-English bilingual newspaper of Manipur
