= HGF =

HGF may refer to:

- Harold Grinspoon Foundation, an American Jewish youth organization
- Helmholtz Association of German Research Centres (German: Helmholtz-Gemeinschaft Deutscher Forschungszentren), the largest scientific organisation in Germany
- Hepatocyte growth factor, a paracrine cellular growth, motility and morphogenic factor
- Hereditary gingival fibromatosis, a rare condition of gingival overgrowth
- Human Growth Foundation, an American patients' organization
- Mercury(IV) fluoride (HgF), HgF4, is the first mercury compound to be discovered with mercury in the oxidation state IV
