= + h.c. =

+ h.c. is an abbreviation for "plus the Hermitian Conjugate"; it means that there are additional terms which are the Hermitian conjugates of all of the preceding terms, and is a convenient shorthand to omit half the terms actually present.

== Context and use ==
The notation convention "+ h.c." is common in quantum mechanics in the context of writing out formulas for Lagrangians and Hamiltonians, which conventionally are both required to be Hermitian operators.

The expression

$$\mathcal{L} = A + B + C + ~ \text{h.c.} ~$$

means

$\mathcal{L} = A + B + C + A^\dagger + B^\dagger + C^\dagger ~.$

The mathematics of quantum mechanics is based on complex numbers, whereas almost all observations (measurements) are only real numbers. Adding its own conjugate to an operator guarantees that the combination is Hermitian, which in turn guarantees that the combined operator's eigenvalues will be real numbers, suitable for predicting values of observations / measurements.

=== Dagger and asterisk notation ===
In the expressions above, $A^\dagger$ is used as the symbol for the Hermitian conjugate (also called the conjugate transpose) of $A$, defined as applying both the complex conjugate and the transpose transformations to the operator $A$, in any order.

The dagger ($\dagger$) is an old notation in mathematics, but is still widespread in quantum-mechanics. In mathematics (particularly linear algebra) the Hermitian conjugate of $A$ is commonly written as $A^\ast$, but in quantum mechanics the asterisk ($\ast$) notation is sometimes used for the complex conjugate only, and not the combined conjugate transpose (Hermitian conjugate).
