= HSN (disambiguation) =

HSN, formerly Home Shopping Network, is an American television network.

HSN may also refer to:

- Hasan Abdal railway station, in Pakistan
- Hereditary sensory neuropathy, a medical condition that inhibits sensation
- Health Sciences North, a hospital in Sudbury, Ontario, Canada
- Xiang Chinese, a variety of the Chinese language
- Zhoushan Putuoshan Airport in Zhoushan, Zhejiang, China
- Hammerskin Nation, a white supremacist group
