= WH =

WH, W.H., or wh may refer to:

== Arts and entertainment ==
- Mr. W.H., a mysterious dedication in Shakespeare's sonnets
- Whitney Houston (1963-2012), American singer

== Language ==
- wh (digraph), in when, etc.
  - Voiceless labio-velar approximant, the sound used for the above when it is pronounced differently from w
  - Pronunciation of English ⟨wh⟩
- wh-word, a name for an interrogative word such as where and when
- wh-movement, a syntactic phenomenon involving such words
- wh-question, a question formed using such words

== Places ==
- County Westmeath, Ireland, vehicle registration code
- The White House, United States, official residence and workplace of the president of the United States, also a metonym for the president and/or his/her/their office

== Other uses ==
- Watt-hour, a unit of energy
- China Northwest Airlines, IATA airline code
- Wardlaw-Hartridge School, W-H
- Woodlands Hospital, a public hospital in Woodlands, Singapore
- Wyndham Hotels & Resorts, NYSE stock symbol
- WH Group, Chinese meat and food processing company
- WH, a designation for Whitehead torpedoes
