= HIH =

HIH may refer to:

- His or Her Imperial Highness, a title used for members of an imperial family
- HIH Insurance, a former Australian insurance company
- Harstad University College (Norwegian: Høgskolen i Harstad, HiH)
- Pamosu language (ISO code)
