= HN =

HN or Hn may refer to:

== Arts and entertainment ==
- French horn (musical score notation: Hn.)
- HN, a numbering system for Royal Doulton Figurines, e.g. HN211
- Headline News, former name of the HLN TV network
- Hacker News, a social news website

== Businesses and organizations ==
- Equair (former IATA code: HN), a former Ecuadorian airline
- HeavyLift Cargo Airlines (former IATA code: HN), a former Australian cargo airline
- Hutchinson and Northern Railway (reporting mark: HN), Kansas, US

== Places ==
- Heilbronn (vehicle registration), a city in Germany
- Herceg Novi (car plates: HN), a town in Montenegro
- Honduras (ISO 3166-1 country code)
- Hunan, a province of China
- Thesprotia (vehicle plate code: ΗΝ), regional unit of Greece

== Science and technology ==
- .hn, the Internet country code top-level domain (ccTLD) for Honduras
- Harmonic number, in mathematics
- Hemagglutinin-neuraminidase, in biochemistry

== Other uses ==
- Hellenic Navy, the navy of Greece
- Hospitalman, a US Navy hospital corpsman rate
- ⟨hn⟩, a two-letter combination used in some languages
  - Reduction of /hn/ to /n/ in Old/Middle English
- WP:HN or Wikipedia:Hatnote, a page documenting an editing guideline

== See also ==
- English horn (musical score notation: E. hn.)
- Saxhorn (musical score notation: S. hn.)
