= Hye =

Hye or HYE may refer to:

== People ==
- Hye (Korean name), a given name
- Abdur Rahman Hye (1919–2008), Pakistani architect
- Hasnat Abdul Hye (born 1939), Bangladeshi writer

== Other uses ==
- Hye, Texas, United States
- Armenian language (ISO 639-2 code: hye)
