= HLL =

HLL can have several meanings:

- High-level programming language, abbreviated to High-level Language.
- Trading name for Healthcare Logistics Ltd., a Malta-based health and care technology company
- HLL Lifecare Limited (formerly Hindustan Latex Limited), an Indian Public Sector Undertaking
- Horo Records hll jazz series, e.g. hll 101–4
- Horizontal Life Line, used for fall arrest
- HyperLogLog, algorithm for the count-distinct problem
- Hell Let Loose, multiplayer WWII first-person shooter video game
