= HWM =

HWM may refer to:

- Harlow Mill railway station, in England
- Hazardous waste management
- Hersham and Walton Motors
- High water mark
- High wet modulus, a variant of viscose rayon fibre
- Hot Water Music
- Hull-White model
- HWM (Hardware Mag), a Singaporean tech magazine
