= HMO (disambiguation) =

An HMO is a health maintenance organization, an organization that provides or arranges managed care.

HMO or hmo may also refer to:

== Codes ==
- IATA code for Hermosillo International Airport, in Hermosillo, Mexico
- ISO 639 code for Hiri Motu language, an official language of Papua New Guinea

== Science ==
- Hermanus Magnetic Observatory, the former name of SANSA Space Science, South Africa
- Hückel molecular orbital method, a simple method for the determination of electron energies
- Human milk oligosaccharide, a family of structurally diverse unconjugated glycans
- Methyl orange (HMo), an acid–base indicator

== Others ==
- House in multiple occupation, a residential building housing unrelated people
