= HV =

HV or Hv may refer to:

== Places ==
- Burkina Faso (WMO country code HV, from the former French name, "Haute Volta" -- Upper Volta)
- Hudson Valley, New York State, USA

== Groups, companies, organizations ==
- Transavia (IATA airline code HV)
- Hendrik Vermeulen, a South African fashion label

=== Military units ===
- Heimevernet, a Norwegian military force
- Hemvärnet, a Swedish military force
- Hrvatska Vojska, the Croatian army
- Hjemmevaernet, the Danish home guard

== Electronics and electrics ==
- High voltage, in electricity distribution
- hectovolt (hV), a unit of 100 volts
- Hasselblad HV, a digital system camera based on the Sony α SLT-A99V
- Home video, pre-recorded media for home entertainment

== Transportation ==
- High Volume, a term often used for kayak sizes
- Hybrid vehicles, which use two or more distinct types of power
- Hydrogen vehicle, powered by hydrogen

== Science and technology ==
- Absolute visual magnitude, or V-band magnitude, H_{V}
- Mitochondrial DNA Haplogroup HV
- Hypervelocity star, an astronomical object or as a designation of such in a star catalogue
- hν, light, in chemistry shorthand
- Vickers Hardness, a hardness test

== Other uses ==
- Holcomb Valley Scout Ranch
- Holiday village, a holiday resort where the visitors stay in villas
- Hwair (ƕ), a Gothic letter, called hv in Unicode
- Humanae vitae, a papal encyclical
- High Valyrian, a fictional language used in the Song of Ice and Fire series by David J. Peterson

== See also ==
- HV71, a Swedish ice hockey club
