= HRV =

HRV may refer to:

== Medicine ==
- Heart rate variability
- Holmes' ribgrass virus
- Human rhinovirus

== Companies, groups and organizations ==
- Harness Racing Victoria, statutory body
- Holden Racing Team, motorsports team
- AirInter1 (ICAO airline code: HRV), see List of defunct airlines of Chad
- Sahara Aero Services (ICAO airline code: HRV), see List of defunct airlines of Chad

== Other uses ==
- Heat recovery ventilation
- Croatia (ISO 3166-1 alpha-3 code: HRV; Croatian: Republika Hrvatska)
- Croatian language (ISO 639-2 and ISO 639-3 codes hrv; Croatian: hrvatski)
- Honda HR-V, a sport utility vehicle
- HRV, a Rockwell scale of materials' hardness
- HRV, seismological station code for the Adam Dziewonski Observatory
