= HAC =

HAC may refer to:

== Arts ==
- Harrow Arts Centre, London, England
- Humboldt Arts Council

== Conventions ==
- Hague Adoption Convention, a 1993 international treaty on protection of children and co-operation in respect of intercountry adoption
- High Ambition Coalition, an informal group of approximately 61 countries within the UN Framework Convention on Climate Change (UNFCCC)

== Government ==
- Hakka Affairs Council, of the Republic of China
- House Appropriations Committee, a committee of the United States House of Representatives

== Organisations ==
- Hadassah Academic College, Jerusalem, Israel
- Hague Academic Coalition
- Honourable Artillery Company, a British Army unit and a charitable organisation
- Higher Attestation Commission, a national government agency in Russia, Ukraine and some other post-Soviet states that oversees awarding of advanced academic degrees
- Humanist Association of Canada
- Sudan Humanitarian Aid Commission
- H.A.C. Inc., parent company of the Homeland chain of supermarkets in the U.S. state of Oklahoma

== Science and engineering ==
- Acetic acid (HAc)
- High acid crude oil, a crude oil with a high concentration of naphthenic acids
- High Alumina Cement (HAC), now known generally as Calcium aluminate cements
- Human artificial chromosome
- Newey–West HAC estimator
- Hierarchical agglomerative clustering, a type of hierarchical clustering
- Lucile Hac (1909–2006), American biochemist and microbiologist

== Sport ==
- Hoosier Athletic Conference
- Hóquei Académico de Cambra, a Portuguese rink hockey club
- Le Havre Athletic Club, a French football club
- Horoya AC, a Guinean football club
- Hydra AC, an Algerian football club

== Transport ==
- Hachijojima Airport, in the Izu Islands, Japan
- Hackney Downs railway station, in London
- Hokkaido Air System
- Hrvatske autoceste, a Croatian motorway operator
- Hughes Aircraft Company

== Other uses ==
- Gorani language (ISO 639-3: hac)
- Hectare
- High-availability cluster
- Honorary Air Commodore
- Hospital-acquired condition
- Hot Action Cop, an American band
- Hot adult contemporary, a radio format
- Hyles–Anderson College
- HAC, a product code prefix used for the Nintendo Switch console, its software, and accessories
- Hearing Aid Compatibility, with reference to a compatibility classification between telephones and hearing aids.

== See also ==
- Hack (disambiguation)
