= HEV =

HEV or variation, may refer to:

== Transportation ==
- HÉV, a system of suburban railway lines in Budapest, Hungary
- Hever railway station (rail code: HEV), in England, UK
- Hybrid electric vehicle (HEV)
- Hydrogen electric vehicle
- Hummer EV (Hev), the GM Hummer electric vehicle, an all-electric offroading pickup truck

== Biology ==
- Hendra virus (HeV)
- Hepatitis E virus (HEV)
- High endothelial venules (HEV)
- Hevein (protein) (hev)

== Other uses ==
- High-energy visible light
- Hazardous Environment Suit, worn by the protagonist of the Half-Life video game series
