= Highly optimized tolerance =

In applied mathematics, highly optimized tolerance (HOT) is a method of generating power law behavior in systems by including a global optimization principle. It was developed by Jean M. Carlson and John Doyle in the early 2000s. For some systems that display a characteristic scale, a global optimization term could potentially be added that would then yield power law behavior. It has been used to generate and describe internet-like graphs, forest fire models and may also apply to biological systems.

== Example ==
The following is taken from Sornette's book.

Consider a random variable, $X$, that takes on values $x_i$ with probability $p_i$. Furthermore, let's assume for another parameter $r_i$

$$x_i = r_i^{ - \beta }$$

for some fixed $\beta$. We then want to minimize

$$L = \sum_{i=0}^{N-1} p_i x_i$$

subject to the constraint

$$\sum_{i=0}^{N-1} r_i = \kappa$$

Using Lagrange multipliers, this gives

$$p_i \propto x_i^{ - ( 1 + 1/ \beta) }$$

giving us a power law. The global optimization of minimizing the energy along with the power law dependence between $x_i$ and $r_i$ gives us a power law distribution in probability.

== See also ==
- self-organized criticality
