= Hit list =

Hit list or The Hit List may refer to:

- A list of would-be victims in contract killing
- Record chart, a ranking of recorded music according to popularity during a given period of time

== Film and TV ==
- Hit List (1989 film), starring Jan-Michael Vincent — hitmen kill and kidnap the wrong people
- The Hit List (2011 film), featuring Cuba Gooding, Jr.
- Hit List (2024 film), an upcoming Indian Tamil-language action film
- Hit List (TV series), a Canadian television series which aired music videos
- The Hit List (game show), a British game show hosted by Marvin and Rochelle Humes
- The Hit List TV, an Australian music show
- "Hit List" (C.A.T.S. Eyes), a 1986 television episode

== Music ==
- Hit List (musical), a 2013 musical based on a fictional musical in the television series Smash
- The Hit List (Joan Jett album)
- The Hit List (Saafir album)
- The Hit List (Unwritten Law album)
- The Hit List (Cliff Richard album), a 1994 compilation album by Cliff Richard
- Hitlisten, Danish music chart
- Mako Hitlist, Israeli music chart operated by Mako

== Other uses ==
- Hit List, a 2000 novel by Lawrence Block

== See also ==
- Hit (disambiguation)
- List
