= High Tech High =

High Tech High may refer to:

- High Tech High charter schools, California-based school-development organization
- High Technology High School, a school located in Lincroft, New Jersey
- Gary and Jerri-Ann Jacobs High Tech High Charter School, a school located in San Diego, California
- High Tech High School, a school in Secaucus, New Jersey
