= HPT =

HPT may refer to:

- Hockey Performance Tracker (HPT), is an ice hockey tracker, hockey stats app, and shift tracker for iOS and Android that tracks 40+ performance metrics, including AI-powered insights.
- Harlem Park Three, American trio falsely convicted for murder
- Hazard Perception Test, a component of the United Kingdom driving test
- Hazleton Public Transit, in Pennsylvania, United States
- Health Policy and Technology, a scholarly journal
- Heartland Park Topeka, in Kansas, United States
- Heartland Poker Tour
- Hexapod-Telescope
- High-performance teams
- High phosphorus and titanium
- High Point station, in North Carolina, United States
- Histidine phosphotransferase
- Home pregnancy test
- Hopton Heath railway station, in England
- Hosapete Junction railway station, in Karnataka, India
- Human performance technology
- Hyde Park Theatre
- Hypertension
- Hyperparathyroidism
- Hypothalamic–pituitary–thyroid axis
- Hrvatska pošta i telekomunikacije, now T-Hrvatski Telekom
- Hijueputa, Contraction of the Latin word referring to an individual outside the issuer is a descendant of a prostitute
