= HVM =

HVM may refer to:

- HVM Racing, an auto racing team
- Hardware virtual machine
- High Velocity Missile
- Hostile vehicle mitigation
- HVM (HVM - Hery Vaovao Hoan'i Madagasikara) - a political party from Madagascar

== See also ==
- High Value Manufacturing Catapult (HVM Catapult)
