= HSV =

HSV may refer to:

== Computing ==
- HSL and HSV color spaces, which describe colors by hue, saturation, and lightness or value

== Virology ==
- Herpes simplex virus, viruses that produce infections in humans

== Places ==
- Huntsville, Alabama, United States
- Huntsville International Airport

== Sport ==
- Hamburger SV, a German football club
- HSV Handball, a German handball club in Hamburg
- Hannover 96, or Hannoverscher Sportverein von 1896, a German football club

== Other uses ==
- HSV (TV station) broadcasting in Melbourne, Australia
- Hennessey Special Vehicles, an American automobile division by Hennessey
- Holden Special Vehicles, an Australian automobile manufacturer
