= HBT =

HBT may refer to:

- HBT (explosive)
- Haifa Beirut Tripoli Railway
- Hanbury Brown and Twiss effect
- Herringbone Twill cloth military uniforms
- Heterojunction bipolar transistor
- Hole-board test
- Hydrogen breath test
