= Hughes Systique Corporation =

American provider of software R&D services

Hughes Systique
- Company type: Private
- Industry: Product Engineering Services (Communications, Media, Consumer devices)
- Founded: 2005
- Headquarters: Rockville, Maryland
- Key people: Pradeep Kaul, CEO; Anil Sharma, EVP - Operations; Ajay Kumar Gupta, Head - Global Business Acquisition; Vinod Sood, Head - Global Delivery and Managing Director, India
- Number of employees: 1000+
- Website: https://www.hsc.com/

Hughes Systique Corporation, (HSC) is a provider of software R&D services. As part of its R&D services, HSC provides Technology Consulting, System Architecture design, Software development, Maintenance and Testing services to Multimedia, Consumer Devices, Telecom/Networking, Wireless/Broadband and Satellite equipment providers.

HSC is headquartered in Rockville, Maryland (US), a suburb of Washington D.C., with a development center in Gurgaon (India), a suburb of New Delhi also another operational center in Bangalore which is a technology hub. HSC is part of the HUGHES group of companies.

HSC is a CMMI Level 5 (development model), ISO 9001 and ISO 27001 certified company.

== Technologies ==
HSC claims to focus on the following key technology areas for its R&D services:

- Embedded Android/Linux
- Wireless engineering
- Consumer Electronics (CE) Application development
- Multiscreen/Second screen
- Media player development
- Web portal design
- IMS RCS VoLTE
- Enterprise SDK
- WebRTC
- Virtualization
- Cloud services
- Big data

== Industry Affiliations ==
- Federation of Korean Information Industries (FKII)
- Amazon Web Services Consulting Partner
- Telecommunications Industry Association (TIA)
- PCMM Level 3
- CMMi Level 5
- HTNG Industry Partner
- Wireless Broadband Alliance (WBA) Member

== See also ==
- Echostar
- Dish Network
- HughesNet
- SPACEWAY
- Hughes Network Systems
