= Hidden Valley Observatory =

Observatory in South Dakota, US

- Alternative names: HVO
- Named after: Road on which built
- Organization: Black Hills Astronomical Society
- Location: Rapid City, South Dakota, U.S.
- Coordinates: 44°06′30″N 103°17′51″W
- Altitude: 3571 (feet)
- Observing time: Public summer star party dates listed on website
- Established: September 1965
- Website: sdbhas.org

Telescopes
- Telescope: 12.5" Reflector
- Mount: German Equatorial
- Telescope: 12" Reflector
- Mount: Dobsonian AltAz

Hidden Valley Observatory is an astronomical observatory owned and operated by Black Hills Astronomical Society. Located in the northwest of Rapid City, South Dakota (USA), the observatory sits on the edge of the Black Hills National Forest. The grounds include an outdoor classroom and observation field. The public is welcome on specific dates listed on the society's website.

== See also ==
- List of observatories
