= High and Mighty =

High and Mighty may refer to:

In music:

- High and Mighty (album), an album by Uriah Heep
- High & Mighty, an album by Gov't Mule
- High and Mighty (band), an American rap duo

In other uses:

- High and Mighty (book), a nonfiction book about SUVs by Keith Bradsher
- High and Mighty (shop), a UK big-and-tall menswear retail outlet

== See also ==
- High and Mighty Color, a Japanese J-rock band
- The High and the Mighty (disambiguation)
