= HESH =

HESH or Hesh may refer to:

== Places ==
- Sharm El Sheikh International Airport, (IATA: SSH, ICAO: HESH) is an international airport in Sharm El Sheikh, Egypt

== Military ==
- High-explosive squash head, a type of explosive ammunition

== Fictional characters ==
- Hesh Rabkin, a character from the HBO crime drama The Sopranos
