= Human Race Machine =

Computerized console composed of four different programs

The Human Race Machine (HRM) is a computerized console composed of four different programs. The Human Race Machine program allows participants to see themselves with the facial characteristics of six different races: Asian, White, African, Middle Eastern, and Indian, mapped onto their own face. The Age Machine allows viewers see an aged version of his or her face. A version of this methodology has been used for over twenty years by the FBI and the National Center for Missing and Exploited Children to help locate kidnap victims and missing children.

The Couples Machine combines photographs of two people in different percentages to show the appearance of their child.

The Anomaly Machine lets viewers see themselves with facial anomalies. The HRM was created by artist Nancy Burson and David Kramlich; it uses morphing technology. It was shown on Oprah on 2006-02-16.
