= HDM =

HDM may refer to:

- Haagsche Delftsche Mixed, a Dutch field hockey club based in Den Haag
- Haddenham & Thame Parkway railway station, in England
- Hamadan Airport in Iran
- Harvard Dictionary of Music
- Haus des Meeres, an aquarium in Vienna, Austria
- H. D. Moore, American computer security researcher
- HDM Furniture Industries, including furniture companies Henredon, Drexel Heritage and Maitland-Smith
- Herzog & de Meuron (HdM), a Swiss architectural firm
- High Standard HDM, a semiautomatic pistol
- His Dark Materials, a trilogy of novels by Philip Pullman
- Hockey Day Minnesota
- Holistic Data Management
- Hot dark matter, a form of dark matter
- House dust mite
- Hoy de monterrey (Cuban cigar brand)
- Hard Dynamic Monsters (CS:GO Team)
- Health Data Movers (a company providing healthcare IT services)
