= Quality =

Quality may refer to:

== Concepts ==
- Quality (business), the non-inferiority or superiority of something
- Quality (philosophy), an attribute or a property
- Metaphysics of quality, Robert Pirsig's contemplations in Zen and the Art of Motorcycle Maintenance
- Quality (physics), in response theory
- Energy quality, used in various science disciplines
- Logical quality, philosophical categorization of statements
- Service quality, comparison of expectations with performance in a service
- Software quality, how well a software fulfills its functional and non-functional requirements
- Vapor quality, in thermodynamics, the ratio of mass of vapor to that of vapor and liquid
- Data quality, refers to the condition of a set of values of qualitative or quantitative variables

== Practices ==
- Quality assurance (QA)
- Quality control (QC)
- Quality management system (QMS)
- Quality management (QM)

== Places ==
- Quality, Kentucky, an unincorporated community

== Brands and enterprises ==
- Quality Comics, an American comic book publisher between 1939 and 1956
- Quality Communications, a British comic book publisher between 1982 and 2008
- Quality Records, a Canadian entertainment company

== Music ==
- Quality (CDQ album), 2016
- Quality (Talib Kweli album), 2002
- "Quality", a song by Khalil from Prove It All, 2017
- "Quality", a song by Maluma from Papi Juancho, 2020
- Tone quality refers primarily to timbre; quality can also refer to:
  - Dynamics (music), every aspect of the execution of a given piece
  - Texture (music), the way the melodic, rhythmic, and harmonic materials are combined in a composition

== Other ==
- The qualities, short for the Quality press (prestigious newspapers) in the U.K.
