= HYP =

Hyp or HYP may refer to:

- Hatha Yoga Pradipika, a medieval Indian text on hatha yoga
- Big Three (colleges), collectively Harvard, Yale, and Princeton Universities
- Hungry Young Poets, a Philippine rock band
- Hydroxyproline, an amino acid
- Hypothetical mood in grammar
- People's Ascent Party (Turkish: Halkın Yükselişi Partisi), a political party in Turkey
- Hyp, a character in The Land Before Time series
- Hyperbolic functions, analogues of the ordinary trigonometric functions, but defined using the hyperbola rather than the circle.
