= HSS Journal =

- Discipline: Orthopedic Surgery
- Language: English
- Edited by: Charles N. Cornell

Publication details
- History: 2005-present
- Publisher: Springer Science+Business Media
- Frequency: Biannual

Standard abbreviations
- ISO 4: HSS J.

Indexing
- ISSN: 1556-3316 (print); 1556-3324 (web)
- LCCN: 2005215543
- OCLC no.: 60594372

Links
- Journal homepage

The HSS Journal, the Musculoskeletal Journal of Hospital for Special Surgery is a peer-reviewed medical journal published by Springer Science+Business Media. It covers musculoskeletal diseases and orthopedic surgery. The journal offers free continuing medical education articles without registration. The editor in chief is Charles N. Cornell (Weill Cornell Medical College of Cornell University).
