= HLN =

HLN may refer to:

- Harlington railway station (station code), in England
- HLN (TV channel), an American television news network
- Helena Regional Airport (IATA airport code), in Montana, United States
- Het Laatste Nieuws ("The Latest News"), a Belgian Dutch-language newspaper
- Hikami-Larkin-Nagaoka equation, describing weak localization in low-temperature physics
- Horizon League Network, a collegiate athletic conference in the Midwestern United States
- Phenolphthalein, a chemical indicator, abbreviated "Hln"
