= HR (girl group) =

Japanese idol girl group

HR girl band
- Origin: Fukuoka, Fukuoka Prefecture, Japan
- Genre: J-pop
- Years active: 2010––present
- Members: Yuina Aizawa; Momo Yoshikawa; Miori Amamoto
- Website: hakata-r.com

HR is a Japanese idol girl group formed in 2010. Nine of their singles have charted in the weekly Oricon Singles Chart.

== Members ==
Name	Join date	Generation	Notes
Yuina Aizawa (藍沢唯菜)	March 16, 2018	13	
Momo Yoshikawa (吉川もも)	March 16, 2018	13	
Miori Amamoto (天本みおり)	March 16, 2018	13	Hiatus

== Discography ==
=== Albums ===
List of studio albums, with selected chart positions
Title	Album details	Peak
Title	Album details	JPN
HR	Released: 17 December 2014; Label: OMAGATOKI; Formats: CD, CD+DVD	32

=== Singles ===
List of singles, with selected chart positions
Title	Year	Peak	Album
Title	Year	JPN	Album
"Kimi ni Spark"	2012	35	HR
"Barikata"	2013	30	HR
"Zenryoku Jump!"	2013	11	HR
"Evolution Da"	2014	6	HR
"Kibou no Tsubomi"	2014	5	HR
"Natsu Iro Candy"	2015	7	Non-album singles
"Toy Soldier"	2015	9	Non-album singles
"Mattouyo!"	2016	7	Non-album singles
"Nippon Hatata-ka Dai Sakusen"	2017	9	Non-album singles
