= Helena Historic District =

Helena Historic District may refer to:

- Helena Historic District (Helena, Alabama), listed on the National Register of Historic Places in Shelby County, Alabama
- Helena Historic District (Helena, California), listed on the National Register of Historic Places in Trinity County, California
- Helena Historic District (Helena, Montana), listed on the National Register of Historic Places in Lewis and Clark County, Montana
- Helena Railroad Depot Historic District, Helena, Montana, listed on the National Register of Historic Places in Lewis and Clark County, Montana
- Helena West Main Street Historic District, Helena, Montana, listed on the National Register of Historic Places in Lewis and Clark County, Montana
- Mount Helena Historic District, Helena, Montana, listed on the National Register of Historic Places in Lewis and Clark County, Montana

== See also ==
- St. Helena Historic Commercial District, St. Helena, California, listed on the National Register of Historic Places in Napa County, California
