= HFE =

HFE may refer to:

== Science and technology ==
- HFE (gene), a gene that encodes the Human hemochromatosis protein
- Hello from Earth, an interstellar radio message
- Hidden Field Equations, a cryptosystem
- H-parameter model (h_{FE}), the current gain of a bipolar junction transistor
- Human factors engineering
- Hydrofluoroether, a solvent

== Transport ==
- Hefei Luogang International Airport, in Anhui, China, now defunct
- Hefei Xinqiao International Airport, in Anhui, China
- Hertford East railway station, in England

== Other uses ==
- Health First Europe
- Herschend Family Entertainment Corporation, an American entertainment company
- Horizontal Fiscal Equalisation, in Australia
