= HGC =

HGC can stand for:

- Harvard Glee Club
- Hercules Graphics Card
- HGC (field hockey), a Dutch field hockey club located in Wassenaar, South Holland on the border of The Hague
- HGC Global Communications, an internet service provider in Hong Kong
- H.O.C. Gazellen-Combinatie, a Dutch field hockey club
- Human Genetics Commission
