= HCT Co., Ltd. =

South Korean tech company

- Type: Private
- Industry: Semiconductor
- Founded: 2000
- Headquarters: Icheon, South Korea
- Products: Particle counters Inhalation Toxicity System; Mobile Phone antennas
- Services: Compliance testing Equipment Calibration; Air Quality Monitoring; Antenna Development
- Website: Official website

HCT Co., Ltd. is a South Korean compliance testing and equipment calibration company that also develops particle counters and antennas. Founded in 2000 as Hyundai Calibration & Certification Technologies Co., the company is a spin-off from Hyundai Electronics, the world's second-largest memory chipmaker. HCT has testing and calibration sites in Korea, the United States, and China.

== History ==
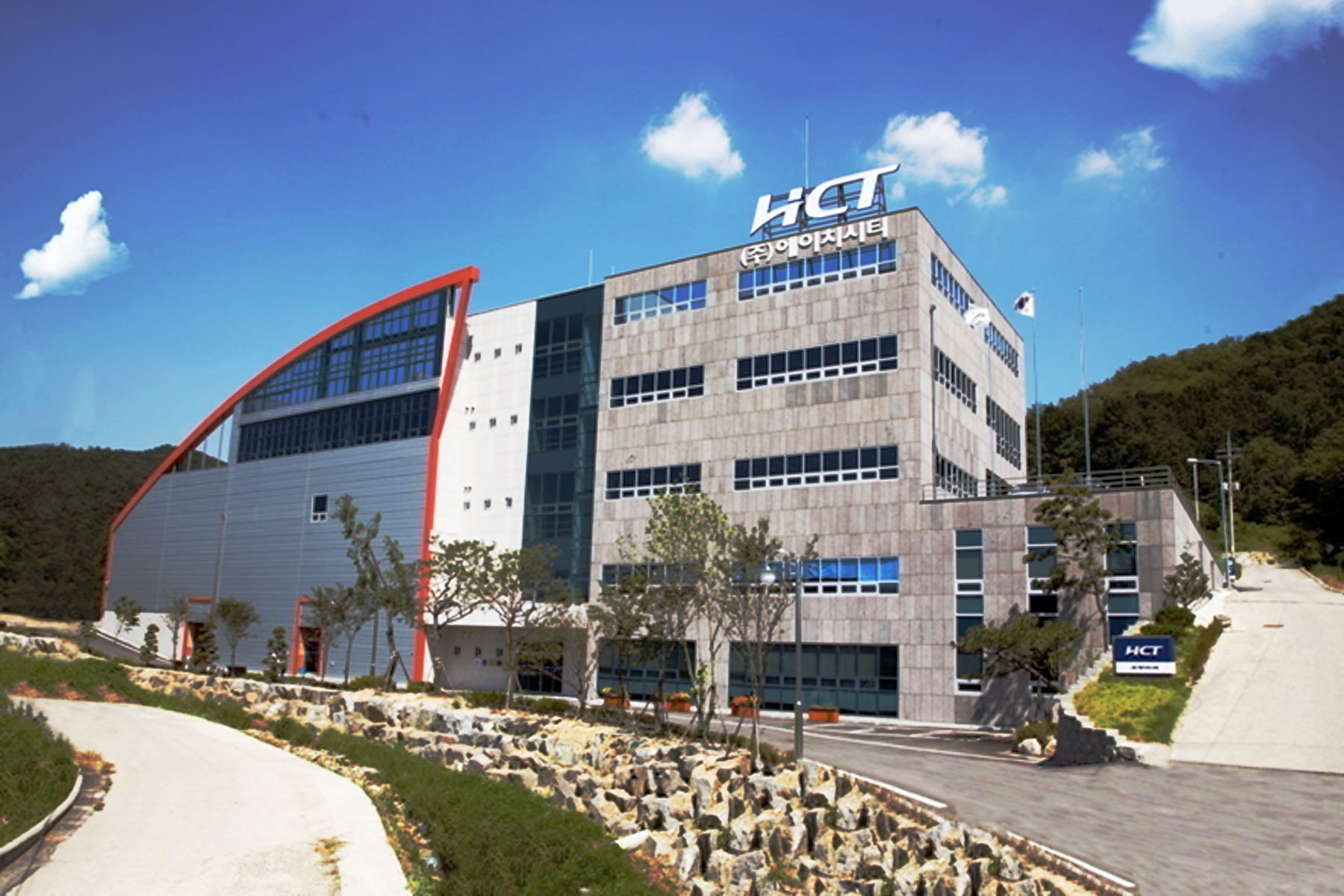
HCT Headquarters in Icheon, South Korea

- 2000 Hyundai Calibration & Certification Technology Co., Ltd founded as a spin-off from Hyundai Electronics
- 2000 Accredited as a Certified Calibration Laboratory by the Korean Agency for Technology and Standards KOLAS (ISO/IEC 17025)
- 2002 Accredited as a Certified Testing Laboratory by the Korean Agency for Technology and Standards KOLAS (ISO/IEC 17025)
- 2006 Established HCT's China branch (Wuxi)
- 2006 Developed their first Scanning Nano Particle Counter (SNPC).
- 2007 Officially renamed HCT Co., Ltd. from Hyundai Calibration & Certification Technologies
- 2010 Established a branch in Dallas, Texas for field testing
- 2011 Relocated to the new HCT head office building in Icheon, South Korea
- 2012 Established HCT America (San Jose, CA)
- 2013 HCT America LLC TCB Accreditation
- 2015 Telepermit (New Zealand) Accreditation
- 2016 CRA (Iran) Accreditatio
- 2016 A2LA (United States) Accreditation
- 2016 Listed on the Stock Exchange (KOSDAQ)
- 2017 HCT America LLC A2LA Accreditation (ISO/IEC 17025) )
- 2017 Hyundai-Kia Motors EMC Testing Lab Accrued

== Products and services ==
=== Compliance Testing ===
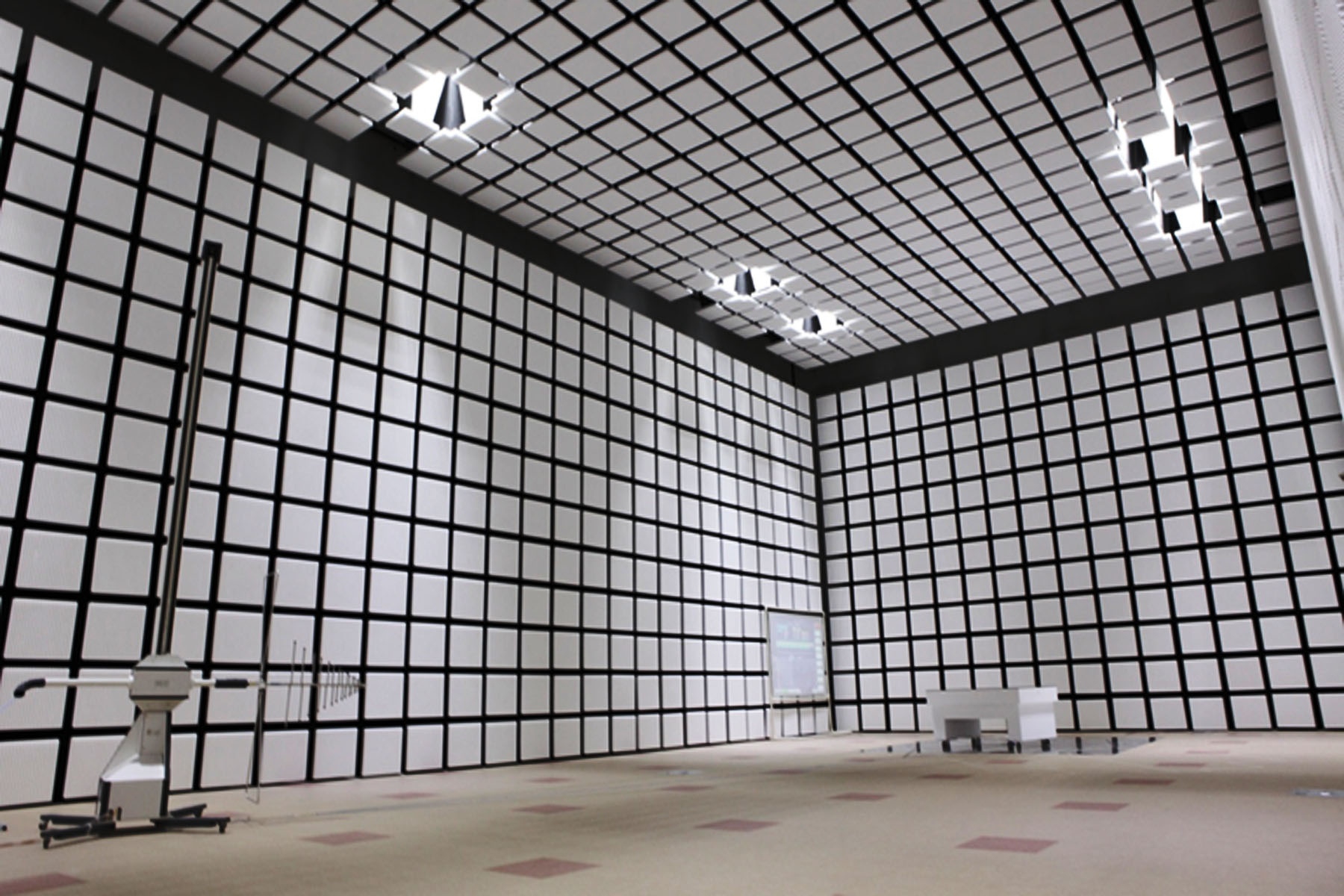
HCT's 10m Semi-Anechoic Testing Chamber

- EMC Testing
- RF Testing
- Safety and Reliability Testing
- Battery Testing
- SAR and OTA
- Wired Telephony Testing
- Wireless Telecommunications Testing

=== Equipment Calibration ===
- Particle Counters
- Aircraft Approach & Landing Systems Equipment
- Calibration Software for AT4 signal generator

=== Research and development ===
- Particle Counters
- Wide Range Aerosol Particle Spectrometer (WAPS)-developed with Samsung Electronics
- Impactors for Clean Room Environments
- Inhalation Toxicity Systems

=== Antennas ===
- Low Frequency Card Antennas
- Mobile Phone Antennas (Internal)
- Mobile Phone Antennas (FPCB Type)
- Automobile Multi Band Antennas
- Metal Case Dual SIM Phone Antennas
