= HG =

Hg is the chemical symbol of the element mercury (from its Latin name hydrargyrum).

Hg, hg, HG, inHg or "Hg may also refer to:

== Arts and media ==
- H. G. Wells, English writer
- House & Garden or HG, a former US magazine
- Harry G. Nelson, half of the Roy and HG comedy duo
- Hengwrt Chaucer or Hg, a manuscript of the Canterbury Tales
- Masaki Sumitani or HG, Japanese professional wrestler

== Organizations ==
- Hg (equity firm), headquartered in London and Munich
- Hg Capital Trust, a British investment trust
- Hengdian Group, a Chinese private conglomerate
- Hlinka Guard, a militia movement of the Slovak People's Party from 1938 to 1945
- Niki (airline) (IATA code HG)
- Handelsstandens Gymnastikforening, former Danish sports club

== Places ==
- HG postcode area, in Yorkshire, England
- Bad Homburg vor der Höhe, Germany (vehicle plate code HG)
- Hougang, in Singapore
- Hillgrove Secondary School, a secondary school in Bukit Batok, Singapore

== Science and technology ==
- hg, the driver program of Mercurial, a version Control system
- Hectogram (mass unit), a unit of weight equal to 100 grams
- Hyperemesis gravidarum, a complication of pregnancy
- Inch of mercury, a unit of measurement for pressure
- Human geography, a branch of geography
- Harmonic generation, a non-linear optical phenomenon

== Other uses ==
- His/Her Grace, a style used for various high-ranking personages
- Huge-Gigantacus, a hero in the mobile video game Plants vs. Zombies Heroes

== See also ==
- Archer Maclean's Mercury or [Hg] Hydrium, a video game
- Hengdian, Zhejiang, China
