= Urs Noel Glutz von Blotzheim =

Swiss zoologist

Urs Noel Glutz von Blotzheim (born 18 December 1932 in Solothurn) is a Swiss zoologist, who is primarily known for his ornithological work. Glutz von Blotzheim is Professor Emeritus at the University of Bern. He is an honorary member of the British Ornithologists' Union.
