= HJ =

HJ may refer to:

== Science, technology, and mathematics ==
- Hall–Janko group, a mathematical group
- Hamilton–Jacobi equation, an equation in classical mechanics which also has relations to quantum physics
- U.S. code for a cryptographic key change; see cryptoperiod

== Other uses ==
- ⟨hj⟩, a two-letter combination used in some languages
- hj-reduction in English, dropping the /h/ sound before /j/
- Hajji (Hj.), an Islamic honorific
- Handjob
- hic jacet ('here lies'), Latin phrase on gravestones
- Hilal-i-Jurat, post-nominal for Pakistan honour
- Hitler-Jugend (Hitler Youth)
- Holden HJ, an Australian car 1974-1976
- Hot Jupiter, a type of planet
- Tasman Cargo Airlines, IATA airline designator
- Jiaguwen Heji, the standard comprehensive collection of rubbings of ancient Chinese oracle bone inscriptions
- "High jump" athletics abbreviation in track and field
