= HM =

HM or hm may refer to:

== Arts and entertainment ==
- HM (magazine), a Christian hard rock magazine

== Businesses, groups, organizations ==
- H&M, a Swedish clothing company
- Hindustan Motors, an automobile manufacturer of India
- Air Seychelles (IATA airline code HM)
- HM Transport, a bus company in the Philippines

== People ==
- Henry Molaison, aka Patient H.M., a man with anterograde amnesia
- His or Her Majesty, a form of address for various monarchs
- Home Minister, an interior minister
- Hospital corpsman, in the United States Navy
- Sisters of the Holy Humility of Mary's postnominal initials

== Other uses ==
- Heard Island and McDonald Islands (ISO 3166 digram and FIPS PUB 10-4 territory code HM)
  - .hm, the Internet country code top-level domain ostensibly for the above
- Hectometre (hm), an SI unit of length
- Hindley–Milner type system, in mathematics
- "Half marathon" athletics abbreviation in road racing
