= List of NASA launch vehicles =

This is a list of launch vehicles used in missions by the National Aeronautics and Space Administration. Intercontinental ballistic missiles such as the SM-65 Atlas, are not included. Launch vehicles used for missions operated by private companies (such as SpaceX) for NASA are also not included.

== List ==
Name	Years in operation	Program	Notes
Big Joe 1	1959	Project Mercury	
Blue Scout II	1961	Project Mercury	
Little Joe	1959-1961	Project Mercury	
Mercury-Redstone Launch Vehicle	1960-1961	Project Mercury	First crewed launch vehicle
Titan II GLV	1964-1966	Project Gemini	
Little Joe II	1963-1966	Apollo program	Uncrewed, used for testing the launch escape system
Saturn I	1961-1965	Apollo program	United States' first medium-lift launch vehicle
Saturn IB	1966-1975	Apollo program	Also used in the Apollo-Soyuz mission
Saturn V	1967-1973	Apollo program	First launch vehicle to take humans past Low Earth orbit, used in Skylab missions
Space Shuttle	1981-2011	Space Shuttle program	First partially reusable launch vehicle
Atlas V	2002-2025	Commercial Crew Program	Active as of June 2025, retiring
Space Launch System	2022-	Artemis program	Active as part of the Artemis program
Delta rocket family	1960-2024	Various programs	
Atlas rocket family	1957-	Various programs	Active
Titan rocket family	1958-2005	Various programs	
