= Hy =

Hy or HY may refer to:

== Science and technology ==
- Hy (programming language), a Lisp dialect for Python
- HY (satellite), a series of Chinese marine remote sensing satellites
- H-Y antigen, a male tissue specific antigen

== Other uses ==
- HY (band), a Japanese band
- Hy (island), a pre-Christian and early Christian name for the Scottish island Iona
- Hy (name), a given name, nickname, or surname
- hy (company), South Korean food company
- Armenian language (ISO 639-1 language code: hy)
- Uzbekistan Airways (IATA code: HY), the national airline of Uzbekistan

== See also ==
- HY-80, a type of alloy steel
- HY-124798, a chemical compound
- HY Velorum, a binary star system
- Hy-V, a flight experiment research project
- HY1935 bayonet, a Chinese infantry weapon
- HYS (disambiguation)
- HI (disambiguation)
- High (disambiguation)
