= Hy Hintermeister =

Hy Hintermeister is a pseudonym for:

- John Henry Hintermeister (1869–1945), Swiss-born American artist, father of Henry
- Henry Hintermeister (1887–1970), American painter and illustrator, son of John Henry
