= HI =

HI or Hi may refer to:

== Arts and entertainment ==
=== Music ===
- "Hi", a song by Ofra Haza, Israel's entry in the 1983 Eurovision Song Contest
- Hi Records, in music, a Memphis soul and rockabilly label
- Hi (Elizabeth Barraclough album), a 1979 album by the American musician
- Hi (Texas album), 2021, by Scottish band Texas
  - "Hi" (song), the title track
- Hi (EP), 2006, by Psapp
- Hi~, a 2015 repackage of South Korean girl group Lovelyz' 2014 album Girls' Invasion
- "Hi", a song by Xiu Xiu from the album Always, 2012
- "Hi", a song by Moka Only from the album Concert for One, 2017
- "Hi!", a song by Madeon, 2025

=== Other media ===
- Hello Internet, a podcast hosted by CGP Grey and Brady Haran
- Hi (magazine), teen-lifestyle publication
- Hi, a character in the comic strip Hi and Lois
- Hi (film), 2026 Indian film by Vishnu Edavan
- Hi Brown (1910–2010), American producer

== Language ==
- Hi, a greeting in the English language similar to hello
- Hi (cuneiform), a cuneiform sign
- Hi (kana) (ひ, ヒ), a Japanese written character
- Hindi, an Indo-Aryan language (ISO 639-1 language code HI)
- Hi (Armenian letter) (Յ), an Armenian script letter

== Organizations and events ==
- Harlem International Film Festival, an annual five-day film festival
- Hostelling International, a federation of youth hostel associations
- Houston Industries Incorporated, former name of GenOn Energy
- University of Iceland, abbreviated "HÍ", from Háskóli Íslands

== Places ==
- Hi River, also known as the Ili River, in northwestern China
- Hainan, a province of China (Guobiao abbreviation HI)
- Hawaii, US
- Hotel Indonesia, a hotel in Jakarta, Indonesia

== Science and technology ==
- Hydrogen iodide, in chemistry, a diatomic molecule
- Health informatics, a discipline at the intersection of information science, computer science, and health care
- Historical institutionalism, in sociology, a social science method
- Hormonal imprinting, a biological phenomenon
- Hemagglutination inhibition, method for quantifying the relative concentration of viruses, bacteria, or antibodies
- Human interface

== Other uses ==
- Subtitles for the hearing impaired (code "HI")
- Hi Brigham (1892–1987), American football player
- Hi Brown (1910–2010), American producer
- Humorous Interpretation, an event in high school forensics competitions

== See also ==
- H I region, in astronomy, an interstellar cloud composed of neutral atomic hydrogen
- H&I (disambiguation)
- High (disambiguation)
- HY (disambiguation)
- Hydrogen-1, in physics, an isotope of hydrogen with one proton and zero neutrons (also known as protium)
- HAAi, Australian music producer and DJ
