= HYV =

HYV may refer to:

- High-yielding variety in agroindustry
- Hindu Yuva Vahini, a Hindutva youth militia
- Hy-V, a scramjet research program
- Hyvinkää Airfield, in Finland
