= Hy (name) =

Hy is a name used as a given name, nickname, or surname. It most commonly appears as a masculine given name, or as a nickname for people with given names such as Hyman or Henry. It is also a Vietnamese surname. (Note: See Xu (surname 許)) Notable people with this name include:

== First name ==
=== Arts ===
- Hy Eisman (1927–2025), American cartoonist
- Hy Hintermeister, pseudonym of:
  - John Henry Hintermeister (1869–1945), Swiss-born American artist, father of Henry
  - Henry Hintermeister (1887–1970), American painter and illustrator, son of John Henry
- Hy Mayer (1868–1954), German-American cartoonist and animator
- Hy Sandham (1842–1910), Canadian painter and illustrator

=== Entertainment ===
- Hy Anzell (1923–2003), American actor
- Hy Averback (1920–1997), American actor, producer and director
- Hy Brown (1910–2010), American producer of radio and television programs
- Hy Gardner (1908–1989), American entertainment reporter and syndicated columnist
- Hy Hazell (1919–1970), British actress
- Hy Heath (1890–1965), American entertainer, songwriter, composer and author
- Hy Hollinger (1918–2015), American trade journalist and studio publicist
- Hy Kraft (1899–1975), American screenwriter, playwright, and theatrical producer
- Hy Lit (1934–2007), American disc jockey
- Hy Pyke (1935–2006), American character actor
- Hy Weiss (1923–2007), American record producer
- Hy Zaret (1907–2007), American lyricist and composer

=== Photography ===
- Hy Hirsh (1911–1961), American photographer
- Hy Peskin (1915–2005), American photographer

=== Sports ===
- Hy Buller (1926–1968), Canadian-born ice hockey player
- Hy Cohen (1931–2021), American baseball pitcher
- Hy Gotkin (1922–2004), American basketball player
- Hy Gunning (1888–1975), American baseball player
- Hy Myers (1889–1965), American baseball player
- Hy Turkin (1915–1955), American sportswriter, co-editor of the first baseball encyclopedia
- Hy Vandenberg (1906–1994), American baseball player

=== Other ===
- Hy Kloc (1947-2022), American politician in Idaho
- Hy Larner (1913–2002), American gangster
- Hy Spinrad (1934–2015), American astronomer

== Last name ==
- Michael Hồ Đình Hy (1808–1857), Vietnamese martyr
- Patricia Hy-Boulais (born 1965), Cambodian-born former tennis player who represented Hong Kong and Canada
- Richard Hy (born 1987 or 1988), American law enforcement officer and social media personality
