= HYS =

HYS or HyS may refer to:

- Hayes railway station (station code: HYS), a railway station located in Hayes in the London Borough of Bromley
- Hays Regional Airport (IATA code: HYS), a general-aviation airport in Ellis County, Kansas
- Heep Yunn School, an Anglican girls' secondary school in Hong Kong
- Hybrid sulfur cycle (HyS), a two-step water-splitting process
- HYS The Hague, the ice hockey club in The Hague, Netherlands
