= H&I =

H&I may refer to:

- Highbury & Islington station, a railway station in London, England
- Heroes & Icons, an American television network
- Harassment and Interdiction, term used in the Vietnam War for Harassing fire
