= Hormonal imprinting =

Hormonal imprinting (HI) is a phenomenon which takes place at the first encounter between a hormone and its developing receptor in the critical periods of life (in unicellulars during the whole life) and determines the later signal transduction capacity of the cell. The most important period in mammals is the perinatal one, however this system can be imprinted at weaning, at puberty and in case of continuously dividing cells during the whole life. Faulty imprinting is caused by drugs, environmental pollutants and other hormone-like molecules present in excess at the critical periods with lifelong receptorial, morphological, biochemical and behavioral consequences. HI is transmitted to the hundreds of progeny generations in unicellulars and (as proved) to a few generations also in mammals.
