= Henry Hintermeister =

American painter (1897–1970)

- Born: Henry Adam August Hintermeister; June 10, 1897; New York
- Died: June 18, 1970 (aged 73); Pinellas, Florida
- Other name: Henry J. Hintermeister

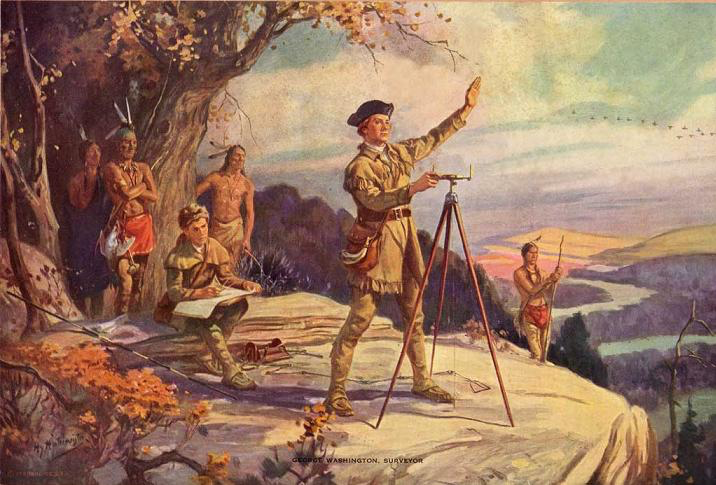
Hintermeister's George Washington, Surveyor (1948)

Henry Hintermeister (1897–1970) was a painter and illustrator who painted in the Golden Age of Illustration under the signature Hy Hintermeister. He painted as team with his father, John Henry Hintermeister, and together they created more than 1000 works. Hintermeister may have begun began his professional career as early as 1914 (age 17), when a copyright for a Henry Hintermeister was registered. He is best known today for his "American themed paintings."

Hintermeister's earliest published works featured family, images of women and children, dogs, horses and recreation. He also painted fantastic scenes, with Indian maidens and scantily clad Romans and Egyptians. In later years, he created ionic and semi-comical works, with subjects including the multiple dangers of crossing the street, children and grandparents, fishermen, policemen, boy scouts and hunters. One of his iconic works was the "Uncle Natchel" series of paintings for Chilean Natural Soda, which debuted in 1935 as a calendar print and ran into the early 1960s.

While Hintermeister surpassed his father in 21st century databases, by being the main person associated with the signature "Hy Hintermeister," he got his start teaming with his father. Collectors have found it difficult on some works to tell the creator from the signature alone. When Hintermeister began having works published in his name in 1919, his father had been working for about 30 years. When his father died in 1945, Hintermeister continued to paint for about 25 years more. Between them, their shared "Hy Hintermeister" had mature painters signing it for decades.

== Name ==
Hintermeister appeared on documents for most of his life without a middle initial. However, his birth certificate named him Henry August Adam Hintermeister, and on the 1910 census he was Henry A. A. Hintermeister. He was Henry A. Hintermeister in the New York census in 1905 and 1915.

After his father's death, he began to have some works copyrighted as Henry J. Hintermeister.

== Gallery ==
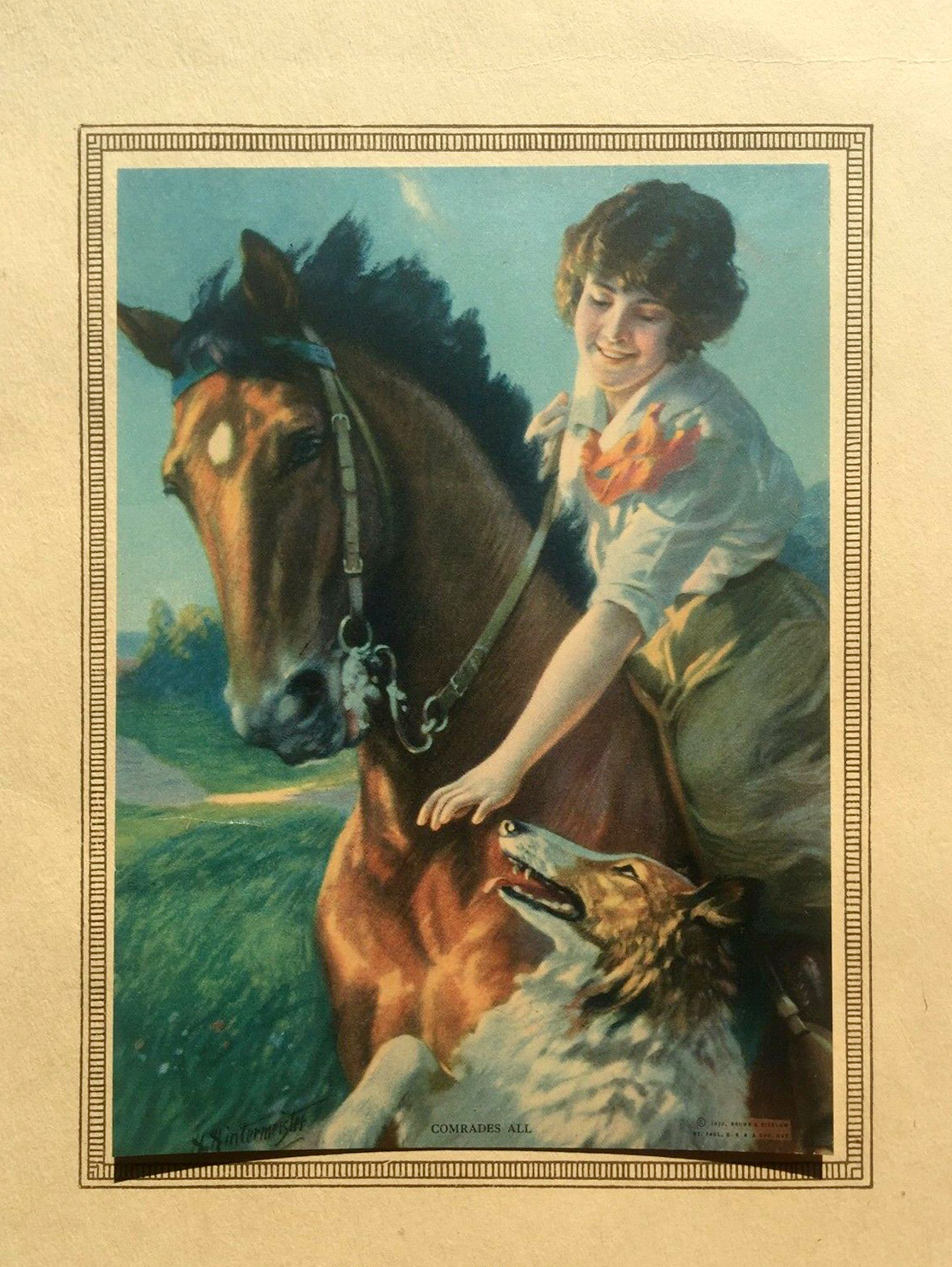
1921, Comrades All. Could be by either Henry or John Henry Hintermeister; copyright book didn't specify for this print.

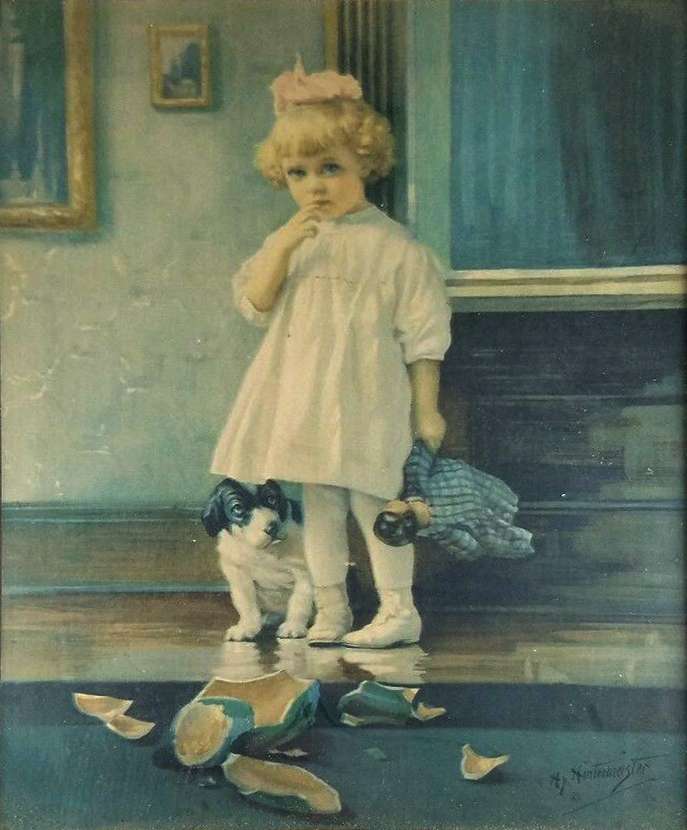
1923, Guilty by Henry Hintermeister

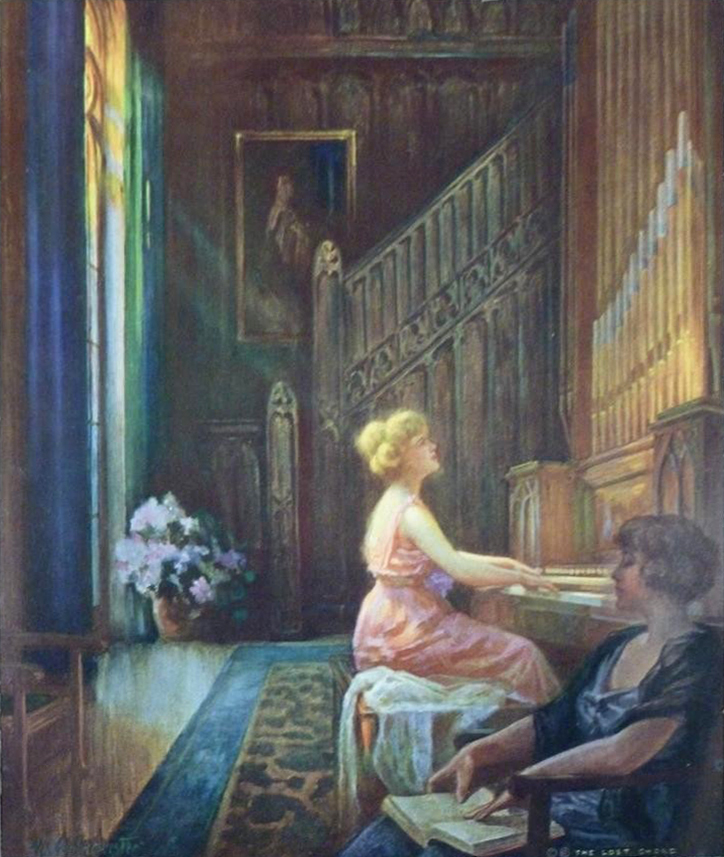
1923, Lost Chord

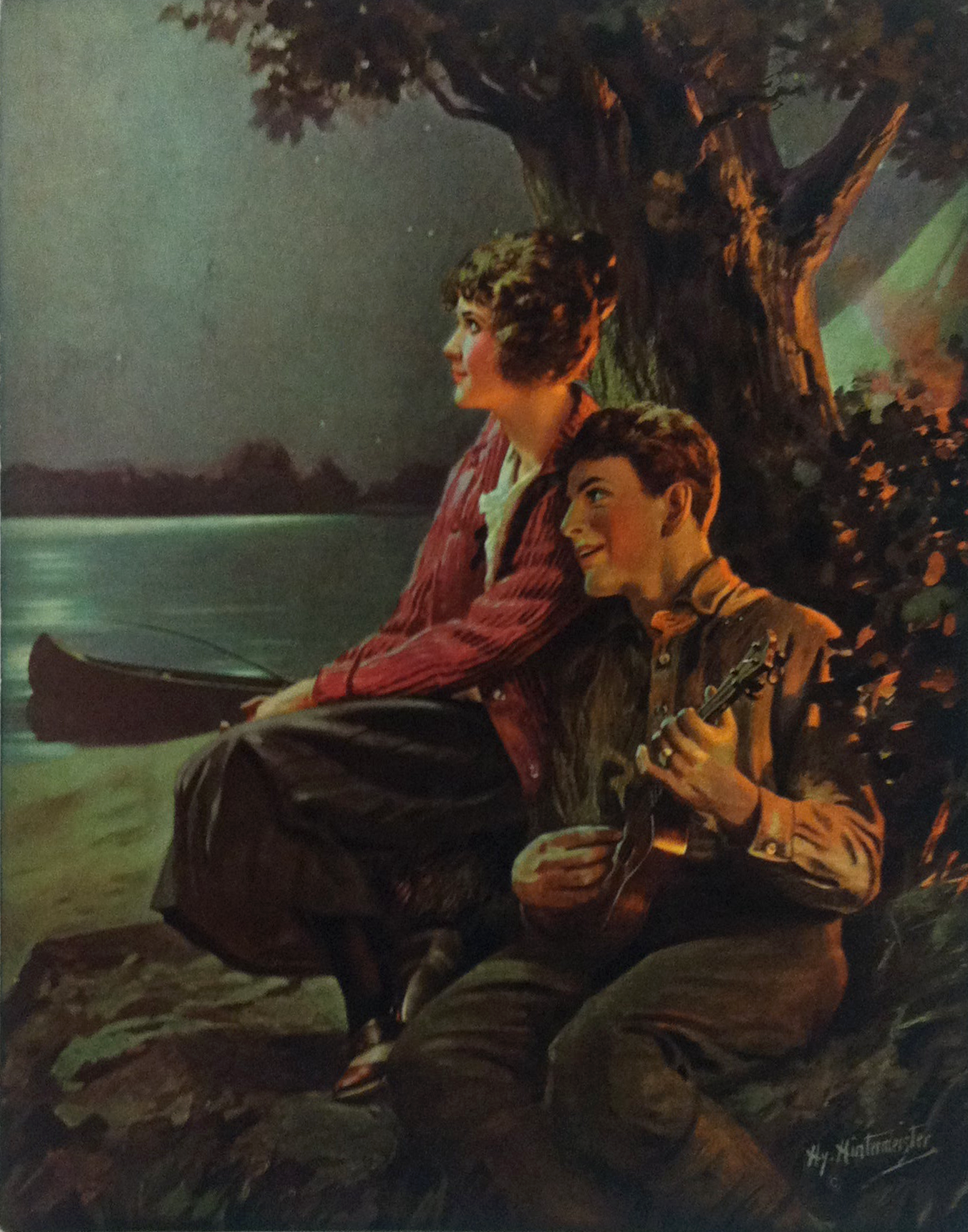
1923, Old, Old Story, a young man plays ukulele for a young woman.

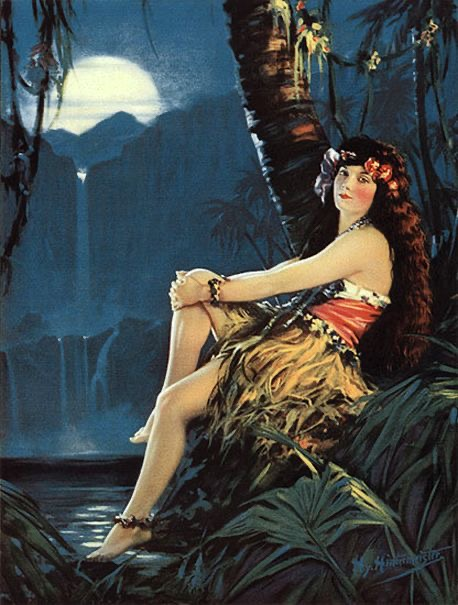
1923, South Sea Island idyll by Henry Hintermeister. Image partly from photo of Gilda Gray.

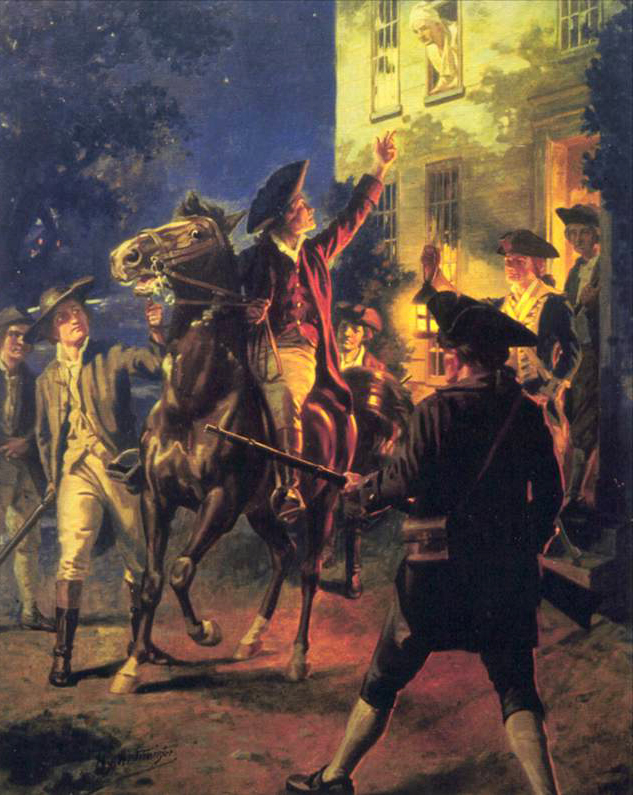
1924, Revere (Paul) arousing Hancock and Adams by Hy Hintermeister. Unclear if John Henry or Henry Hintermeister was creator.

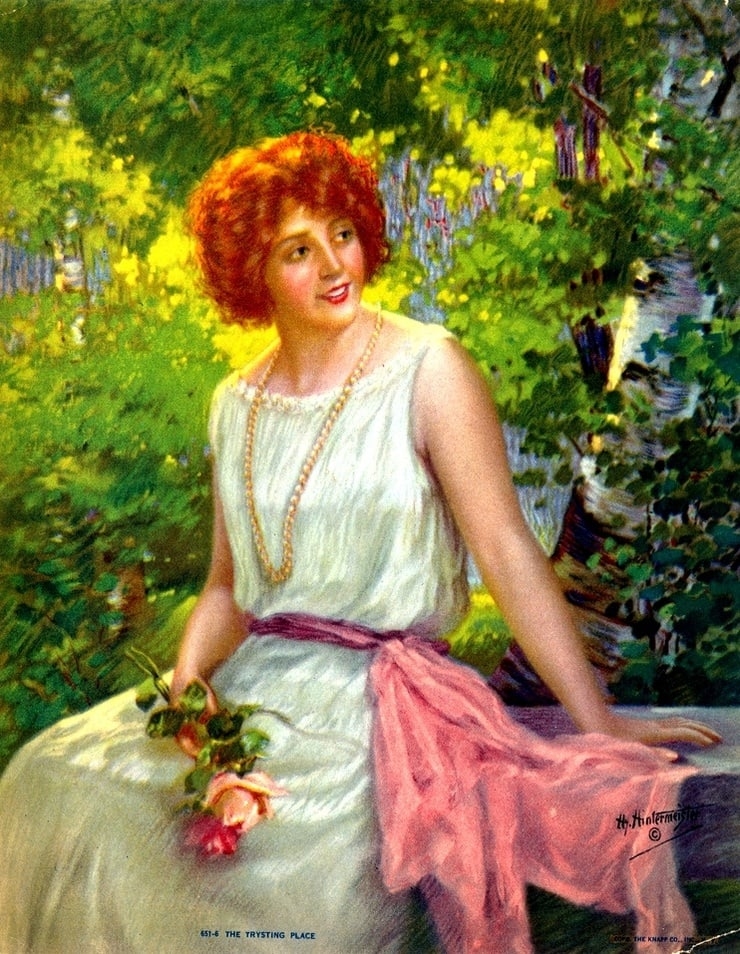
1924, Trysting Place by Henry Hintermeister

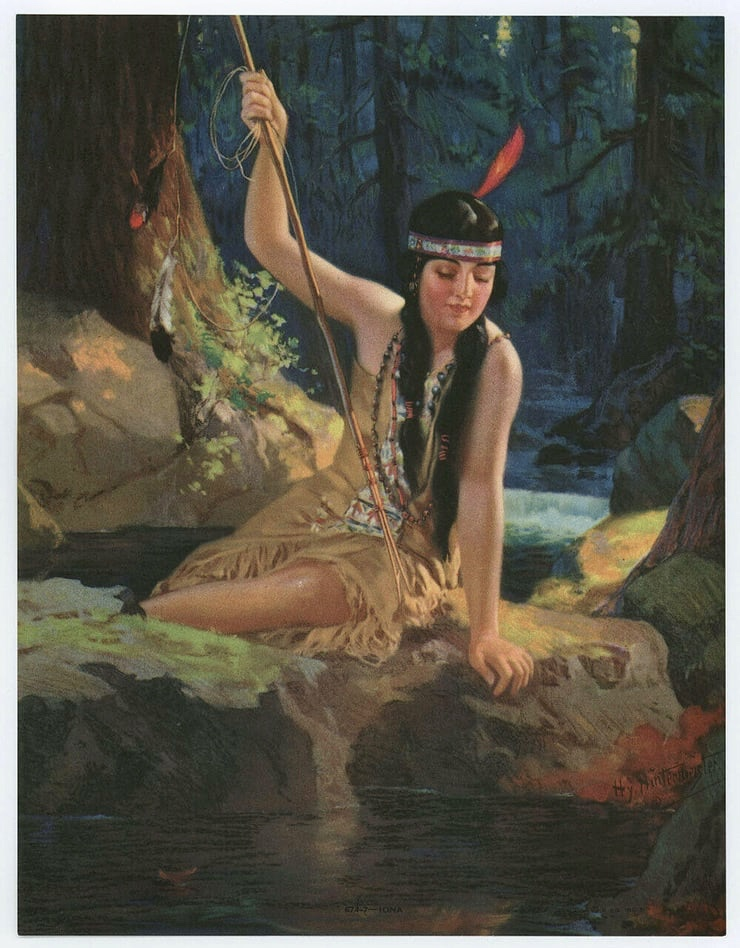
1925, Iona. Knapp company.

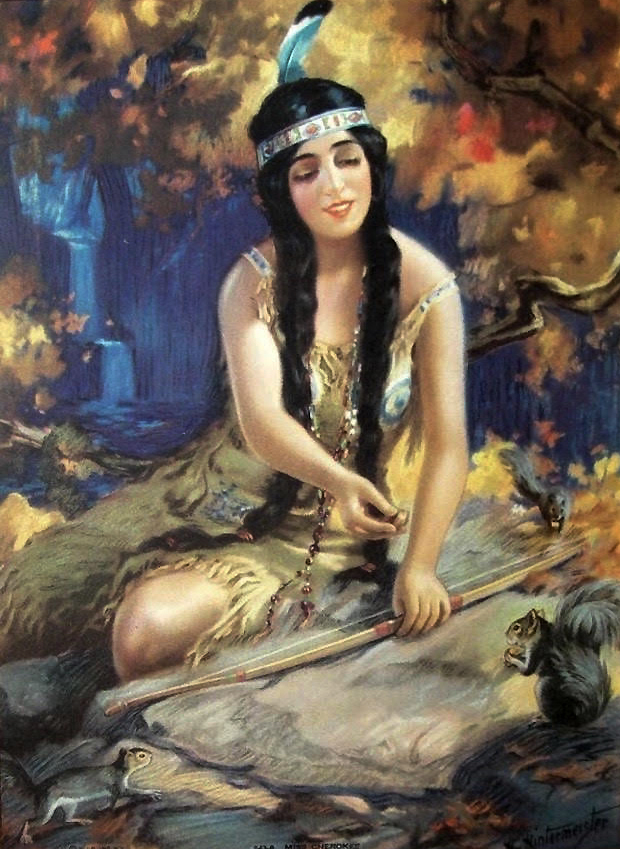
1927, Miss Cherokee. Knapp company. Painted by Henry Hintermeister.

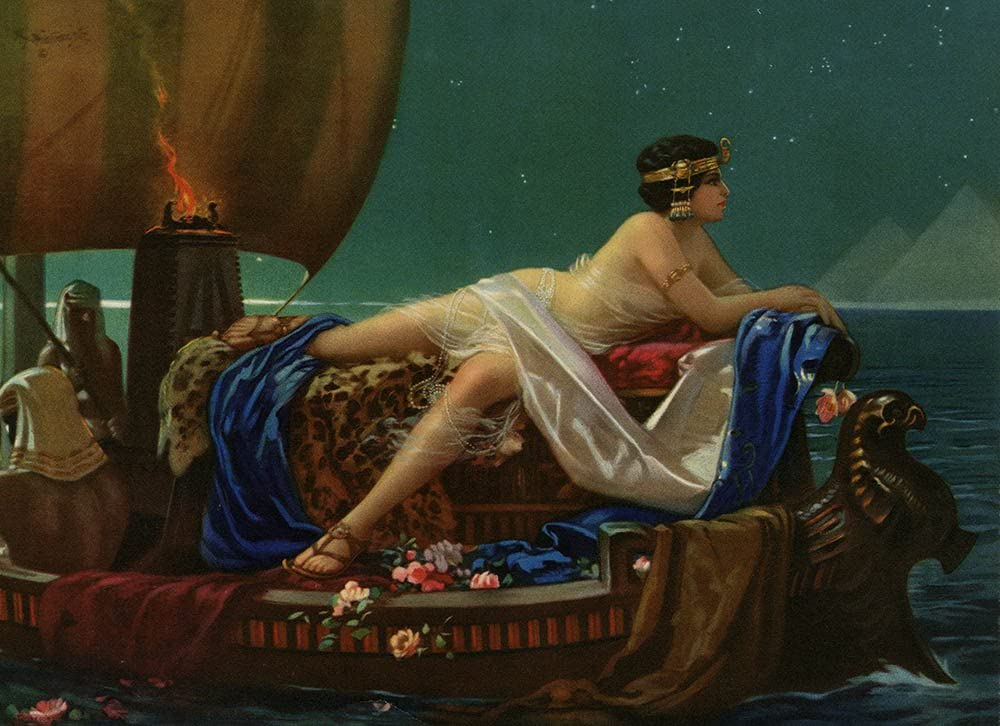
1927, Siren of the Nile.

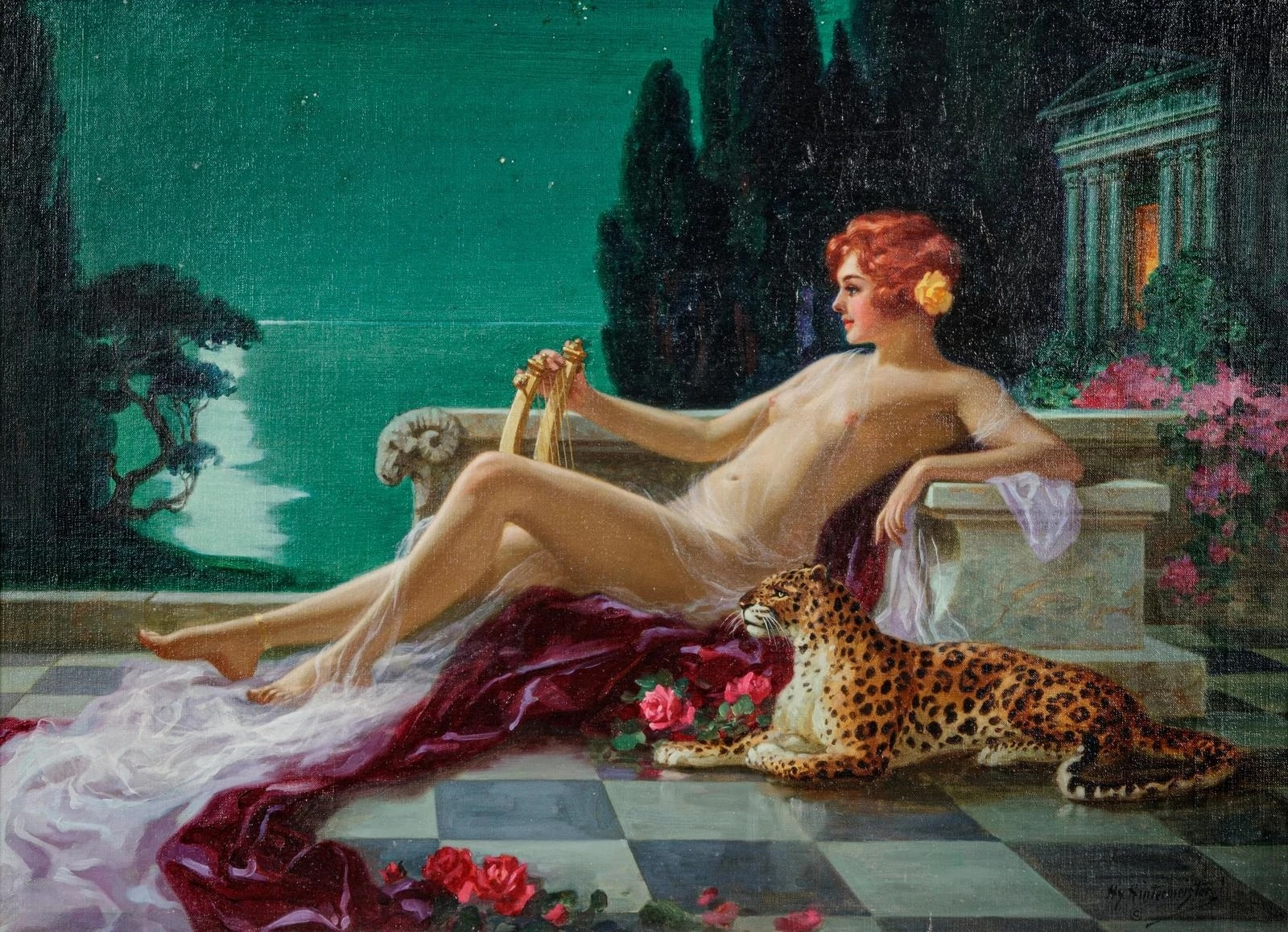
1928, Beauty of Ancient Rome or Helen of Troy by Henry Hintermeister

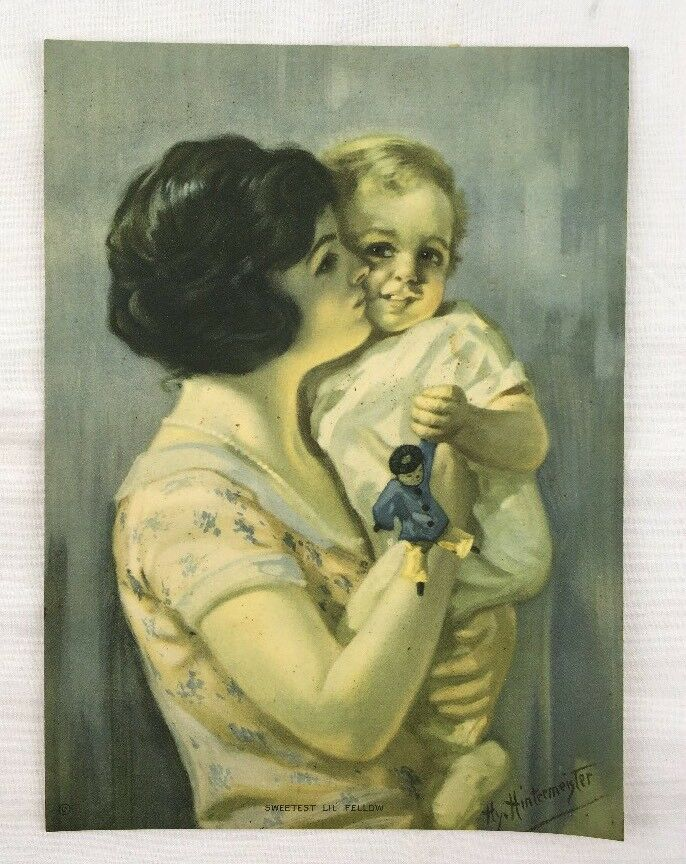
1929, Sweetest Lil' Fellow by Henry Hintermeister.

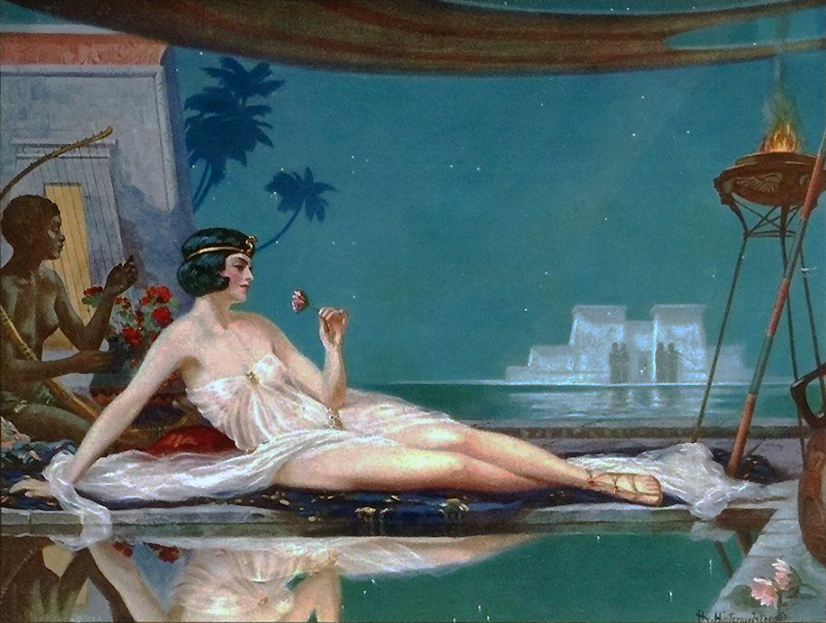
1931, Queen of the Temple of Isis in the Land Where the Lotus Blooms. Kemper Thomas company.

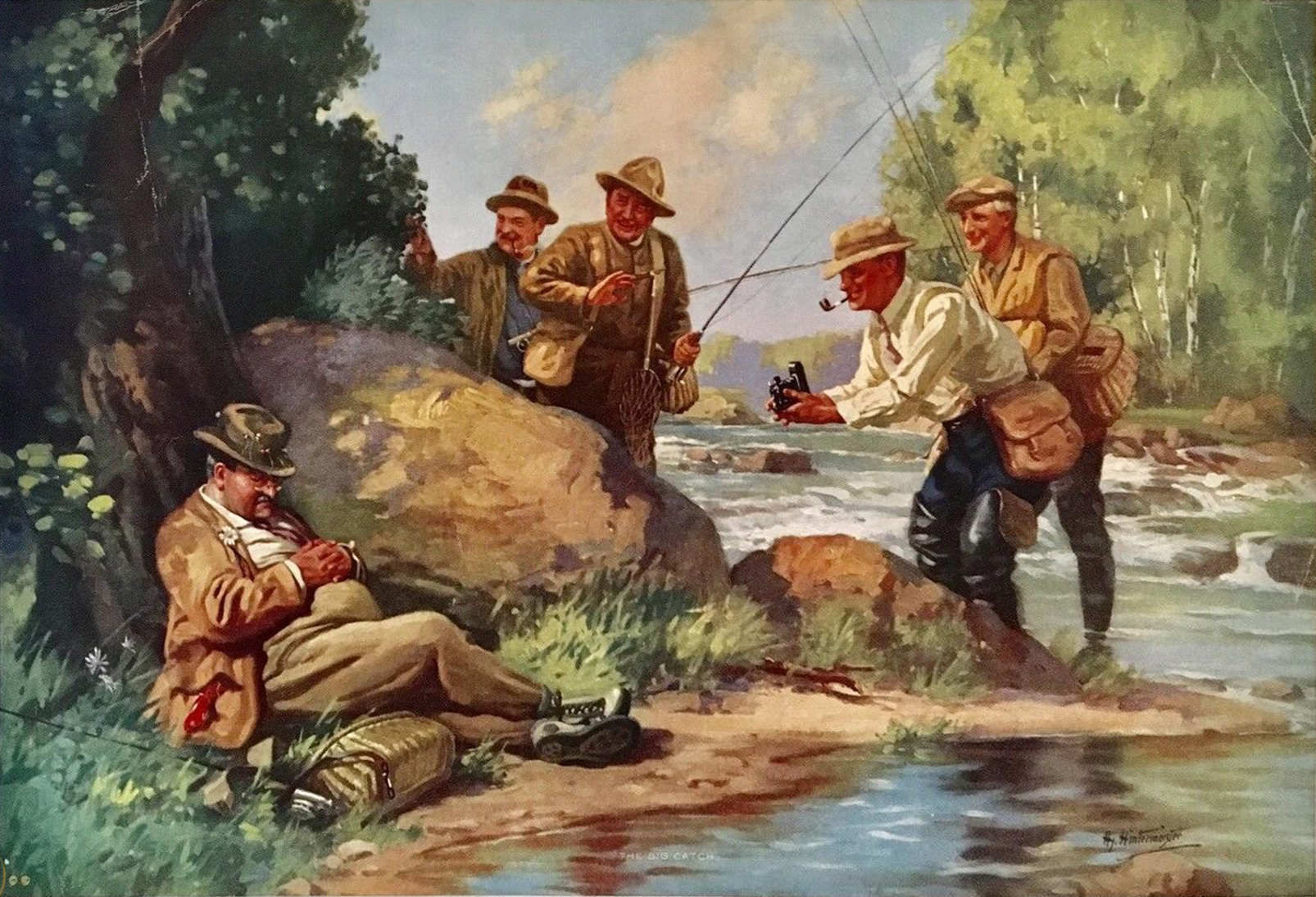
1933, The Big Catch

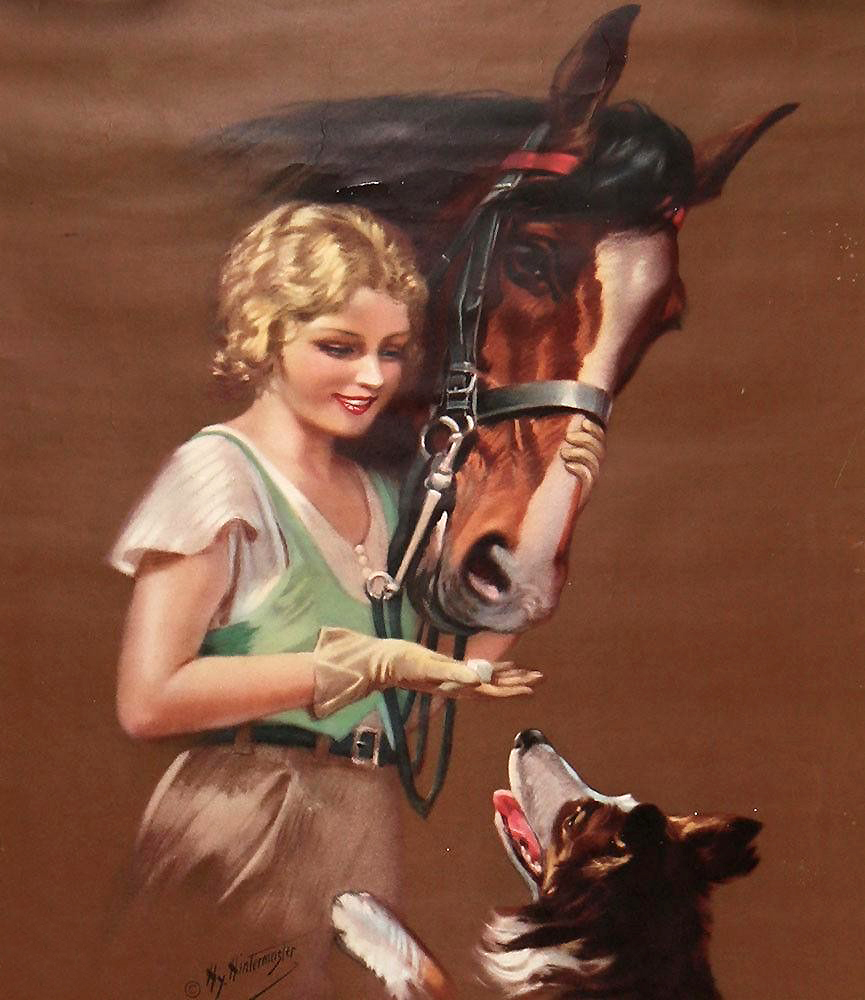
1933, Thoroughbreds by Hy Hintermeister. Not clear which painter painted the image.

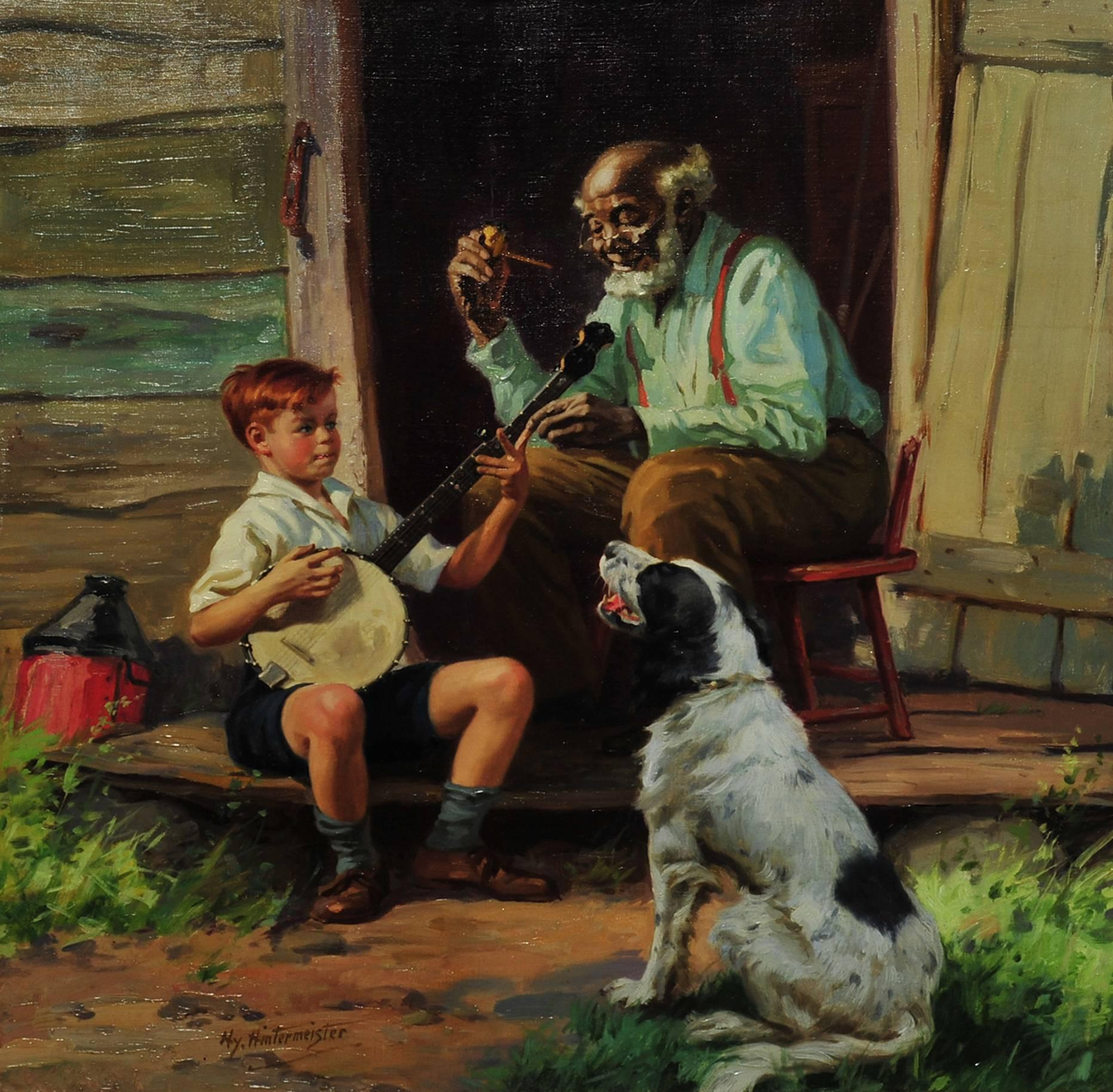
1934, Jes' Act Nat'chel, Sonny by Henry Hintermeister, published as calendar print by Osborne company. First of the Uncle Natchel paintings.

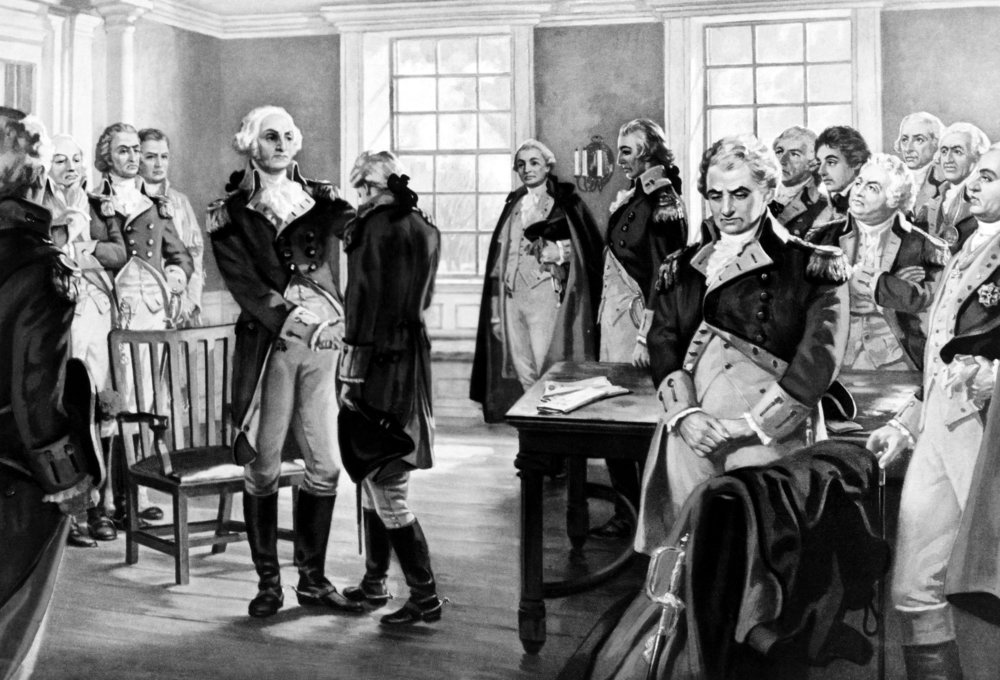
1939, George Washington says farewell to his troops at Fraunces Tavern, New York, 1783 by Henry Hintermeister

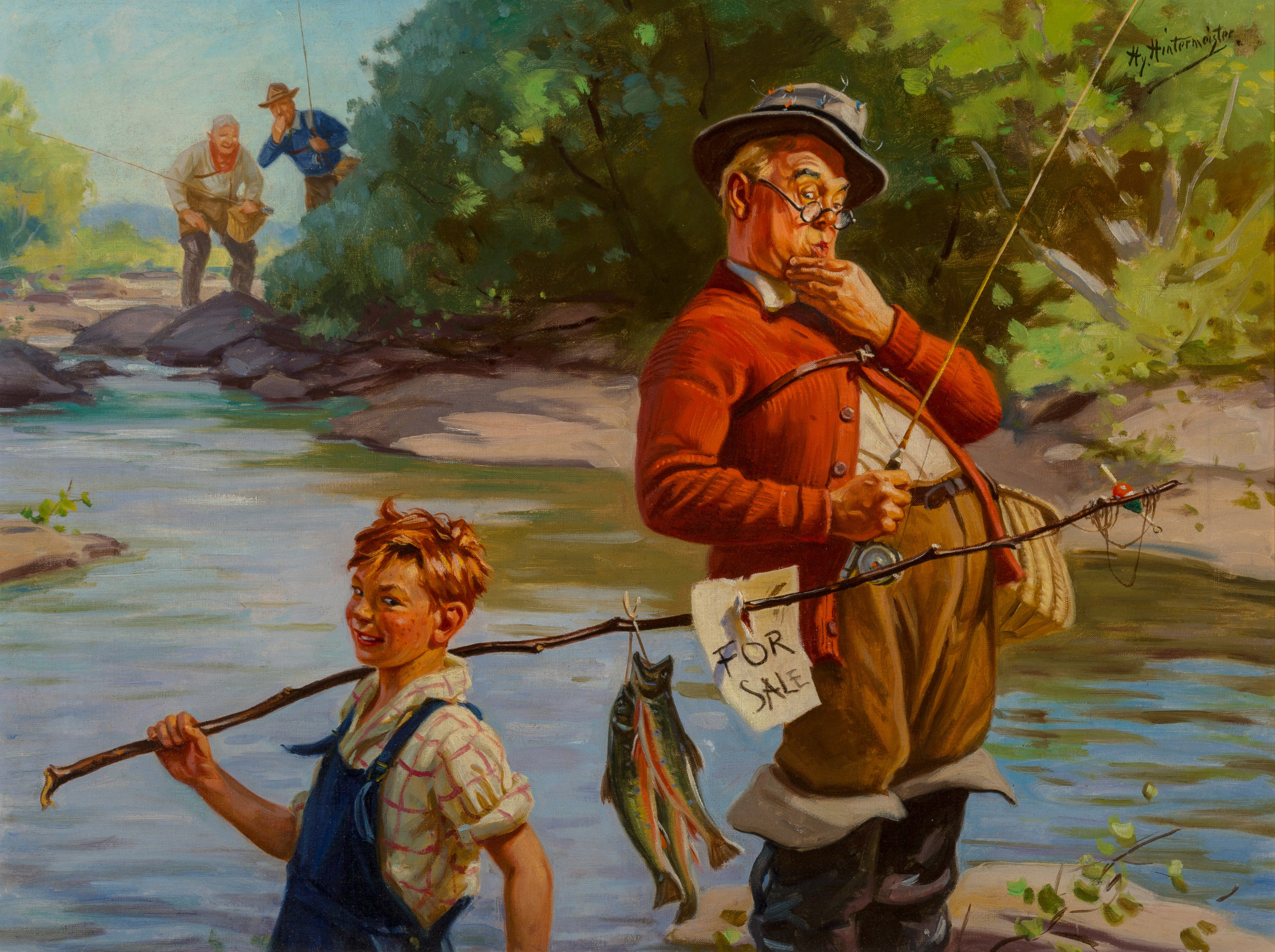
1949, When Skill Pays Off, painting by Henry Hintermeister.

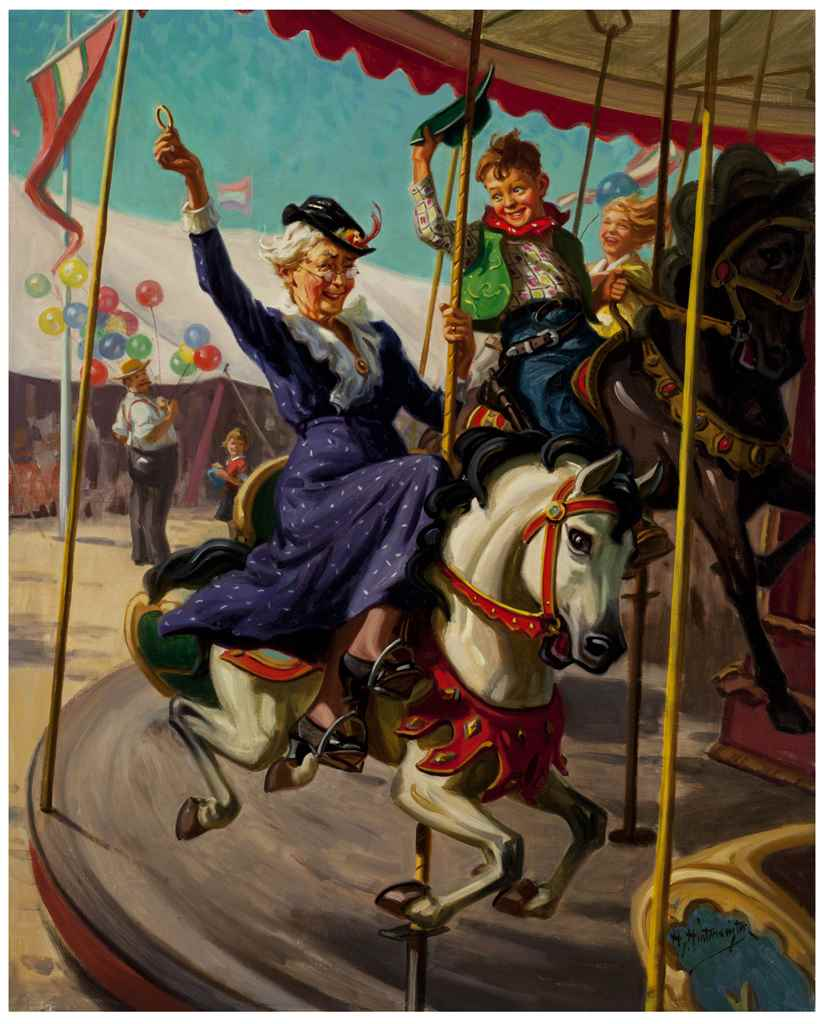
1953, Grandma Gets the Brass Ring. Hintermeister, Henry J.)

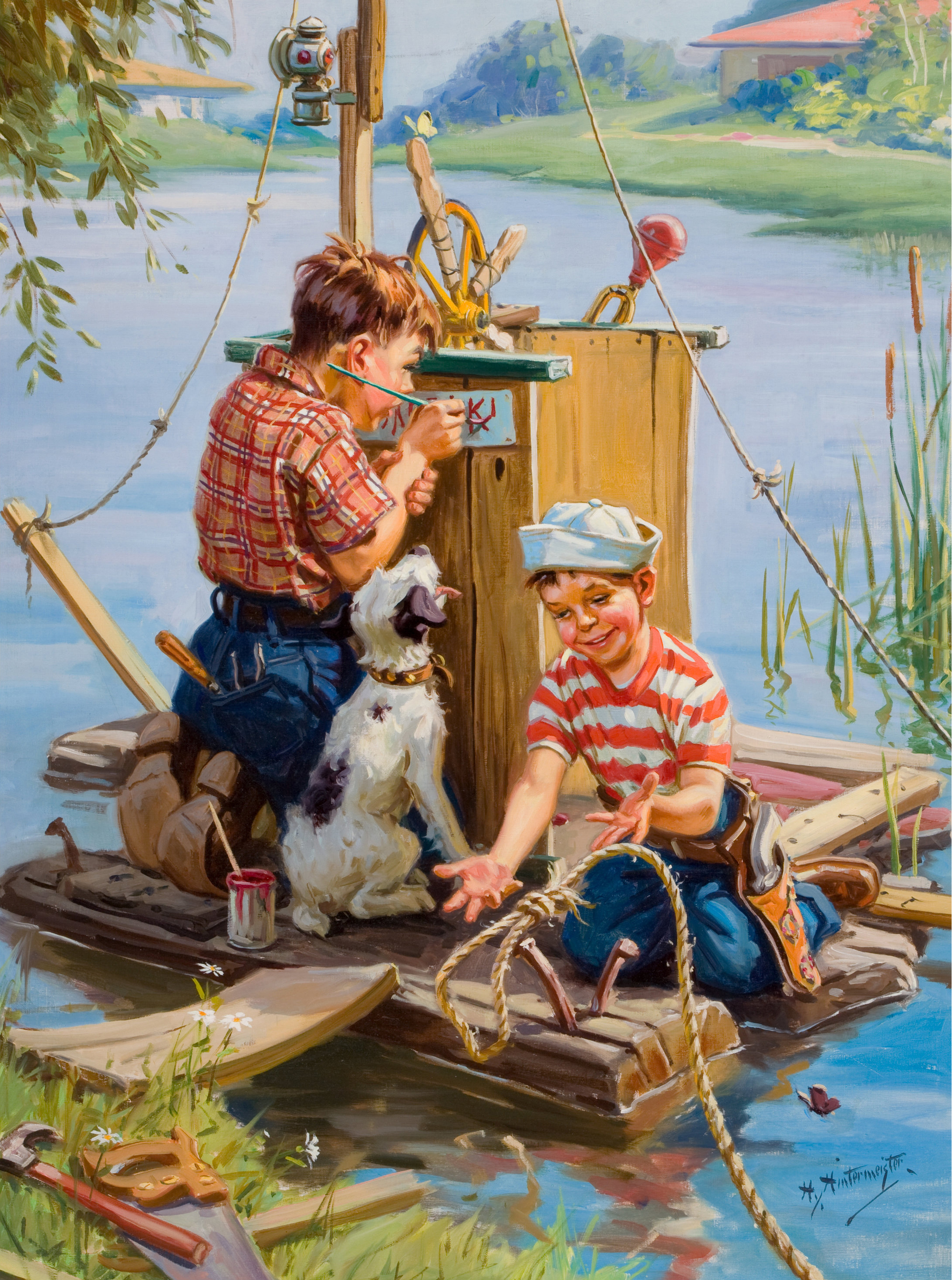
1956, Built for Adventure
