= Hy-V =

The Hy-V Scramjet Flight Experiment is a research project being led by the University of Virginia, the goal of which is to better understand dual-mode scramjet combustion by analyzing and comparing wind tunnel and flight data. The work is being conducted with industrial, academic and government collaborators.

== Overview ==
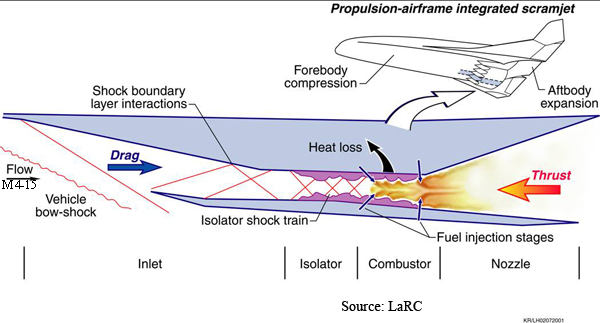
Schematic of a dual-mode scramjet indicating engine processes and components. Source: NASA Langley

The goal of the Hy-V project is to conduct a flight experiment of a scramjet engine at Mach 5 using a sounding rocket. Currently the project is in its design and test phase and plans to launch a flight test in the future. In a dual-mode scramjet, combustion can either occur at subsonic or supersonic speeds, or a mixture of the two. The experiment will be performed at speed of Mach 5 because significant effects on mode transition occur at this speed. In this particular case, the mode transition will occur inside the scramjet when the vehicle's airspeed reaches Mach 5. Teams of students, both undergraduate and graduate, and faculty from the member universities of the Virginia Space Grant Consortium are involved in the project and are collaborating with aerospace industry, NASA, and the Department of Defense.

=== Payload Design ===
The current payload design will enable researchers to conduct two separate experiments by having two separate scramjet ducts. One will resemble the geometry of the University of Virginia's supersonic wind tunnel and the other will be a variation of this geometry. The data recorded while in-flight will be used to better understand dual-mode scramjet (DMSJ) combustion and to make better numerical methods of predicting mode-transition processes. It will also provide a set of comparative data to help understand and isolate differences with wind tunnel data.

=== UVA Wind Tunnel ===
The University of Virginia's Supersonic wind tunnel was built in the late 1980s inside the Aerospace Research Laboratory (ARL). Previously housing classified gas centrifuge research, the ARL became endorsed purely for research by the National Space Council in 1989. Shortly thereafter, the wind tunnel was constructed in order to aid in the development of the National Aero-Space Plane, also known as the X-30, which was projected to fly at Mach 25. The wind tunnel is not only known for its supersonic combustion capabilities, but also for its unique design. The air is heated electrically, rather than through combustion processes, thus eliminating contaminants introduced by combustion. Additionally, the wind tunnel is capable of operating for an indefinite period of time, allowing unlimited duration scramjet testing.

In order to recreate the conditions inside the DMSJ combustor, the geometry of the experimental scramjet will be a full-scale copy of that of the DMSJ combustor.
