= John Henry Hintermeister =

American painter

- Johann Heinrich Hintermeister
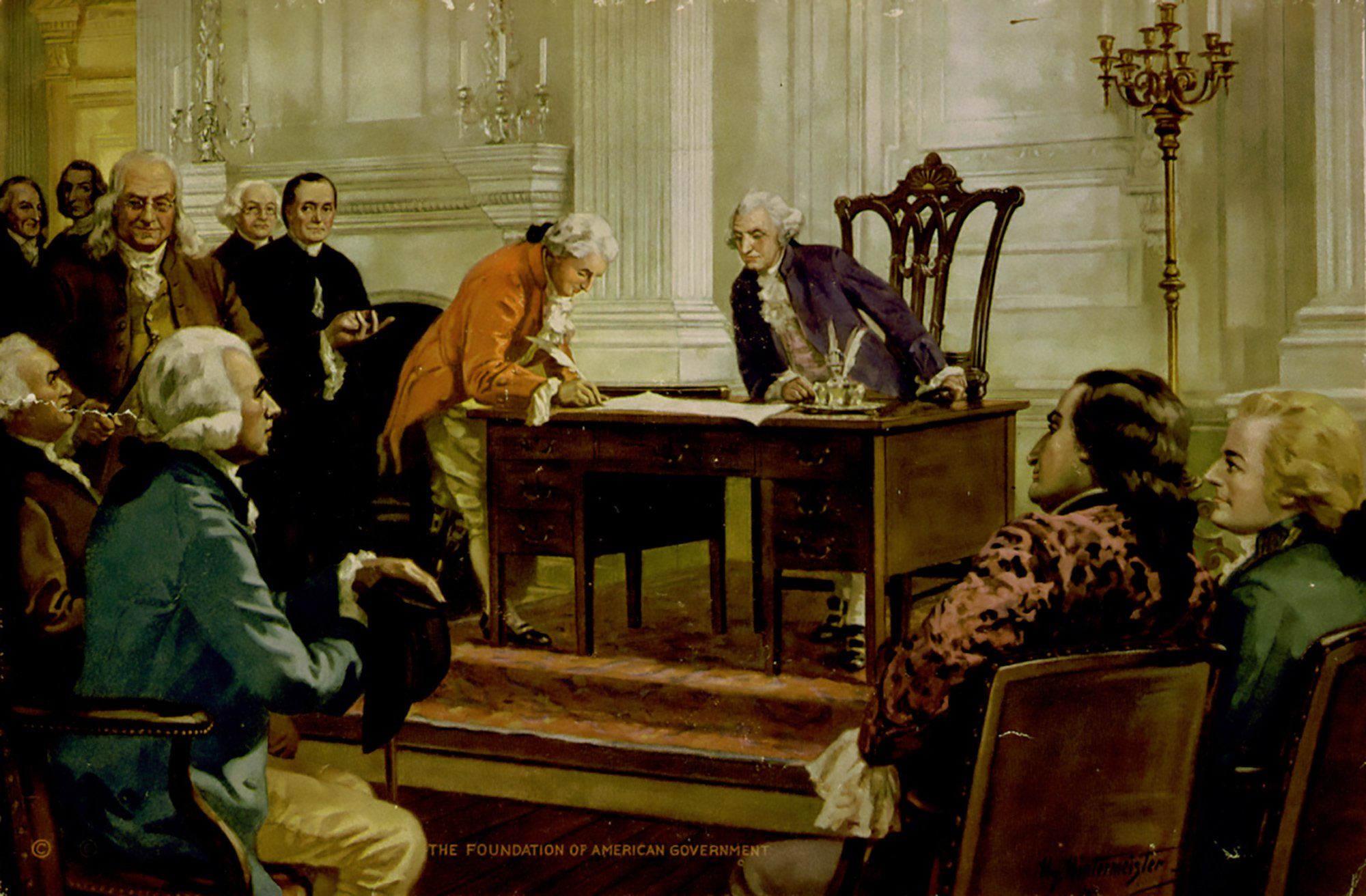
- Painting by John Henry Hintermeister, Foundation of American Government, 1925. At his desk, Washington sits watching Gouverneur Morris sign the Constitution; behind Morris are Roger Sherman, Benjamin Franklin, Robert Morris, Madison and others, and at right Hamilton and Randolph.
- Born: Johann Heinrich Hintermeister; October 10, 1869; Winterthur, Switzerland
- Died: February 10, 1945 (aged 75); Brooklyn, New York

John Henry Hintermeister (born Johann Heinrich Hintermeister; October 10, 1869 – February 10, 1945) was a Swiss-born American artist. He was a "well-known illustrator and a painter of American historical scenes," who created paintings for calendars and advertising illustration for the American Art Works company, Brown & Bigelow, Church and Dwight, Louis F. Dow, Kemper-Thomas, the Osborne Co., and Thomas D. Murphy. He was the father of another illustrator, Henry Hintermeister. Both men used the signature Hy Hintermeister, causing confusion among collectors. The two worked together, producing more than 1050 illustrations.

== Education and career ==
John Henry Hintermeister was born in Winterthur, Switzerland, and attended the University of Zurich. When his father August Friedrich Hintermeister immigrated to the United States, he remained in Switzerland to finish school, studying art. He turned down a professorship in Switzerland and a chance to teach, choosing instead to join his father in the United States in 1890. In the United States, he worked as a courtroom artist and as a commercial illustrator. After nearly dying in the Park Place Disaster in August 1891, in which the factory building he was working in collapsed, he stepped away from the in-factory lithography that he was doing at the time to "pursue his dreams."

He painted original art for the next 50 years, and had works given copyright in the 1946 registry. His subjects included "landscapes, people, humor, Native Americans, fishing and hunting scenes." His son joined him in the business by the early 1920s and the two worked together, producing artwork for calendars, safety posters, and advertising, with images including kids and dogs, the Boy Scouts of America, "Granny and Gramps" humor illustrations, fishing and hunting scenes.

He became one of the oldest members of the New York City Swiss Society and was "a member of the Salmagundi Club, the Brooklyn Society of Artists, and the Artists Professional League."

== Gallery ==
John Henry Hintermeister signed his paintings "Hy Hintermeister", the same as his son, but he would sometimes add his first initial, signing "J. Hy. Hintermeister."

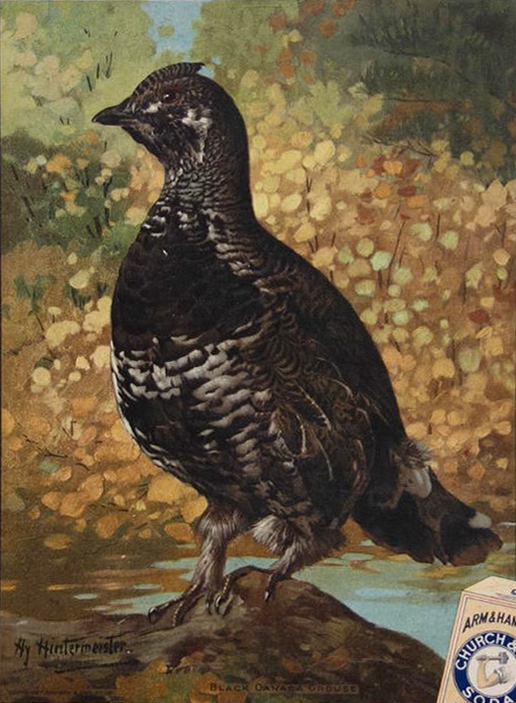
1908, Black Canada Grouse. Published by Church and Dwight.

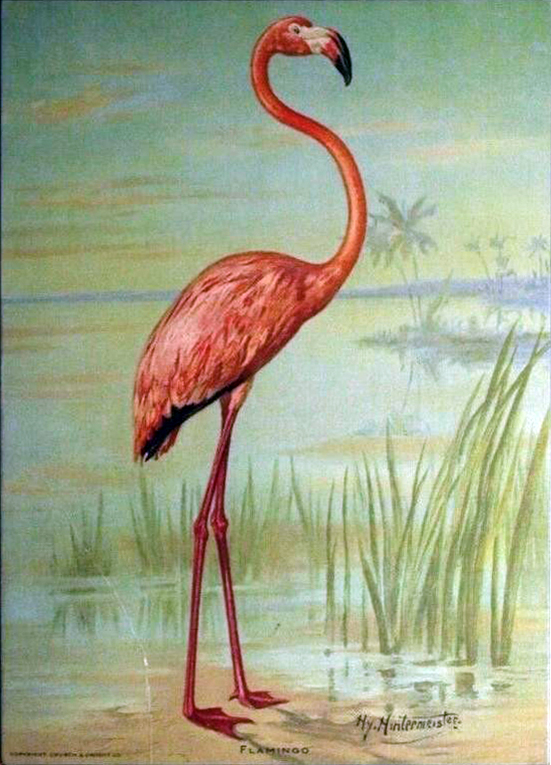
1908, Flamingo, by John Henry Hintermeister. Published by Church and Dwight.

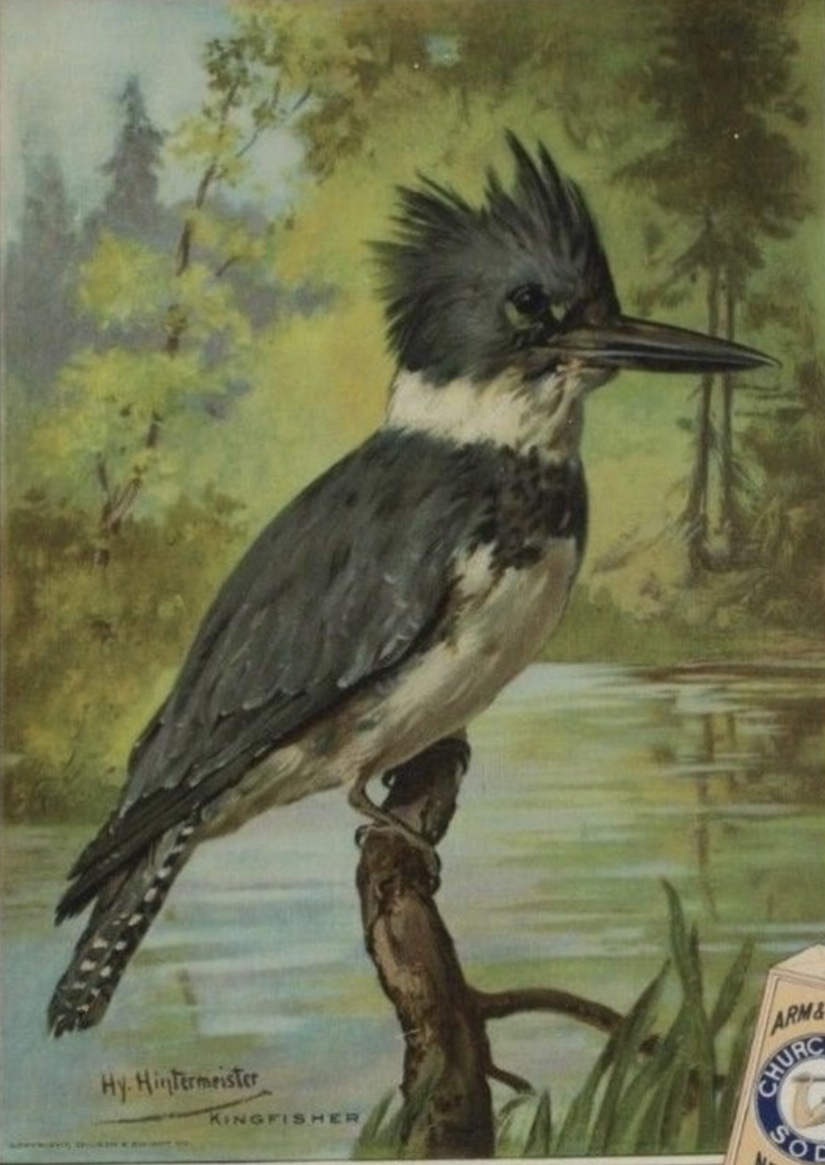
1908, Kingfisher. Published by Church and Dwight.

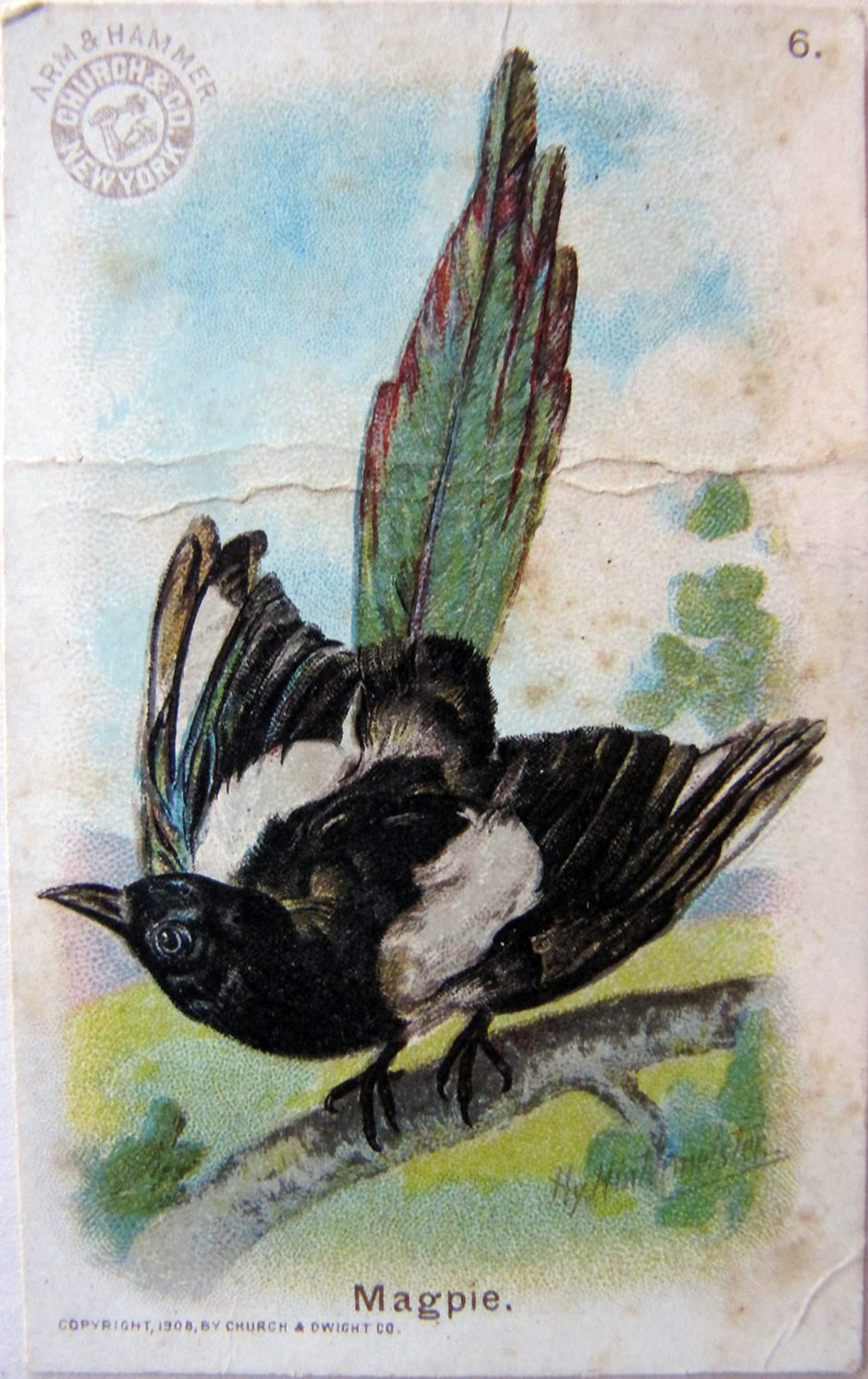
1908, Magpie, by John Henry Hintermeister. Published by Church and Dwight.

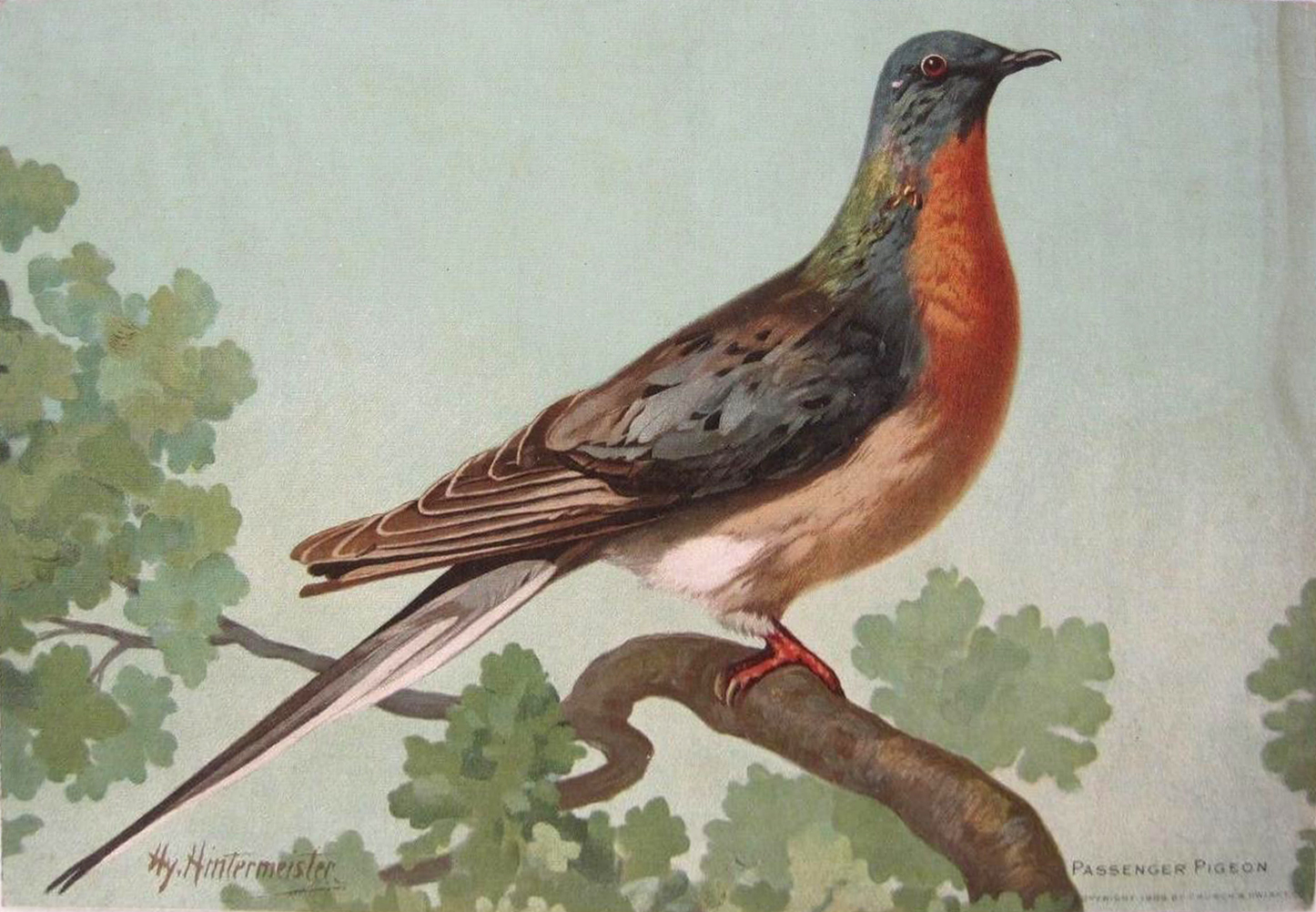
1908, Passenger pigeon by John Henry Hintermeister. Published by Church and Dwight.

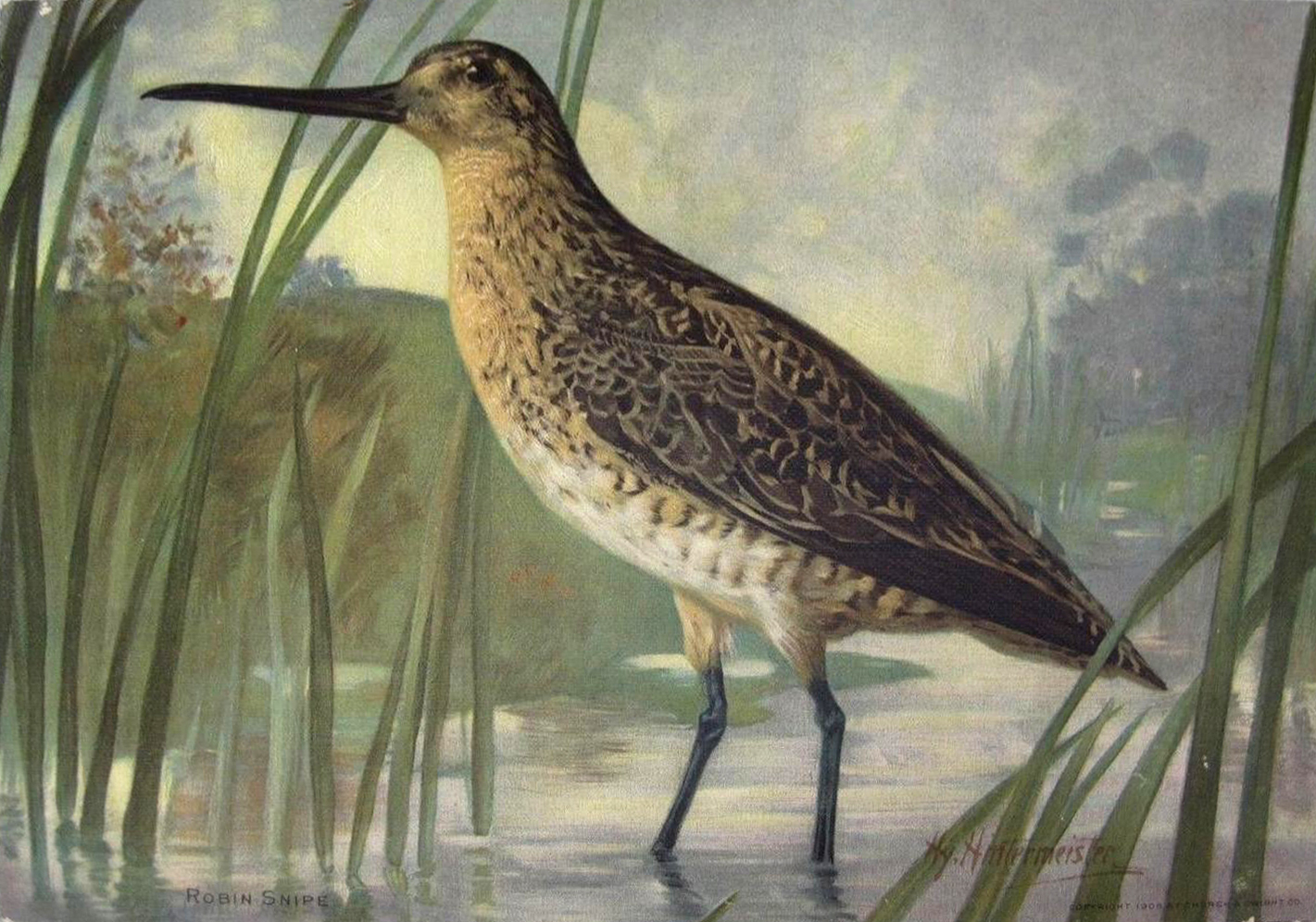
1908, Robin snipe by John Henry Hintermeister. Published by Church and Dwight.

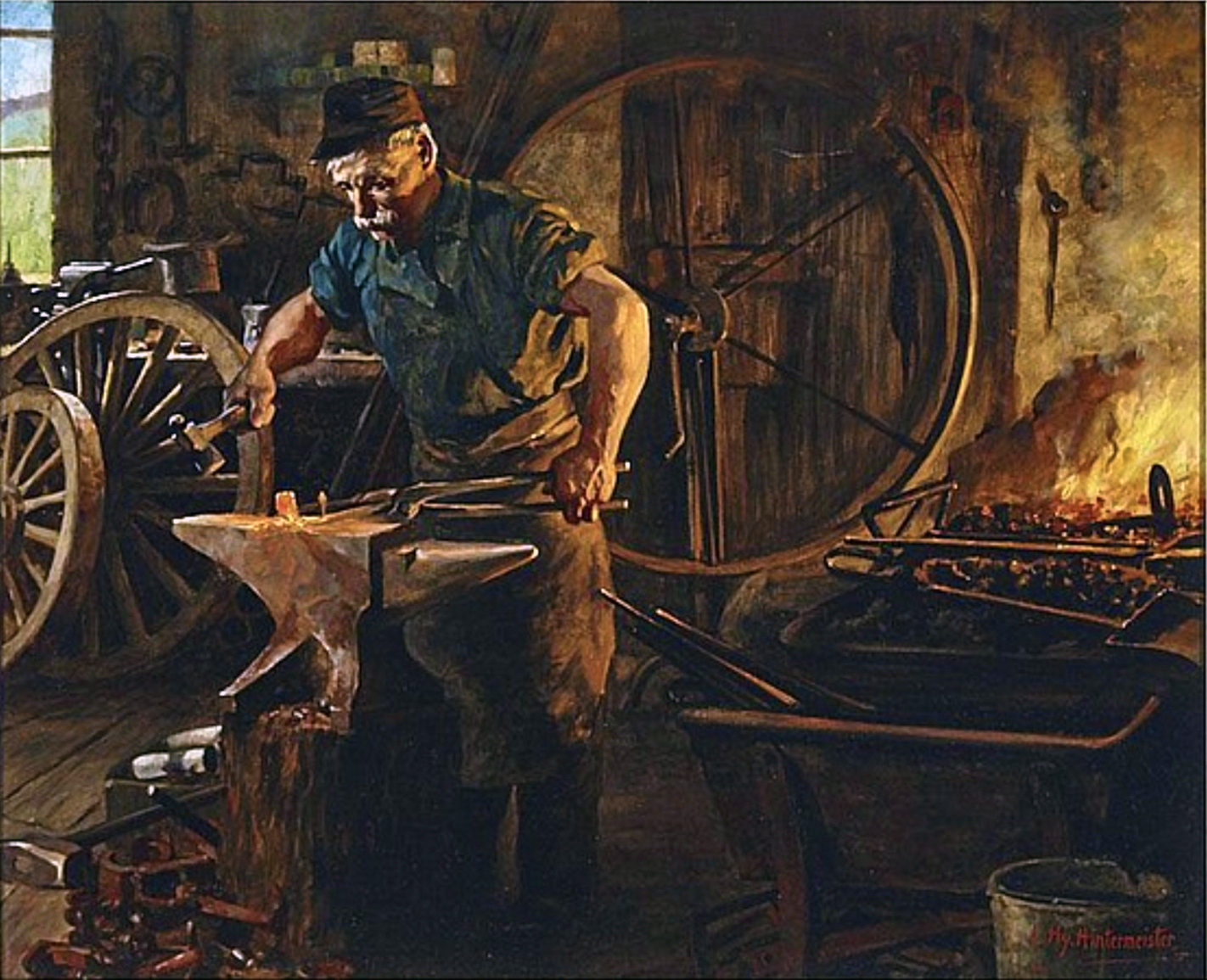
1908, Village Blacksmith, by John Henry Hintermeister

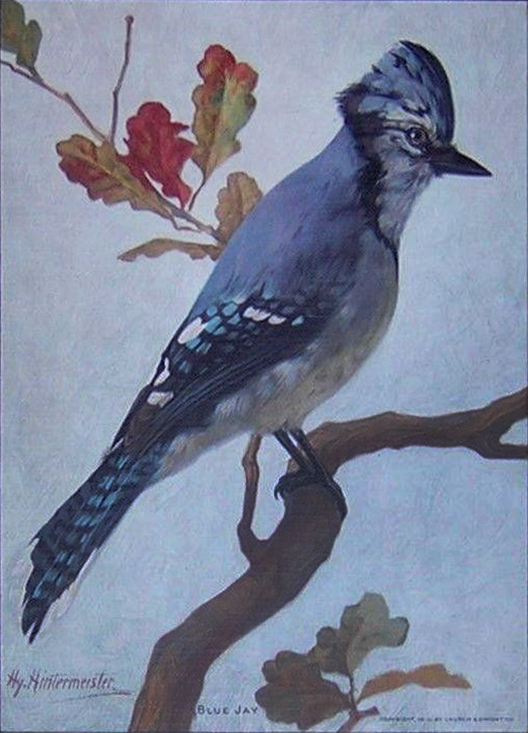
1910, Blue Jay by John Henry Hintermeister. Published by Church and Dwight.

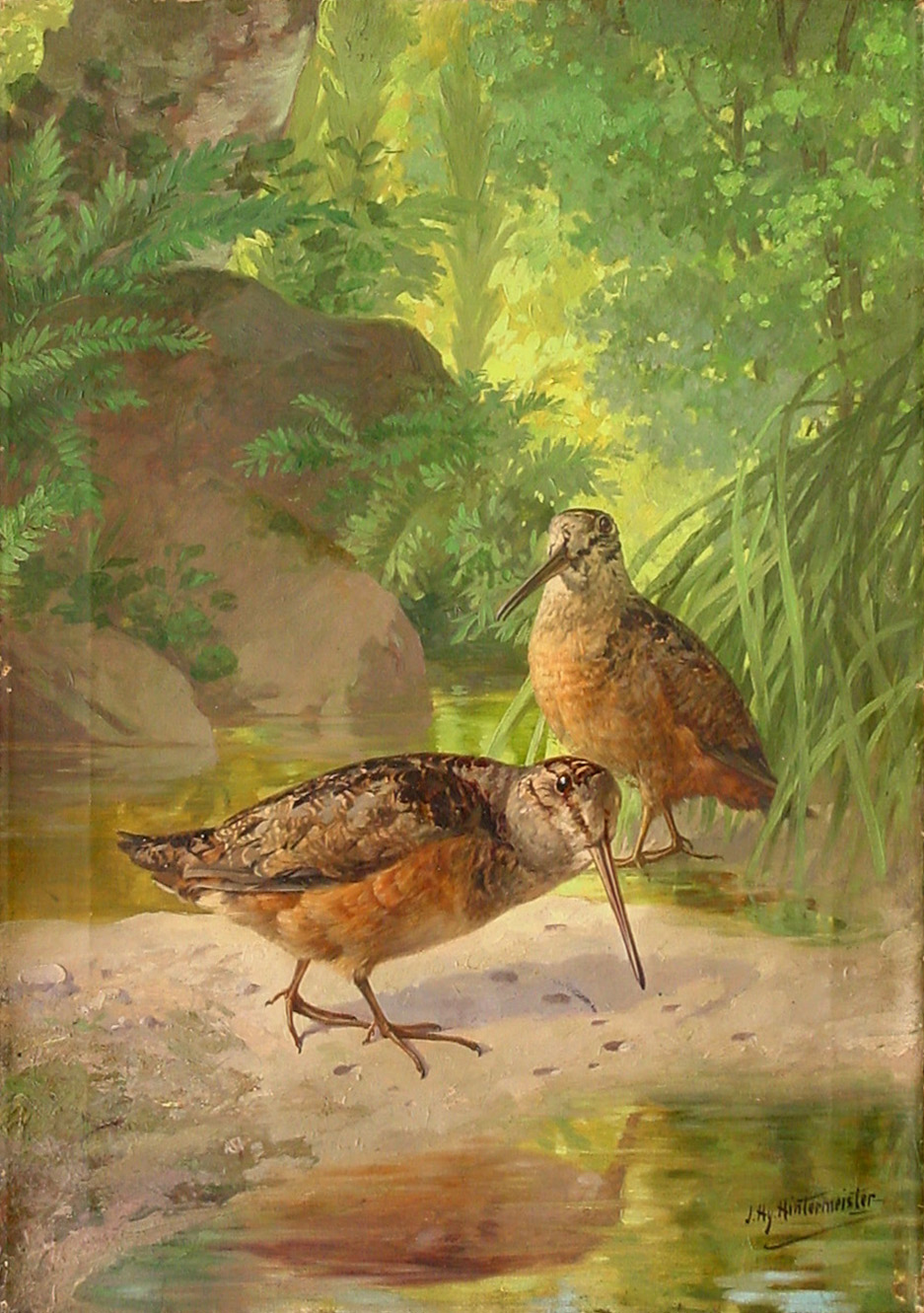
1910, Woodcocks Feeding, by John Henry Hintermeister. Published by Church and Dwight.

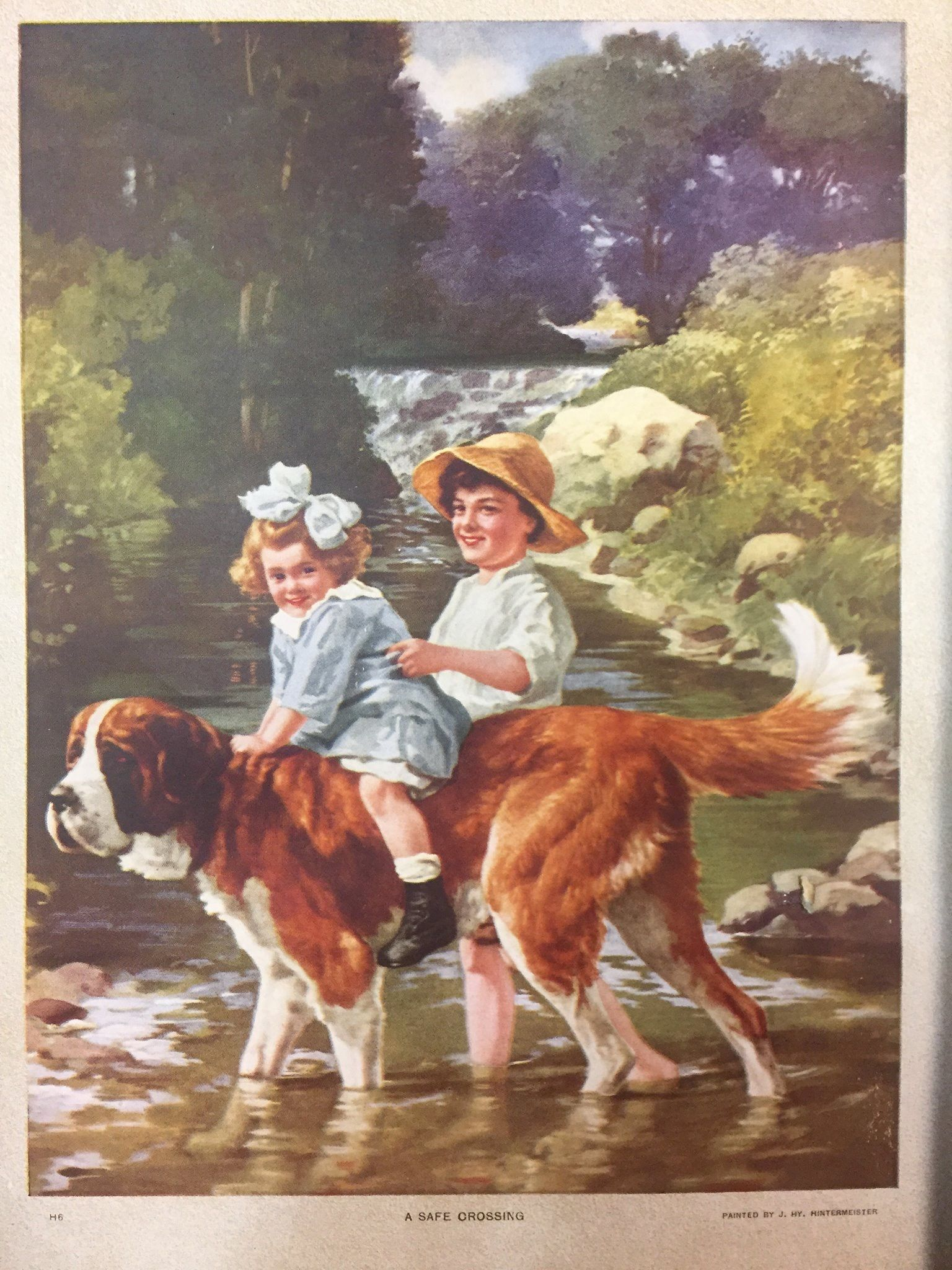
1917, A Safe Crossing by John Henry Hintermeister

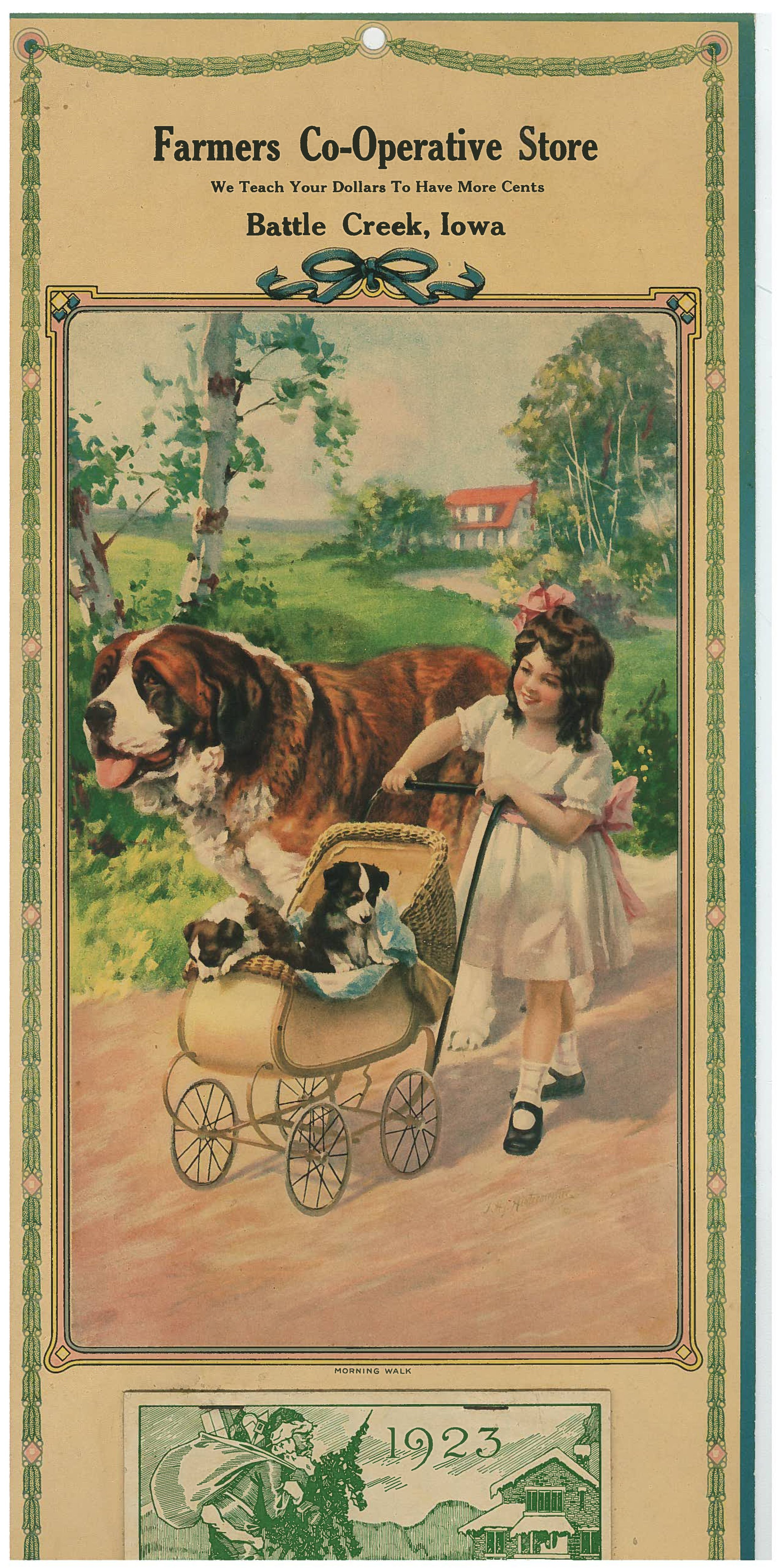
1923, Morning Walk by John Henry Hintermeister

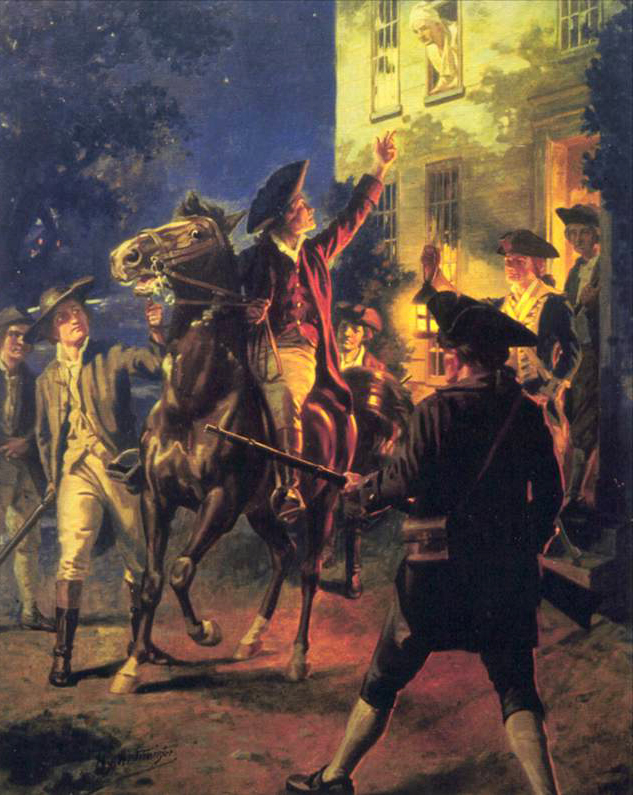
1924, Revere (Paul) arousing Hancock and Adams by Hy Hintermeister. Unclear if John Henry or Henry Hintermeister was creator.

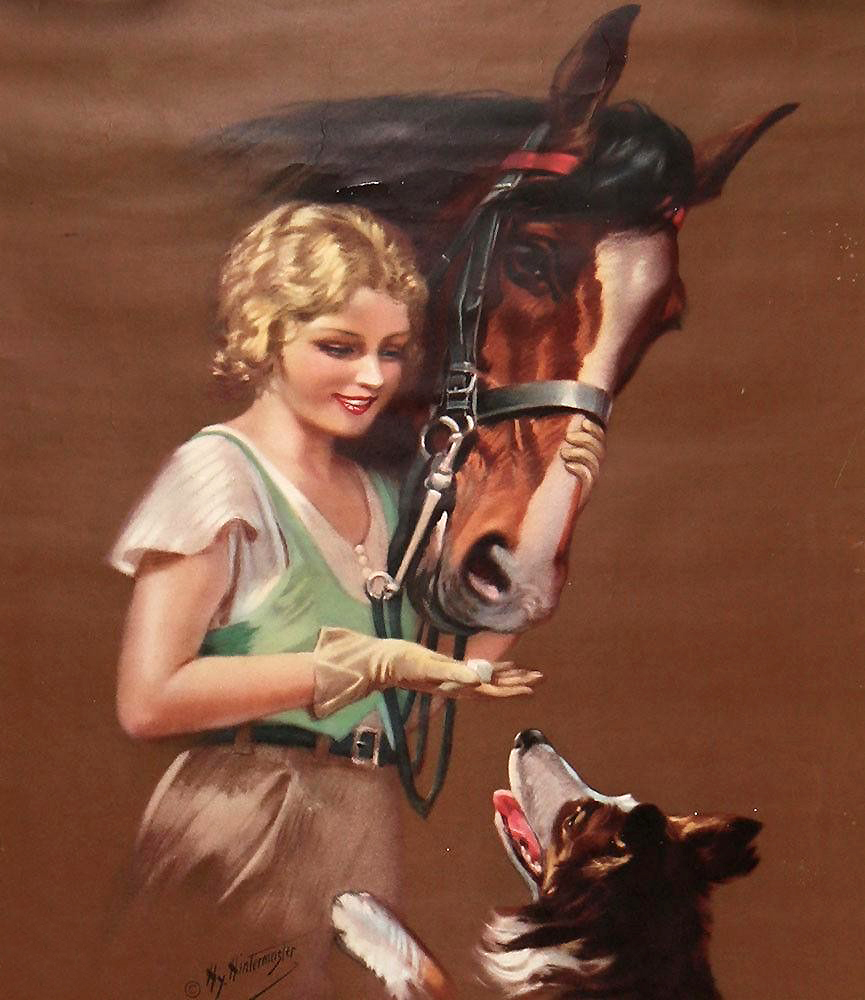
1933, Thoroughbreds by Hy Hintermeister. Not clear which painter created the image.

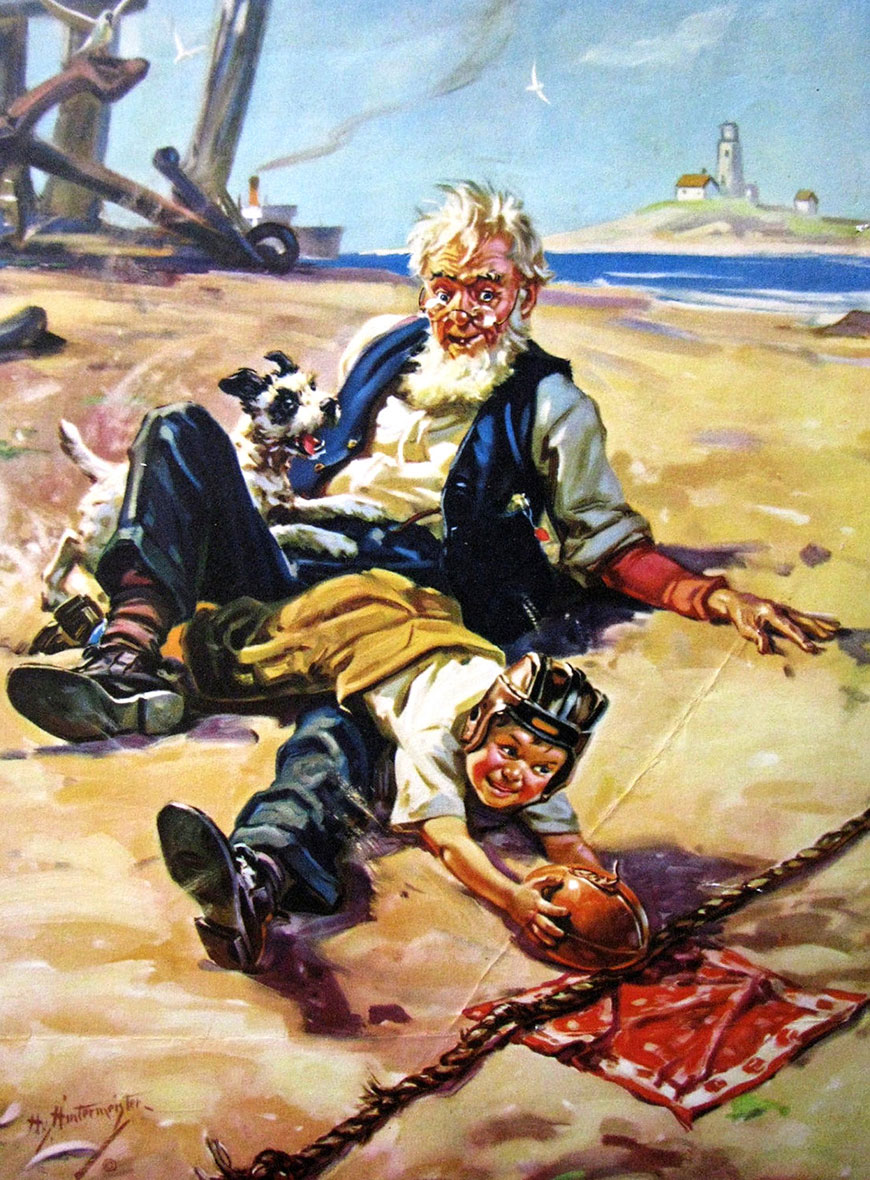
1936, Touchdown by John Henry Hintermeister

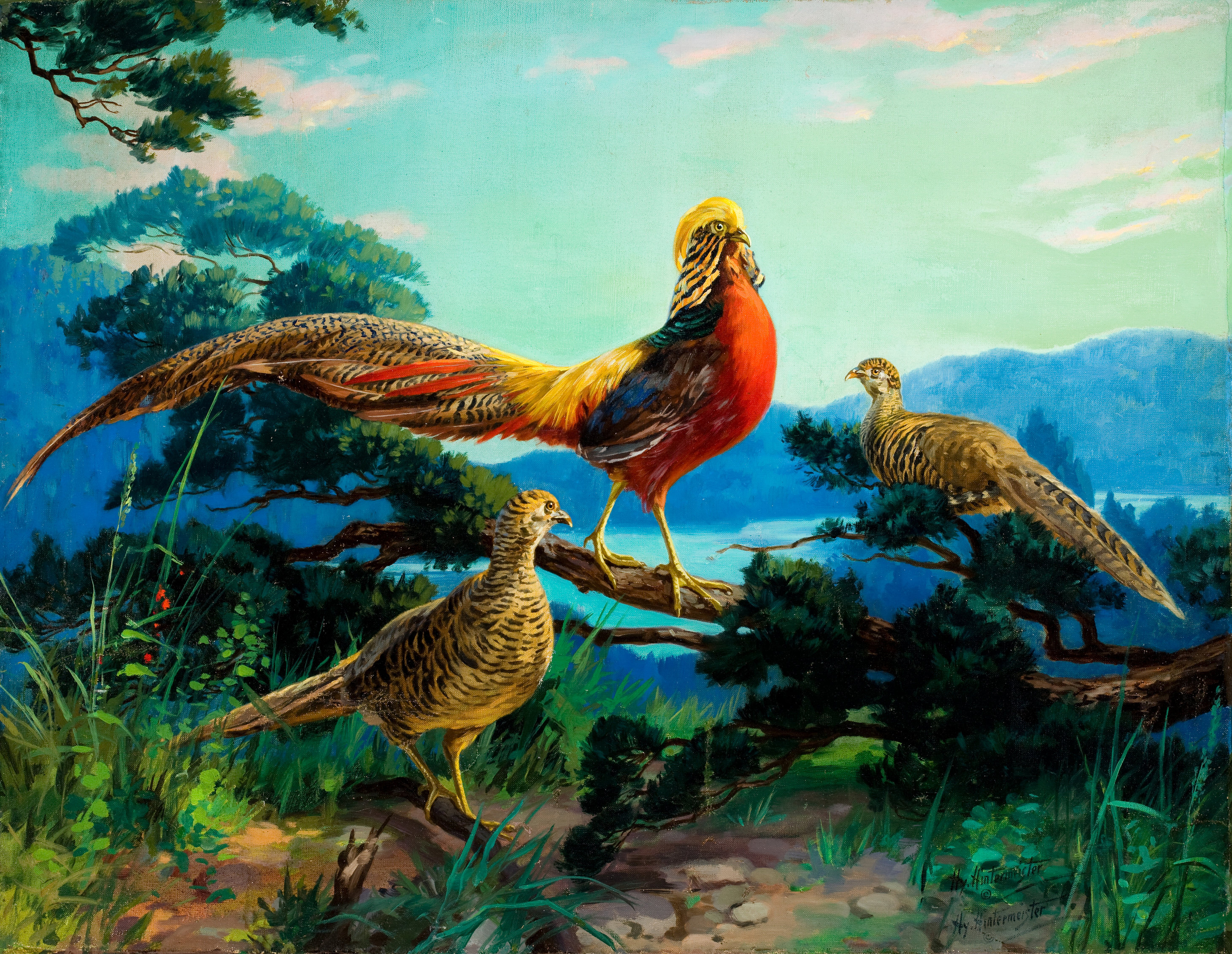
1938, Golden Pheasants by John Henry Hintermeister

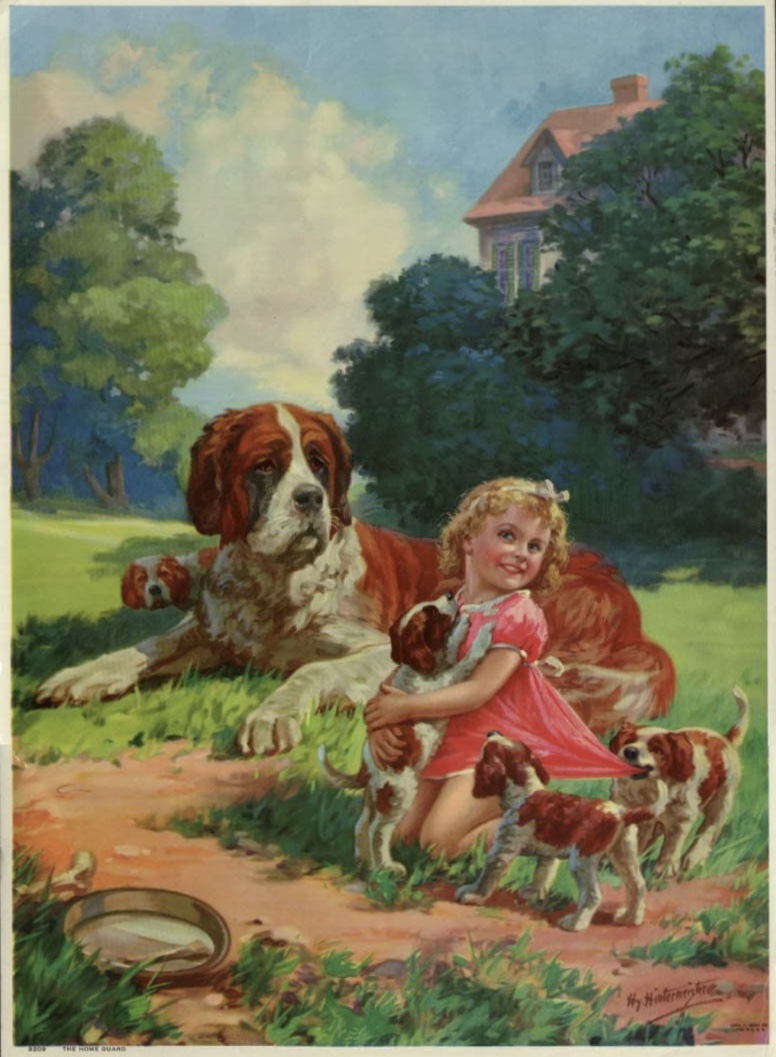
1941,The Home Guard

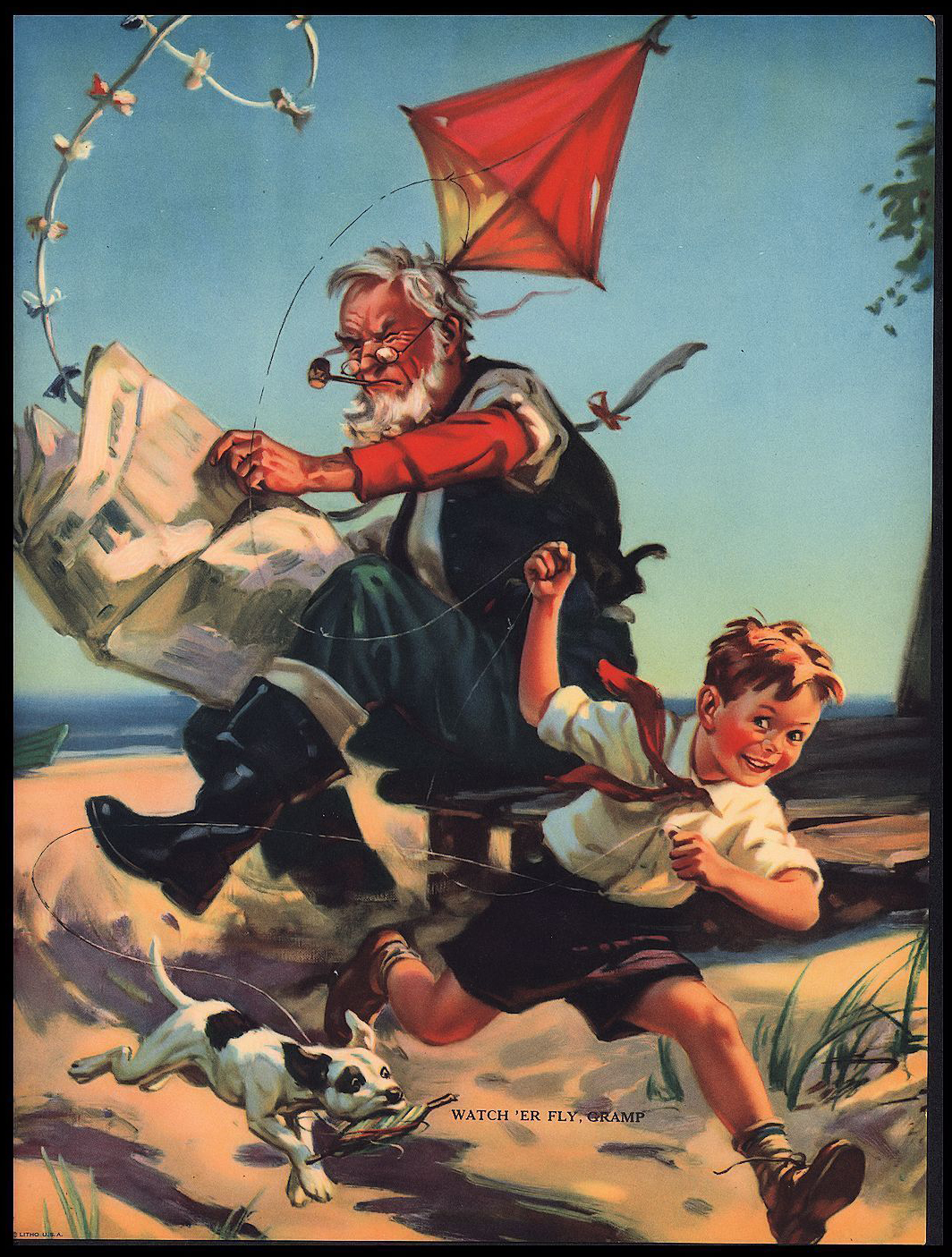
1941, Watch 'er fly, Gramp

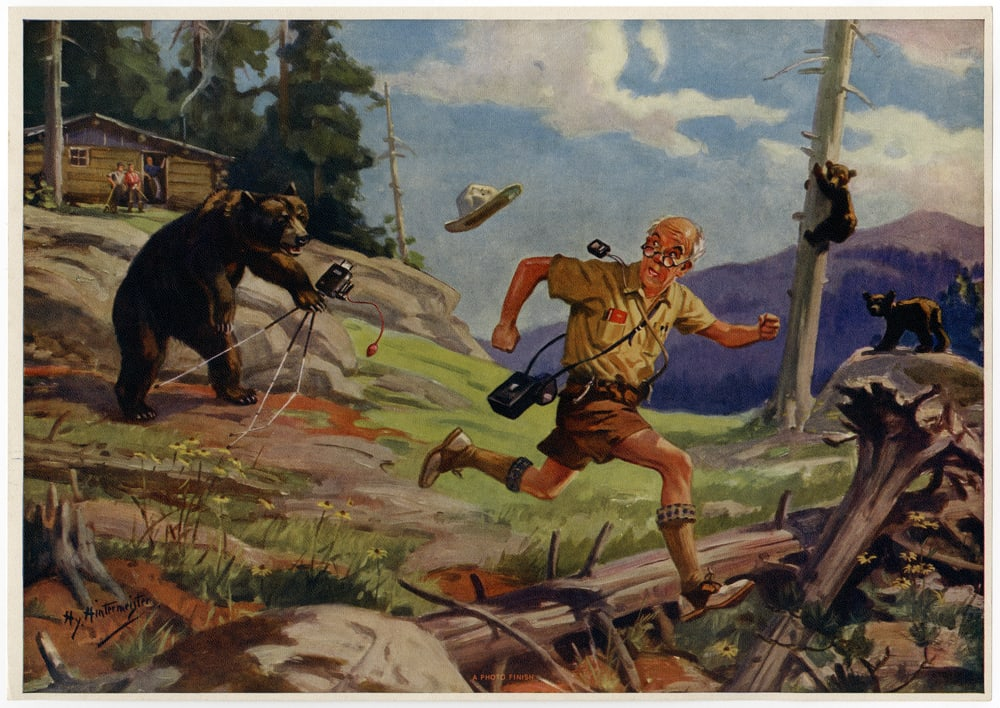
1942, A Photo Finish by John Henry Hintermeister. Example of work using the same "Hy Hintermeister" that his son used. The copyright registration made it clear that this was John Henry Hintermeister.

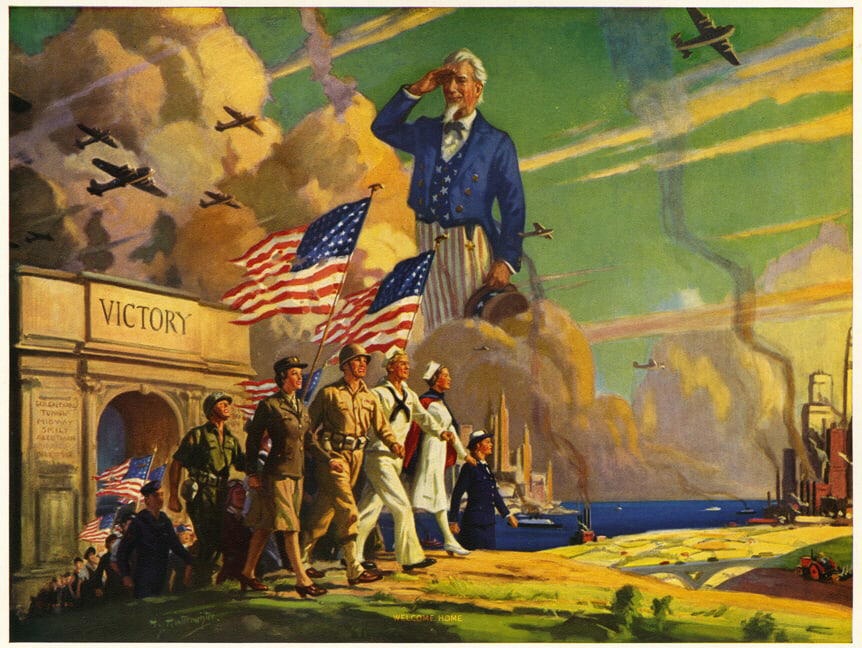
1943/1945, Our heroes return or Welcome home.
