= Huff =

Huff or huffing may refer to:

== People ==
- Huff (surname), a list of people with the surname

== Places in the United States ==
- Huff Township, Spencer County, Indiana
- Huff, Missouri, an unincorporated community
- Huff, Kentucky, an unincorporated community
- Huff, North Dakota, an unincorporated community
- Huff, Texas, a former town
- Huff Archeological Site, a Mandan village in North Dakota dated around 1450, on the National Register of Historic Places
- Huff Creek (disambiguation)
- Huff Run, a tributary of the Conotton Creek in eastern Ohio
- Huff's Fort, established around 1811 or 1812 in Jackson County, Indiana

== Buildings ==
- Huff Hall, a multi-purpose arena in Champaign, Illinois
- Huff House, the oldest house in Atlanta, Georgia; demolished in 1954
- Huff Memorial Library, Jackson, Wyoming, on the National Register of Historic Places
- Huff's Store, a general store in Burwood, Tennessee, on the National Register of Historic Places
- Huff House and Farmstead, in Somerset County, New Jersey, on the National Register of Historic Places

== Arts and entertainment ==
- Huff (TV series), a Showtime television program
- Hamilton Underground Film Festival, a yearly experimental film festival in Hamilton, New Zealand

== Other uses ==
- Huffing, a slang term for the use of inhalants
- Huffing or huff cough, a type of coughing used to clear airways of mucus
- Huffing, a forfeit in checkers

== See also ==
- HUF (disambiguation)
- Huff-Duff (HF/DF) High Frequency Direction Finder
- Huff-Daland Aero Corp
