= List of National Natural Landmarks in North Dakota =

There are 4 National Natural Landmarks in North Dakota.

North Dakota National Natural Landmarks (clickable map)

Name	Image	Date	Location	County	Ownership	Description
Fischer Lake		1960	47.083268°N 99.227339°W	Stutsman	mixed- state & private	Representative of the glacial moraine and pitted outwash plain surface of North Dakota.
Rush Lake		1965	48.904575°N 98.681398°W	Cavalier	private	A large shallow, essentially undisturbed prairie pothole lake.
Sibley Lake		1975	47.520278°N 98.345278°W	Kidder	mixed- state & private	A large, permanent alkaline lake.
Two Top and Big Top Mesa		1965	47.302222°N 103.487778°W	Billings	federal (Little Missouri National Grassland)	A badlands terrain of sandstones, siltstones and clay.

== See also ==
- List of National Historic Landmarks in North Dakota
