= List of National Historic Landmarks in North Dakota =

North Dakota National Historic Landmarks (clickable map)

The List of National Historic Landmarks in North Dakota contains the landmarks designated by the U.S. Federal Government for the U.S. state of North Dakota. There are 7 National Historic Landmarks (NHLs) in North Dakota.

== Key ==
	National Historic Landmark
^{†}	National Historic Landmark District
^{#}	National Historic Site, National Historical Park, National Memorial, or National Monument
^{*}	Delisted Landmark

== Current National Historic Landmarks ==
	Landmark name	Image	Date designated	Location	County	Description
1^{†}	Frederick A. and Sophia Bagg Bonanza Farm	Frederick A. and Sophia Bagg Bonanza Farm	April 5, 2005 (#85002832)	Mooreton; 46°15′11″N 96°51′57″W	Richland	Preserved bonanza farm.
2	Biesterfeldt Site		December 23, 2016 (#100000874)	Lisbon vicinity 46°23′46″N 97°29′11″W	Ransom	
3	Big Hidatsa Village Site	Big Hidatsa Village Site	July 19, 1964 (#66000600)	Stanton; 47°21′41″N 101°23′22″W	Mercer	Largest of three villages preserved in Knife River Indian Villages National Historic Site.
4^{#}	Fort Union Trading Post	Fort Union Trading Post	July 4, 1961 (#66000103)	Williston vicinity 47°59′58″N 104°02′26″W	McKenzie and Williams	Most important fur trading post on the upper Missouri until 1867. Visitors included John James Audubon, George Catlin, Father Pierre-Jean De Smet, Sitting Bull, Karl Bodmer, and Jim Bridger.
5	Huff Archeological Site	Huff Archeological Site	February 18, 1997 (#80002920)	Huff; 46°37′07″N 100°38′33″W	Morton	Former fortified village of the Mandan, on the bank of Lake Oahe. Archaeological site, now a state park open to the public.
6	Lynch Knife River Flint Quarry	Lynch Knife River Flint Quarry	July 13, 2011 (#11000629)	near Dunn Center; 47°21′12″N 102°37′22″W	Dunn	
7	Menoken Indian Village Site	Menoken Indian Village Site	July 19, 1964 (#66000599)	Bismarck; 46°50′29″N 100°31′06″W	Burleigh	Site of 13th-century village, now a state park.

== See also ==
- National Register of Historic Places listings in North Dakota
- List of National Historic Landmarks by state
- List of National Natural Landmarks in North Dakota
