= Van Vleck House and Barn =

Historic house in Wyoming, United States

- U.S. National Register of Historic Places
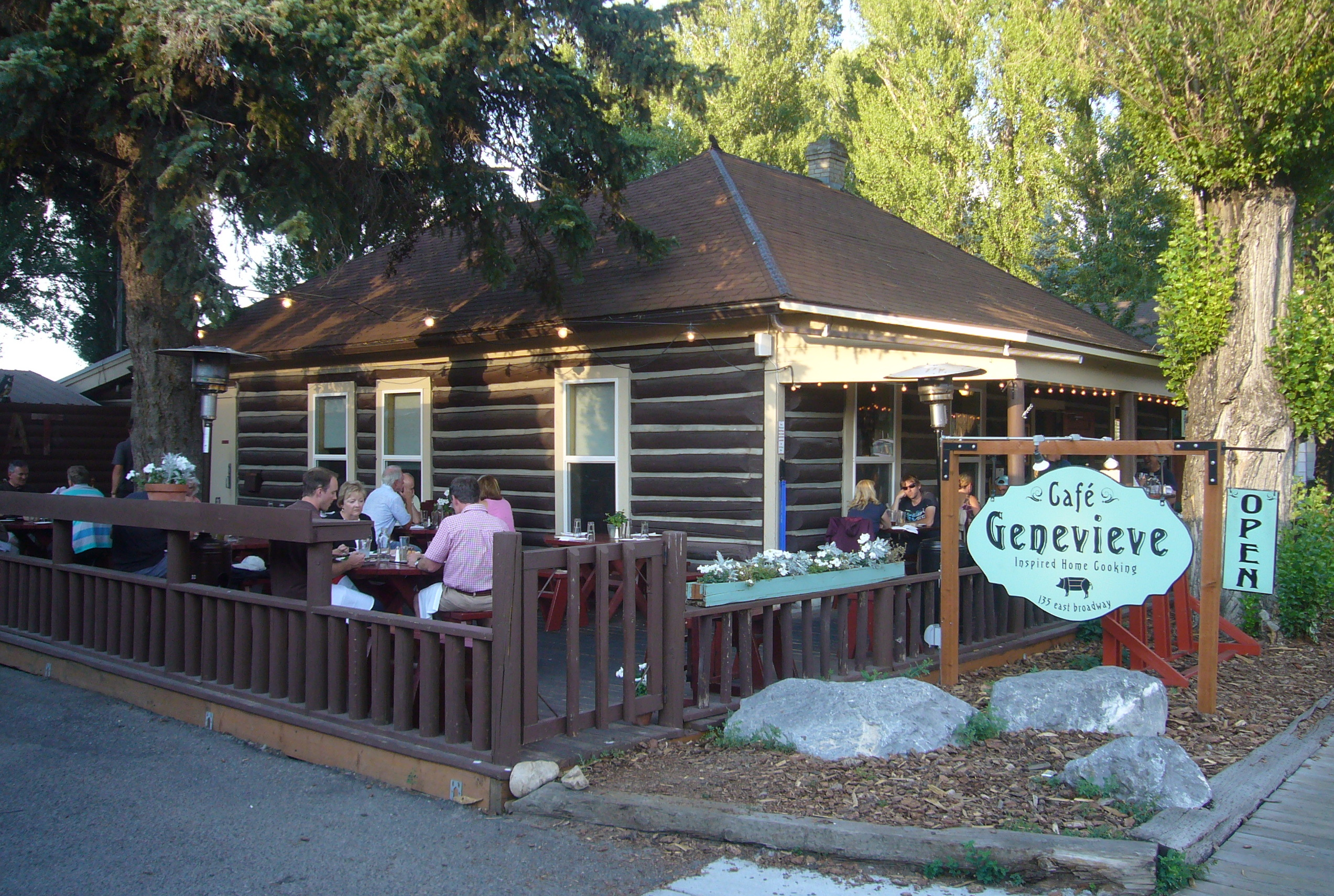
- Van Vleck House (2013)

- Location within Wyoming Location within the United States
- Location: Jackson, Wyoming
- Coordinates: 43°28′50″N 110°45′34″W
- Built: 1910
- Architect: Roy Van Vleck
- NRHP reference No.: 95001075
- Added to NRHP: September 7, 1995

The Van Vleck House was built in Jackson, Wyoming in 1910–1911. The log house and barn are the only remaining residential structures in the vicinity of the Town Square.

The Van Vleck House was built by Roy Van Vleck, operator of the first "mercantile", or general store, in Jackson. Roy and his new wife, Genevieve Lawton Van Vleck lived in the cabin from 1911 to 1960. The Van Vleck house was notable at the time for possessing its own well, which served much of the surrounding population. In 1920 Genevieve became one of the members of the first all-female town council in the United States, serving until 1923. Roy Van Vleck was the local land commissioner and served on the hospital and school boards. Van Vleck was also a leader of the opposition to the creation and expansion of Grand Teton National Park in the 1930s.

The house is a one-story log cabin. The approximately 36-foot (11 m) by 60-foot (18 m) L-shaped house was moved 30 feet (9.1 m) after a 1988 fire and set on a new foundation. It retains its orientation and context. The interior did not survive the fire and has been reconstructed. The barn, which is a few years newer than the house, stands nearby. The barn includes a central brick chimney and is used for storage. The barn was the location for the final fight scene featuring Clint Eastwood in the 1980 movie Every Which Way But Loose.

In 1980 the house became a restaurant. It was listed on the National Register of Historic Places in 1995, and is the only authentic historical structure in the central area of Jackson.

== Barn removal ==
In August 2009 work began to dismantle the barn for removal and reconstruction at a new site south of Jackson. The removal of the barn was approved by the town of Jackson, but the town requested that demolition be stopped to allow a review when it was revealed that the town's list of historic properties did not include the barn, despite its inclusion on the National Register. The owners of the site did not have immediate plans for the property and stated that they wished to "clean up the block."
