= George Washington Memorial Park =

George Washington Memorial Park may refer to:

- George Washington Memorial Park (Jackson, Wyoming), also known as "Town Square"
- George Washington Memorial Park (Paramus, New Jersey), a cemetery
