= HUF =

HUF may refer to:

== Places ==
- Terre Haute International Airport (IATA: HUF), in Indiana, United States

== People ==
- František Huf (born 1981), Czech bodybuilder
- Hans-Christian Huf (born 1956), German historian

== Brands and enterprises ==
- Huf Haus GmbH & Co. KG, a German company operating worldwide and based in Hartenfels, Westerwald region, that manufactures prefabricated homes
- HUF Worldwide, a skateboarding team and streetwear brand founded by Keith Hufnagel and Anne Freeman

== Other uses ==
- Hindu undivided family, a legal term related to the Hindu Marriage Act
- Humene language (ISO 639-3 language code), spoken in Papua New Guinea
- Hungarian forint by ISO 4217 currency code

== See also ==
- Huff (disambiguation)
- Huffington, a surname
- Huffy, an American supplier of bicycles
