= Jackson-Wilson High School =

Coordinates: 43°28′38″N 110°45′47″W

Jackson-Wilson High School (JWHS) is the former name of Jackson Hole High School. The school was located near 222 South Glenwood Street, in Jackson, Wyoming. The school was named for the two most populated towns in Teton County, Wyoming: Wilson and Jackson. JWHS was then as it is today, Teton County's only public high school. (Alternative high school is available for at risk students. Students in Alta, Wyoming go to the Driggs, Idaho schools due to logistics).

== History ==
Jackson-Wilson High School was the first and only high school serving Teton County, Wyoming. Its name was from the two most populated communities, Jackson and Wilson, Wyoming. In 1973, the name was changed to Jackson Hole High School to reflect the service to the entire Jackson Hole Valley. This article however deals with latter history of Jackson-Wilson High School until the old building's demise and the construction of the new high school in the South Park area of Jackson. This article deals with the old high school built in the mid-1930s, the main high school that was connected to it and the new two-story building built in 1966. All three buildings were torn down and razed between 1968 and the late 1980s.

Starting in 1964, JWHS was experiencing a rapid increase in the number of students. A "breezeway" was built to connect the present high school on Glenwood street to the old high school that sat directly behind the building. Although closed down, it was reopened to accommodate the 6th and 7th grades. This also allowed the use of the old gym for girls' physical education and of the theatre stage. Using this building did not last long as plans were underway to build a new junior high school and a modern two-story addition to the present high school.

In 1966, work began on a new two-story building that would connect to the high school. At the time, being two floors high was a bit of a novelty and an eye-opener in Jackson. The building opened to much fanfare in 1968. The old building behind the high school was then demolished. Work then began on a new junior high school, which was to be located by the then only grade school in Jackson. For the first year, junior high was again conducted on the top floor of the new high school addition. The new wing featured new desks, movable walls, an inner stairwell, and a weightlifting area in the basement portion for the sports teams.

By 1969 and 1970, JWHS had control of both floors of the new addition with completion of the junior high complex. Students were able to get their own student lounge with extra space now available but this was short-lived due to abuse of the privilege. High school students also did not have a hot meal cafeteria and had to bring their own lunches and eat in the gym; upper classmen could go out and grab a meal. JWHS students participated in football (the field was behind the grade school some 2 miles away), basketball, track, rodeo, and ski teams. Because of the harsh winter seasons, JWHS did not have a sanctioned baseball team nor did they have a swim team due to no indoor pool.

By 1973, the writing was on the wall for another new high school as Teton County began rapid growth and was outgrowing its infrastructure. In addition, the School Board saw fit to change the name of the school from Jackson-Wilson High School to Jackson Hole High School to reflect the school's entire area served in Teton County. While some felt this was not necessary, the board felt it was time for a change, and to show a progressive change to the future of Teton County.

=== New campus ===
When the new high school opened, many of the memorabilia of old senior class portraits that graced the walls of the old JWHS and trophies that were won were found in the trash behind the old high school. This outraged many former JWHS alumni and citizens. Many grabbed what they could to preserve some of the heritage of JWHS. The explanation given was there was no room for the items in the new high school and with the name change, the items had no place in the new building.

=== Transition of old campus to Central Wyoming College ===
The old JWHS campus became offices for Central Wyoming College outreach and the Arts and Humanities, among others. The area was finally remodeled, and re-landscaped. Traces of JWHS disappeared with the times. If one were to visit the Glenwood site today, unless you went to JWHS, you would never know the two-story high school was located there. The only landmark is the Western Motel, which was directly across the street and is still in business today.
