= Snow King Observatory and Planetarium =

Astronomy facility in Wyoming, United States

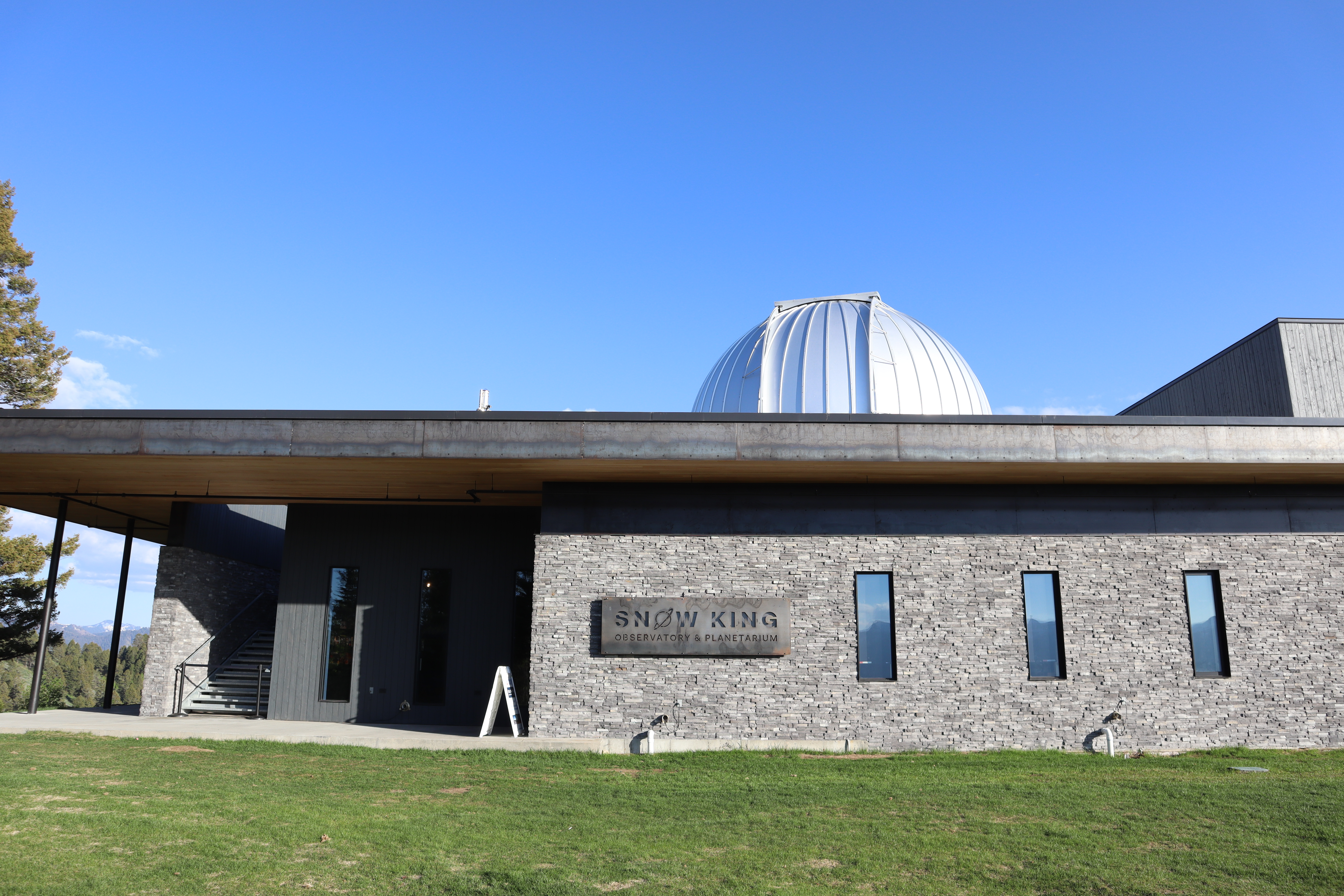
- The entrance to Snow King Observatory and Planetarium

General information
- Type: Planetarium
- Address: 100 East Snow King Avenue
- Town or city: Jackson, Wyoming
- Coordinates: 43.47047°N 110.78795°W
- Opened: June 1, 2024

Website
- Official website

Snow King Observatory and Planetarium is an astronomy facility on US Forest Service property at the 7,808-foot (2,380 m) summit of Snow King Mountain in Jackson, Wyoming.

== History ==
A Nevada–Wyoming amateur astronomer, Samuel Singer, created the nonprofit Wyoming Stargazing in 2014 to foster the project. Lead designer Jakub Galczynski joined Singer in 2015 to plan and design the Snow King Mountain Observatory. Max C. Chapman, President of Snow King Mountain, approached Samuel Singer at Wyoming Stargazing's farmers market booth to discuss prospects of the Snow King Observatory.

In January 2020, Bridger–Teton National Forest administrators released a draft environmental impact statement regarding the proposed facility.

The observatory officially opened with a speech by Bill Nye on June 1, 2024, becoming the first observatory served by a gondola lift in a ski resort in North America. Although this facility is on United States Forest Service land, it is not publicly offered for usage. Privately funded scientists and researchers can use the facilities for a fee.

In late 2024, Joe Zator, from University of Colorado at Boulder joined the observatory as the observatory director.

== Equipment and facilities ==
The Snow King Observatory and Planetarium offers a unique 150 mm solar telescope (hydrogen alpha), a Planewave CDK1000 1-meter corrected Dall-Kirkham Cassegrain telescope at 8,000 feet (2,400 m).

The planetarium features a 35-seat theater, and is capable of 180-degree projections on an 8-meter (26 ft) screen for films.

== See also ==
- List of astronomical observatories
- List of planetariums
