= Aaron Linsdau =

American adventurer (born 1973)

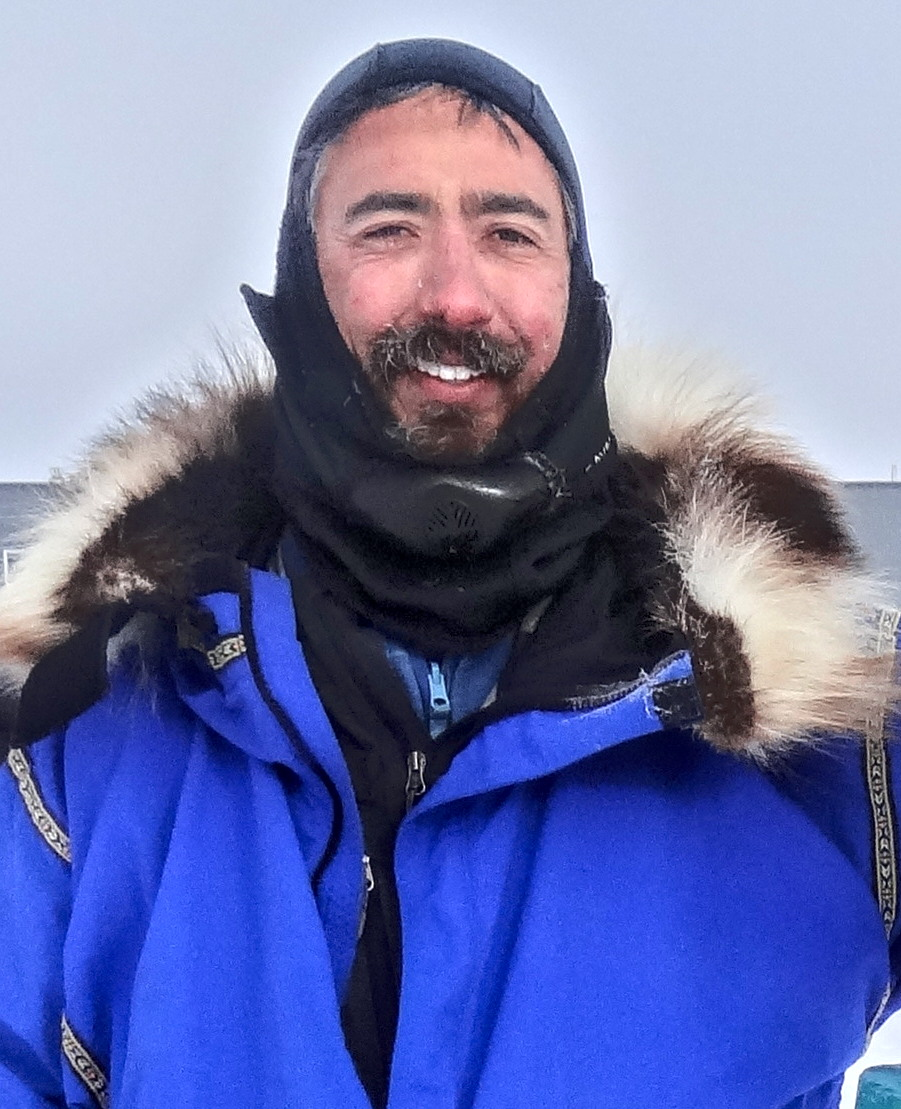
- Aaron Linsdau in Antarctica
- Born: 1973 (age 52–53); Jackson, Wyoming, U.S.
- Occupations: Polar explorer, speaker, author, photographer, educator
- Known for: Polar Exploration

Aaron Linsdau (born 1973) is an American adventurer living in Jackson, Wyoming. He is known for the longest solo expedition from Hercules Inlet to the South Pole, his book Antarctic Tears, his winter trek across the Greenland tundra, and his three ski expeditions across Yellowstone National Park in winter.

He led a two-person east–west ski crossing of the Greenland ice cap, a direction completed far less frequently than the standard west–east route, and handled all expedition logistics and planning.

Linsdau has undertaken more than thirty winter and cold-weather expeditions, including five solo attempts on Denali, a winter trek across the Greenland tundra from Kangerlussuaq to Sisimiut, and international climbs including Mt. Elbrus (Russia) and Mt. Kilimanjaro (Tanzania). His expeditions and work have been covered by the KUSI San Diego, KIFI/KIDK Idaho Falls, San Diego Union-Tribune, Jackson Hole News & Guide, San Diego Magazine, and ExplorersWeb.com. He is the author of several books on polar travel, cold-weather survival, and expedition preparation, including Antarctic Tears and Two Friends and a Polar Bear.

== Early life and education ==
Linsdau was born in 1973 in Jackson, Wyoming, and grew up in San Ysidro, San Diego, California.

He is an Eagle Scout. He earned a Bachelor of Science in electrical engineering from San Diego State University, where he specialized in embedded systems. While at SDSU, he was inducted into Tau Beta Pi, the national engineering honor society, and Eta Kappa Nu, the Institute of Electrical and Electronics Engineers (IEEE) honor society.

He later completed a Master of Science in Computational Science at San Diego State University, focusing on scientific data visualization.

Linsdau also completed the Feature Writing certificate program through the University of California, San Diego Extension, which included coursework in narrative nonfiction and magazine writing.

He completed coursework in video production at Southwestern College in Chula Vista, California.

== Career ==
Before embarking on his polar expeditions, Linsdau worked as a software engineer, a background noted in media coverage of his early expeditions.

In 2013, Linsdau traveled alone to the South Pole on skis. He took along 70 pounds of butter for energy, but it turned rancid from exposure to the sun during the final two weeks. Illness delayed him, and his trip to the pole took 80 days.

His expeditions have been covered by numerous media outlets, including Outside, the Jackson Hole News & Guide, the San Diego Union-Tribune, 7 Summit Club, and Inertia.

Linsdau speaks professionally about his experiences, teaching audiences how to build adversity resilience in organizations and prepare for extreme cold-weather conditions.

Linsdau has authored more than forty books on polar travel, outdoor skills, astronomy, and expedition preparation, published through Sastrugi Press. His authorship and eclipse work have been featured in coverage by the San Diego Union-Tribune, Jackson Hole News & Guide, and Local News 8.

Local media have also profiled Linsdau for his work as a Jackson-based outdoor photographer.

He is also listed as an inventor on a U.S. patent related to sports-equipment measurement systems, with corresponding filings in multiple countries.

=== Documentary work ===
Linsdau directed and appeared in the feature documentary Antarctic Tears - Determination, Adversity, and the Pursuit of a Dream at the Bottom of the World, distributed through Sastrugi Press.

== Books ==
Linsdau is the author of more than forty books on polar travel, winter camping, outdoor skills, astronomy, and expedition preparation, published through Sastrugi Press.

His early works include Adventure Expedition One, co-authored with Dr. Terry M. Williams, a how-to manual for first-time explorers focusing on expedition planning, risk management, and field preparation.

In Antarctic Tears, Linsdau recounts a solo unsupported journey to and back the South Pole. On November 1, 2012, Aaron Linsdau set out to ski unsupported to the South Pole and back from Hercules Inlet.

In Lost at Windy Corner, Aaron Linsdau attempted a solo climb of Denali in 2016 and 2017. He documented the experience of what climbing one of the seven summits alone was like.

Linsdau has also written a 13-volume set of regional guidebooks for the Solar eclipse of August 21, 2017, covering viewing logistics, travel advice, and photography recommendations for locations across the United States, including Wyoming, Idaho, Oregon, Nebraska, Illinois, Kentucky, North Carolina, and South Carolina.

He later authored a 15-volume series of state and regional guidebooks for the Solar eclipse of April 8, 2024, with titles covering the eclipse path from Texas to Maine, as well as Canada and Mexico.

His works additionally include cold-weather manuals such as How to Keep Your Feet Warm in the Cold, and The Motivated Amateur's Guide to Winter Camping, as well as the instructional Denali Mountaineering Expedition Bundle for aspiring climbers.

== Works ==
=== Fiction ===
==== The Grant Colson Thriller Series (2026-present) ====
An action-adventure thriller series following international field operative Grant Colson. The books focus on covert missions, hostile environments, and historical mysteries. The series is set in the same fictional universe as the SERA Archives and features the fictional agency known as the Strategic Exploration and Recovery Agency (SERA).

- The Magellan Deception: Book 1 of The Grant Colson Series. Sastrugi Press (Tundra Outpost Media). 2026. ISBN 978-1-64922-188-9.

==== The SERA Archives Thriller Series (2025-present) ====
A thriller series centered on the Strategic Exploration and Recovery Agency (SERA), a fictional organization that conducts high-risk missions involving history, science, and remote environments. The series shares its fictional universe with the Grant Colson novels and follows rotating SERA teams through stand-alone but connected operations.

- Black Ice: Book 0 Prequel of The SERA Archives Series. Sastrugi Press (Tundra Outpost Media). 2025. ISBN 978-1-64922-365-4.
- The Last Echo: Book 1 of The SERA Archives Series. Sastrugi Press (Tundra Outpost Media). 2025. ISBN 978-1-64922-364-7.
- The Shepherd's Code: Book 2 of The SERA Archives Series. Sastrugi Press (Tundra Outpost Media). 2025. ISBN 978-1-64922-358-6.
- The Bone Road: Book 3 of The SERA Archives Series. Sastrugi Press (Tundra Outpost Media). 2025. ISBN 978-1-64922-366-1.
- Iron Catacomb: Book 4 of The SERA Archives Series. Sastrugi Press (Tundra Outpost Media). 2026. ISBN 978-1-64922-367-8.
- Glacier Tomb: Book 5 of The SERA Archives Series. Sastrugi Press (Tundra Outpost Media). 2026. ISBN 978-1-64922-368-5.

=== Nonfiction ===
==== Expedition Narratives ====
A collection of nonfiction works documenting long-distance expeditions, high-risk travel, and survival experiences in extreme environments. These books recount real-world challenges faced during Antarctic travel, mountaineering risks, and unsupported Arctic crossings.

- Antarctic Tears: Determination, adversity, and the pursuit of a dream at the bottom of the world. Sastrugi Press. 2014. ISBN 978-0-9960206-0-2.
- Lost At Windy Corner: Lessons From Denali On Goals And Risks. Sastrugi Press. 2017. ISBN 978-1-944986-19-3.
- Two Friends And A Polar Bear: A Story of Friendship and Endurance Skiing Unsupported Across the Arctic Greenland Ice Cap. Sastrugi Press. 2023. ISBN 978-1-64922-289-3.

==== Outdoor Skills and How-To Guides ====
A collection of instructional guides covering wilderness skills, backcountry preparedness, and outdoor travel techniques. These works include resources on winter camping, cold-weather survival, knots and ropework, photography locations, and regional hiking routes.

- Adventure Expedition One: Plan and Execute Your First Expedition. Sastrugi Press. 2019. ISBN 978-1-944986-51-3.
- How to Keep Your Feet Warm in the Cold: Keep your feet warm in the toughest locations on Earth. Sastrugi Press. 2020. ISBN 978-1-64922-065-3.
- Jackson Hole Hiking Guide: A Hiking Guide to Grand Teton, Jackson, Teton Valley, Gros Ventre, Togwotee Pass, and more. Sastrugi Press. 2021. ISBN 978-1-64922-174-2.
- Explore Jackson Hole Guide: A Hiking Guide to Grand Teton, Jackson, Teton Valley, Gros Ventre, Togwotee Pass, and More. Sastrugi Press. 2021. ISBN 978-1-64922-024-0.
- The Most Crucial Knots to Know: Step-By-Step Guide How to Tie 40+ Knots for Camping, Survival, and Preppers. Sastrugi Press. 2021. ISBN 978-1-64922-226-8.
- 50 Jackson Hole Photography Hotspots (2nd ed.): A Guide for Photographers and Wildlife Enthusiasts. Sastrugi Press. 2022. ISBN 978-1-64922-250-3.
- The Motivated Amateur's Guide to Winter Camping: Essential Winter Camping Tips to Make Your Cold Outdoor Experience Safe and Enjoyable. Sastrugi Press. 2025. ISBN 978-1-64922-099-8.
- The Denali Mountaineering Expedition Bundle: Cold-Weather Mountaineering Skills, Survival, and Expedition Planning. Sastrugi Press. 2025. ISBN 978-1-64922-214-5.

==== 2017 Total Eclipse Guides ====
A series of state-specific guidebooks published for the August 21, 2017, total solar eclipse. Each volume provides regional viewing information, safety guidance, travel logistics, and local resources for eclipse observers across the path of totality.

- Jackson Hole Total Eclipse Guide, Commemorative Official Guidebook. Sastrugi Press. 2016. ISBN 978-1-944986-04-9.
- Oregon Total Eclipse Guide, Commemorative Official Keepsake Guidebook. Sastrugi Press. 2017. ISBN 978-1-944986-07-0.
- Idaho Total Eclipse Guide, Commemorative Official Keepsake Guidebook. Sastrugi Press. 2017. ISBN 978-1-944986-06-3.
- Wyoming Total Eclipse Guide, Commemorative Official Keepsake Guidebook. Sastrugi Press. 2017. ISBN 978-1-944986-05-6.
- Nebraska Total Eclipse Guide, Commemorative Official Keepsake Guidebook. Sastrugi Press. 2017. ISBN 978-1-944986-08-7.
- Illinois Total Eclipse Guide, Commemorative Official Keepsake Guidebook. Sastrugi Press. 2017. ISBN 978-1-944986-11-7.
- Missouri Total Eclipse Guide, Commemorative Official Keepsake Guidebook. Sastrugi Press. 2017. ISBN 978-1-944986-10-0.
- Kentucky Total Eclipse Guide, Commemorative Official Keepsake Guidebook. Sastrugi Press. 2017. ISBN 978-1-944986-12-4.
- Tennessee Total Eclipse Guide, Commemorative Official Keepsake Guidebook. Sastrugi Press. 2017. ISBN 978-1-944986-13-1.
- Kansas Total Eclipse Guide, Commemorative Official Keepsake Guidebook. Sastrugi Press. 2017. ISBN 978-1-944986-13-1.
- North Carolina Total Eclipse Guide, Commemorative Official Keepsake Guidebook. Sastrugi Press. 2017. ISBN 978-1-944986-14-8.
- Georgia Total Eclipse Guide, Commemorative Official Keepsake Guidebook. Sastrugi Press. 2017. ISBN 978-1-944986-14-8.
- South Carolina Total Eclipse Guide, Commemorative Official Keepsake Guidebook. Sastrugi Press. 2017. ISBN 978-1-944986-16-2.

==== 2024 Total Eclipse Guides ====
A collection of state- and region-specific guidebooks produced for the April 8, 2024, total solar eclipse. These volumes provide viewing information, mapped path-of-totality coverage, photography considerations, and regional travel notes for locations across Mexico, the United States, and Canada.

- Texas Total Eclipse Guide, Official Commemorative 2024 Keepsake Guidebook. Sastrugi Press. 2023. ISBN 978-1-944986-23-0.
- Oklahoma Total Eclipse Guide, Official Commemorative 2024 Keepsake Guidebook. Sastrugi Press. 2023. ISBN 978-1-944986-24-7.
- Arkansas Total Eclipse Guide, Official Commemorative 2024 Keepsake Guidebook. Sastrugi Press. 2023. ISBN 978-1-944986-25-4.
- Missouri Total Eclipse Guide, Official Commemorative 2024 Keepsake Guidebook. Sastrugi Press. 2023. ISBN 978-1-944986-26-1.
- Kentucky Total Eclipse Guide, Official Commemorative 2024 Keepsake Guidebook. Sastrugi Press. 2023. ISBN 978-1-944986-27-8.
- Illinois Total Eclipse Guide, Official Commemorative 2024 Keepsake Guidebook. Sastrugi Press. 2023. ISBN 978-1-944986-28-5.
- Indiana Total Eclipse Guide, Official Commemorative 2024 Keepsake Guidebook. Sastrugi Press. 2023. ISBN 978-1-944986-29-2.
- Ohio Total Eclipse Guide, Official Commemorative 2024 Keepsake Guidebook. Sastrugi Press. 2023. ISBN 978-1-944986-30-8.
- Pennsylvania Total Eclipse Guide, Official Commemorative 2024 Keepsake Guidebook. Sastrugi Press. 2023. ISBN 978-1-944986-31-5.
- New York Total Eclipse Guide, Official Commemorative 2024 Keepsake Guidebook. Sastrugi Press. 2023. ISBN 978-1-944986-32-2.
- Vermont Total Eclipse Guide, Official Commemorative 2024 Keepsake Guidebook. Sastrugi Press. 2023. ISBN 978-1-944986-33-9.
- New Hampshire Total Eclipse Guide, Official Commemorative 2024 Keepsake Guidebook. Sastrugi Press. 2023. ISBN 978-1-944986-34-6.
- Maine Total Eclipse Guide, Official Commemorative 2024 Keepsake Guidebook. Sastrugi Press. 2023. ISBN 978-1-944986-35-3.
- Mexico Total Eclipse Guide, Official Commemorative 2024 Keepsake Guidebook. Sastrugi Press. 2023. ISBN 978-1-944986-60-5.
- Canada Total Eclipse Guide, Official Commemorative 2024 Keepsake Guidebook. Sastrugi Press. 2023. ISBN 978-1-944986-57-5.

== Awards ==
- National Eagle Scout Association Outstanding Eagle Scout Award
- Elevated to Senior Member of the Institute of Electrical and Electronics Engineers (IEEE)
