= Max C. Chapman =

American businessman

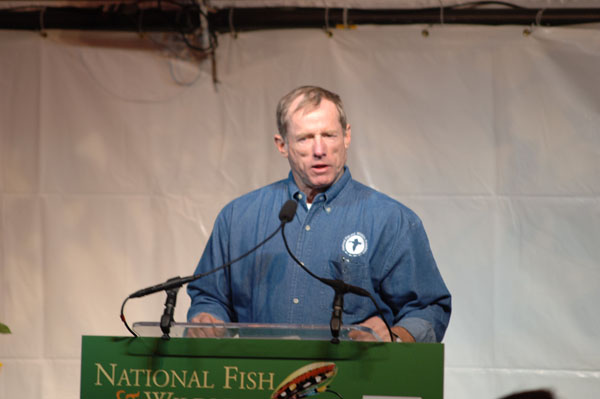
Chapman in 2005

Max Carrol Chapman Jr. (born 1935 in Portsmouth, Virginia) is a billionaire American businessman and philanthropist. He was the former president and CEO of Kidder, Peabody & Co., the investment banking and broker-dealer subsidiary of the parent, Kidder, Peabody Group, Inc. He also served as president and chief operating officer of the parent company. From 1987 to 1997, he held a number of positions with Nomura Securities, as part of their U.S. division.

== Education ==
Chapman obtained a Bachelor of Arts in Economics from the University of North Carolina at Chapel Hill in 1966 and a Master of Business Administration from Columbia Business School in 1969. He was also a placekicker for the North Carolina Tar Heels football team, and is best remembered for kicking a 42-yard field goal against the Duke Blue Devils in a 16–14 win. This earned them a trip to Florida to play in the 1963 Gator Bowl, which saw the Tar Heels blow out the Air Force Falcons 35–0.

== Career ==
Following graduation from business school, he joined Kidder, Peabody & Co. There, he founded the Financial Futures Department and co-founded the High-Yield Bond and Merchant Banking Group.

In 1987, he was elected as the president and CEO of Kidder, Peabody & Co., the investment banking and broker-dealer subsidiary of the parent, Kidder, Peabody Group, Inc. At the same time, he was also elected as president and chief operating officer of the parent company. In 1989, he joined Nomura Securities, where he served as the chairman of Nomura Holding America Inc., managing director of the Nomura Securities Co., Ltd., and chairman of Nomura Europe Holding plc. In 1996, Chapman stepped down from his position as co-chief executive and became managing director of the parent company, while also retaining the ceremonial role of chairman of Nomura's U.S. division. Chapman left the company in 1999.

He currently owns many properties and companies throughout the United States, including the Brooks Lake Lodge, a private 800-acre ranch in Dubois, WY and the Snow King Mountain Resort which has the one-of-a-kind Snow King Observatory and Planetarium in Jackson Hole, Wyoming.

== Philanthropy ==
Chapman donated $5 million to the University of North Carolina at Chapel Hill to build a new building, which was named Chapman Hall in his honor.
