= Huff Creek =

Huff Creek may refer to:

- Huff Creek (Nodaway River tributary), a stream in Missouri
- Huff Creek (West Virginia), a tributary of the Guyandotte River

== See also ==
- Huff (disambiguation)
