= Snow King Mountain =

Resort in Wyoming

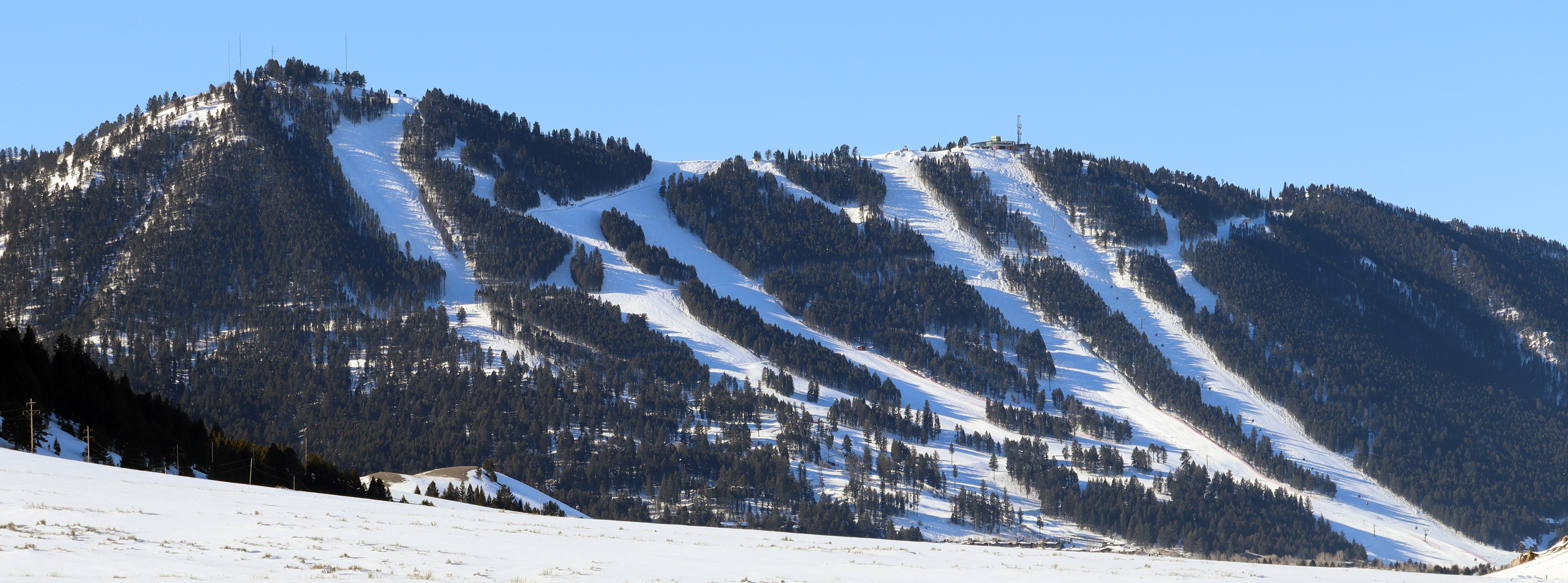
- Snow King Mountain in March 2024

- Location in the United States Location in Wyoming
- Location: Jackson, Wyoming, U.S.
- Coordinates: 43.472°N 110.761°W
- Status: Active
- Vertical: 1,571 ft (479 m)
- Top elevation: 7,808 ft (2,380 m)
- Base elevation: 6,237 ft (1,901 m)
- Skiable area: 400 acres (1.6 km^{2})
- Trails: 35
- Longest run: 0.9 miles (1.4 km)
- Lift system: 3 chairlifts 1 rope tow 1 gondola 3 Magic carpet lifts
- Terrain parks: 3
- Snowfall: 500 in (1,270 cm)
- Snowmaking: 150 acres (0.6 km^{2})
- Website: www.snowkingmountain.com

Snow King Mountain is a summer and winter resort in the western United States, in Jackson, Wyoming. The mountain is Jackson's original 1936 ski hill, located on the southeast edge of the city, and was the first ski area in Wyoming. Locals sometimes refer to Snow King as "The Town Hill," and it offers skiing, hiking, an alpine slide, and a planetarium.

== History ==
In 1936, the Civilian Conservation Corps created a switch-back horse and hiking trail to the top of the mountain and the trail became one of Snow King's first skiing racecourses. The Jackson Hole Ski Club was established in 1937, and two years later lift-served skiing began on Wyoming's first ski area with the addition of a 4,000-foot (1,220 m) rope tow. While previously named Kelly's Hill or the town hill, it was officially named Snow King in 1938. The first chairlift was installed in 1946, a converted ore tram from Salida, Colorado that utilized single-chairs instead of ore cars. In the 1950s, the single-chairs were replaced with double chairs.

In 1978, The Rafferty double was constructed on the east slopes of the resort near the Snow King Hotel. A double chairlift was installed in 1981 and known as the Summit lift.

In the summer of 2014, after almost 35 years of service, the Rafferty Double chair was removed and replaced by a Doppelmayr quad chairlift going four hundred feet higher than the prior lift. The Summit lift was uninstalled in 2021 and replaced by a gondola lift. Manufactured by Leitner-Poma, each gondola car can ferry eight passengers from the base of the mountain to the summit.

In 2025, the hotel at the base of the mountain, Snow King Resort, was sold to Castle Peak Holdings for an undisclosed amount, purportedly around $84 million USD. Rebranded as Trailborn Jackson Hole in 2026, the footprint of the resort did not change but many areas were repurposed. The Trailborn brand entered a long-term partnership agreement with Marriott in 2024.

== Attractions ==
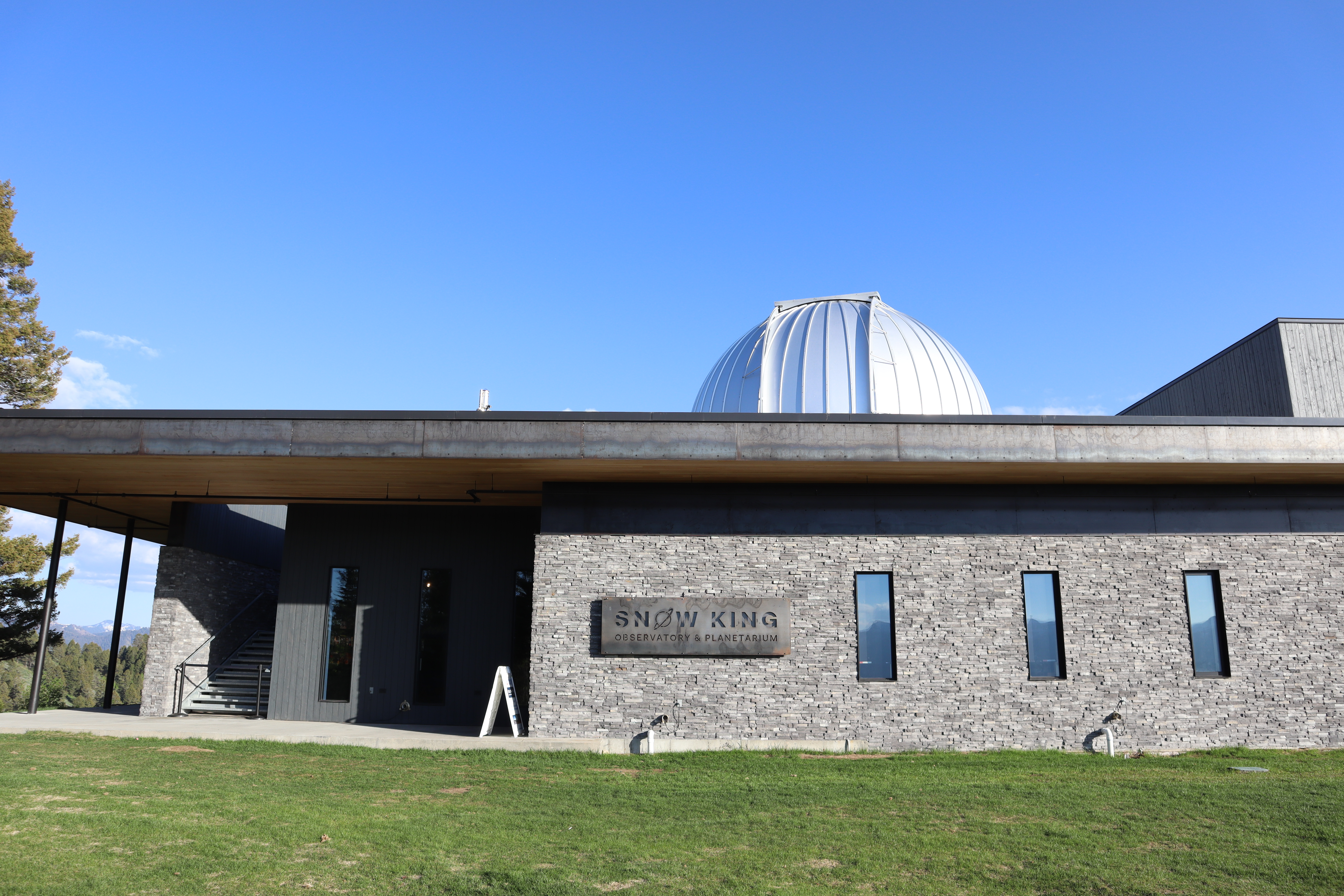
The Snow King Observatory and Planetarium in 2025

Outside of the skiing, Snow King features several other attractions. The gondola is open year round, operating as a ski lift in the winter and a scenic transport in the summer months. In 2015, the Cowboy Coaster, a 1,660 feet (510 m) alpine coaster opened. The coaster is open year round, and can reach speeds of up to 25 miles per hour (40 km/h) In 2022, a 2,820 feet (860 m) long zipline opened that can reach speeds of up to 60 miles per hour (97 km/h). The resort also features a miniature golf course, an alpine slide, and a maze. Snow King Observatory and Planetarium opened at the summit in 2024.

== Lifts ==
The resort features three chairlifts, one rope tow, three magic carpet lifts, and a gondola lift.
