= Lynch Quarry site =

Coordinates: 47°21′12″N 102°37′22″W

- Lynch Quarry Site
- U.S. National Register of Historic Places
- U.S. National Historic Landmark
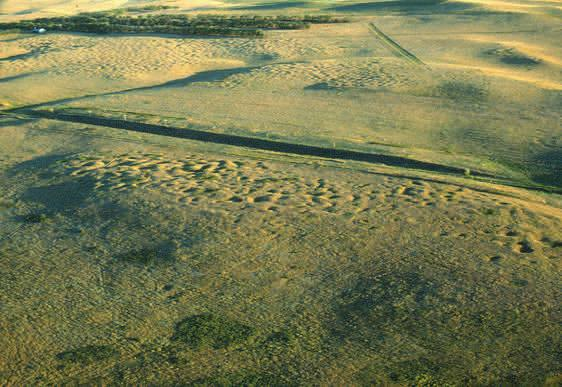
- Aerial view of the site (National Park Service photo)

- Location within North Dakota Location within the United States
- Nearest city: Dunn Center
- Area: 690 acres (280 ha)
- NRHP reference No.: 11000629

Significant dates
- Added to NRHP: July 13, 2011
- Designated NHL: July 13, 2011

The Lynch Quarry Site, also known as the Lynch Knife River Flint Quarry, and designated by the Smithsonian trinomial 32DU526, is a historic pre-Columbian flint quarry located near Dunn Center, North Dakota, United States. The site was a major source of flint found at archaeological sites across North America, and it has been estimated that the material was mined there from 11,000 B.C. to A.D. 1600. The site was designated a National Historic Landmark in 2011.

Knife River flint was a prized toolmaking material among North America's prehistoric population, as it is particularly easy to work into projectile points, knives, and scraping tools. Materials from Knife River quarries have been found at prehistoric archaeological sites in Northern Canada, New York, and New Mexico, and would have been traded by area tribes for other materials such as shell, obsidian, cloth, and (in the early European contact period) metal weapons. The Lynch site, whose known extent is at least 690 acres (280 ha) has an estimated 20,000 pits from which flint was quarried. The pits range in depth from 3 to 10 feet (0.91 to 3.05 m), and are accompanied by spoil piles. It is located on the banks of Spring Creek, a tributary of the Knife River. The site is remarkably well preserved, despite agricultural activity over parts of it, and the digging of shafts for coal mining in some areas. At the time of the site's nomination as a National Historic Landmark, detailed examination of the site for specific work areas had not taken place; the entire site is covered with chipped and flaked stone.

== See also ==
- List of National Historic Landmarks in North Dakota
- National Register of Historic Places listings in Dunn County, North Dakota
