= Jackson, Wyoming =

- Town
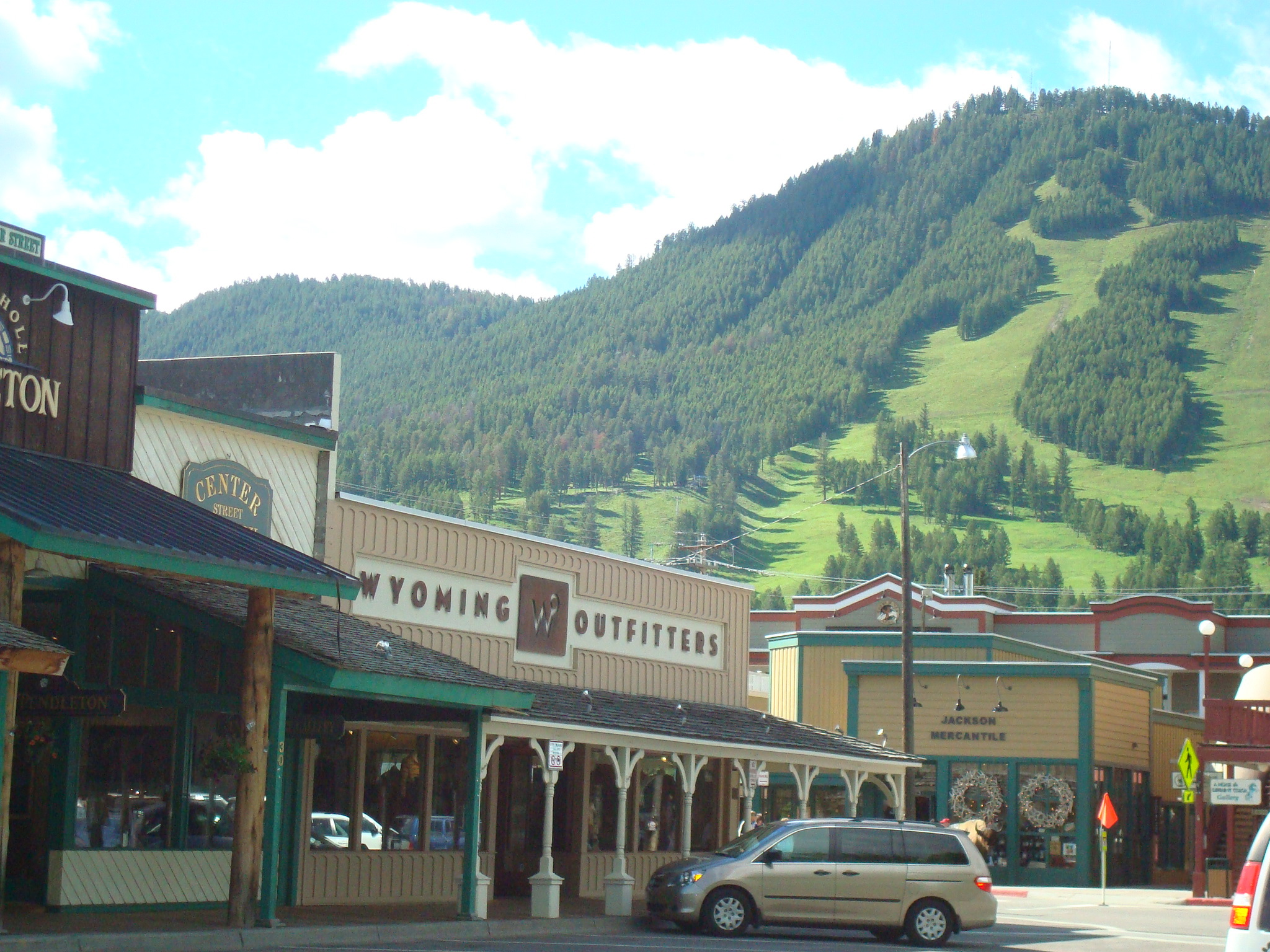
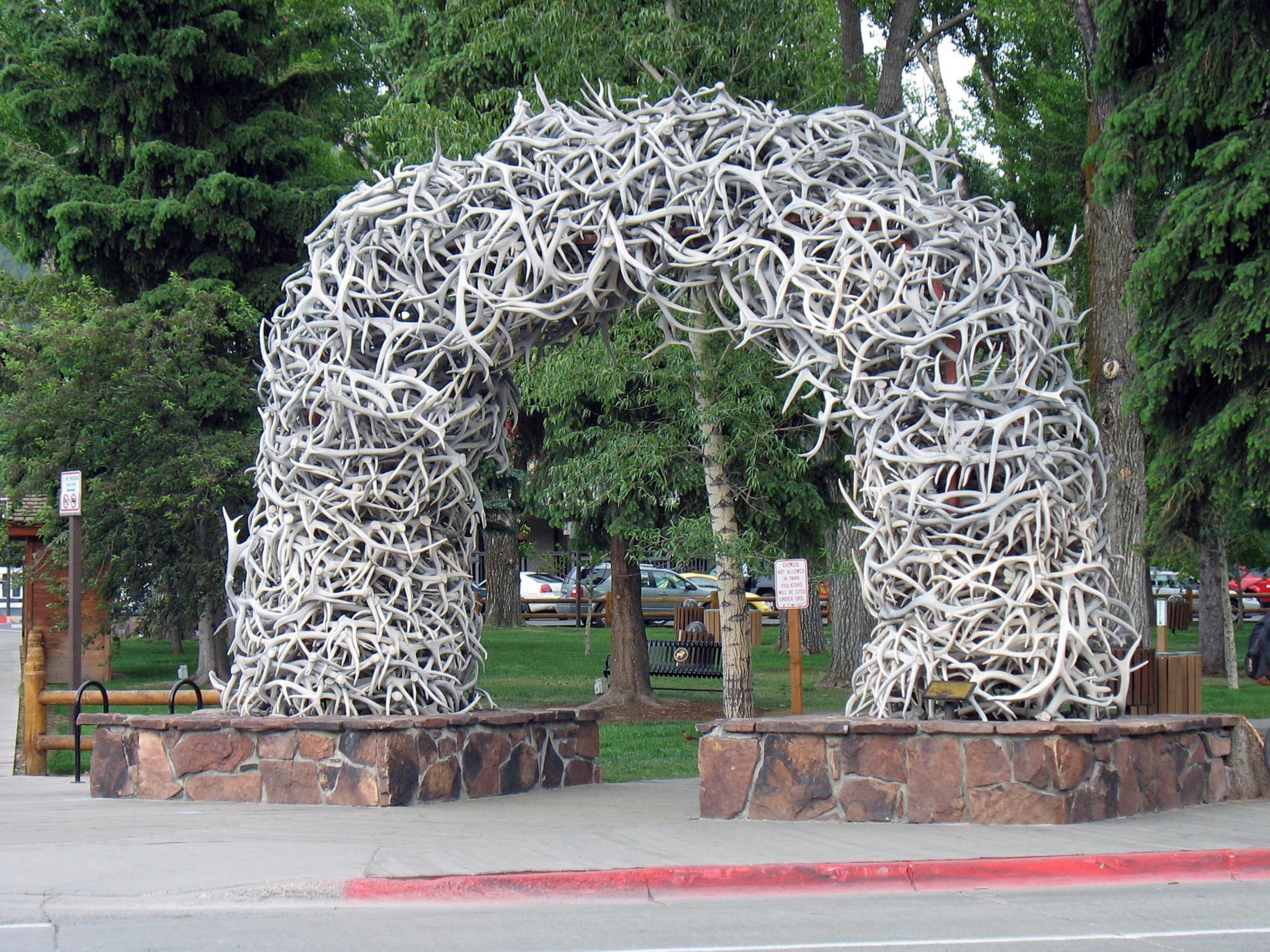
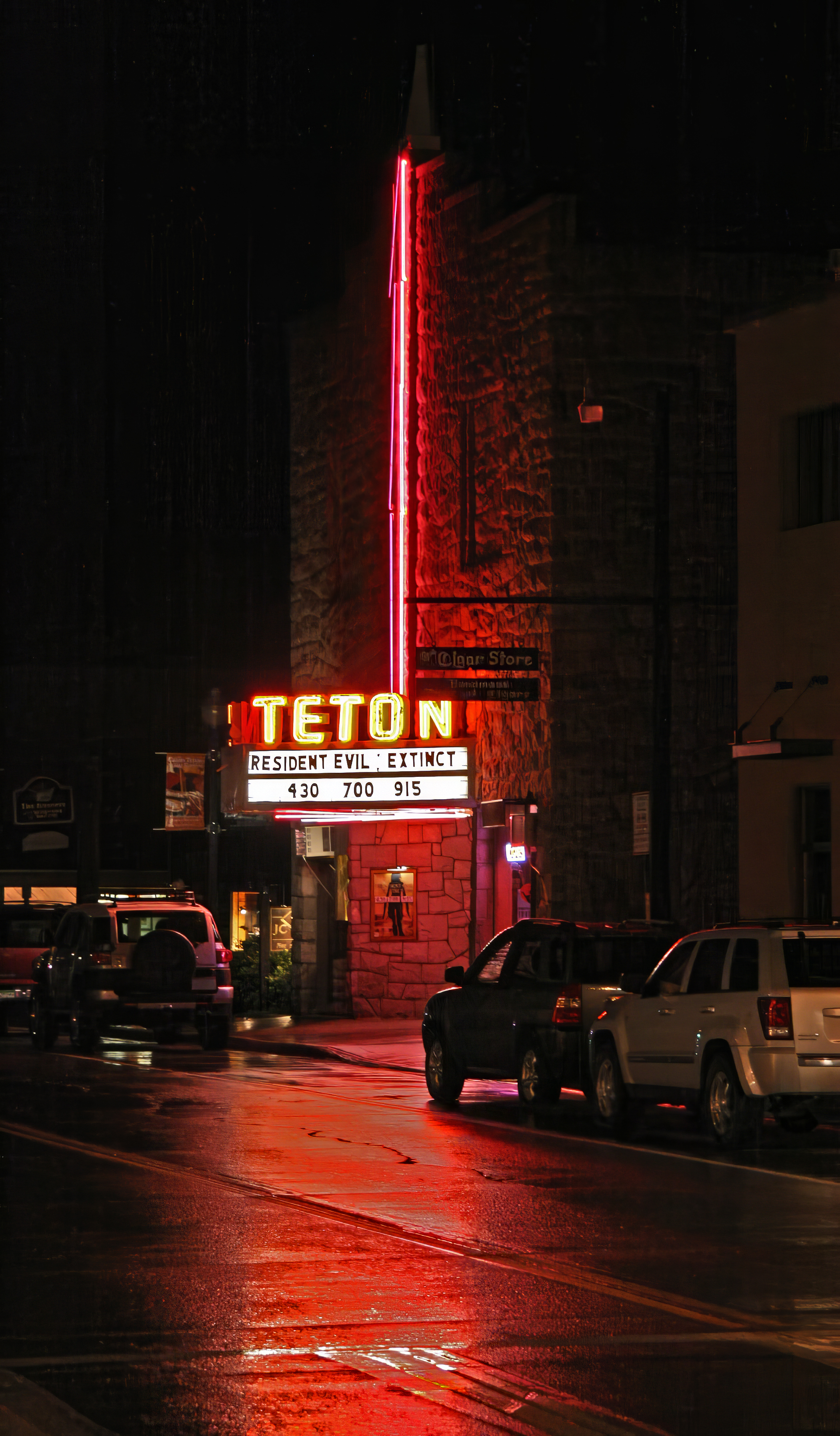
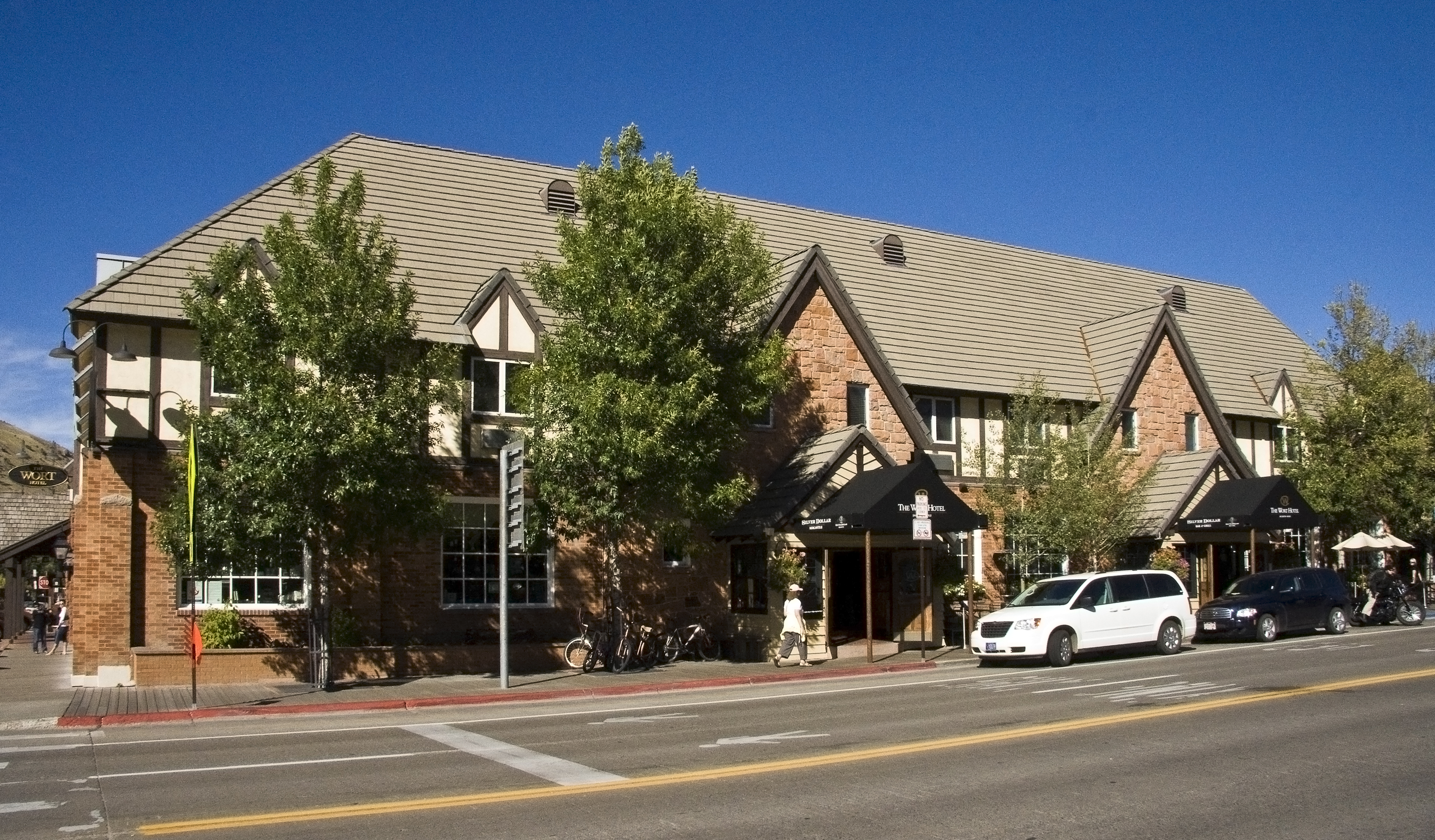
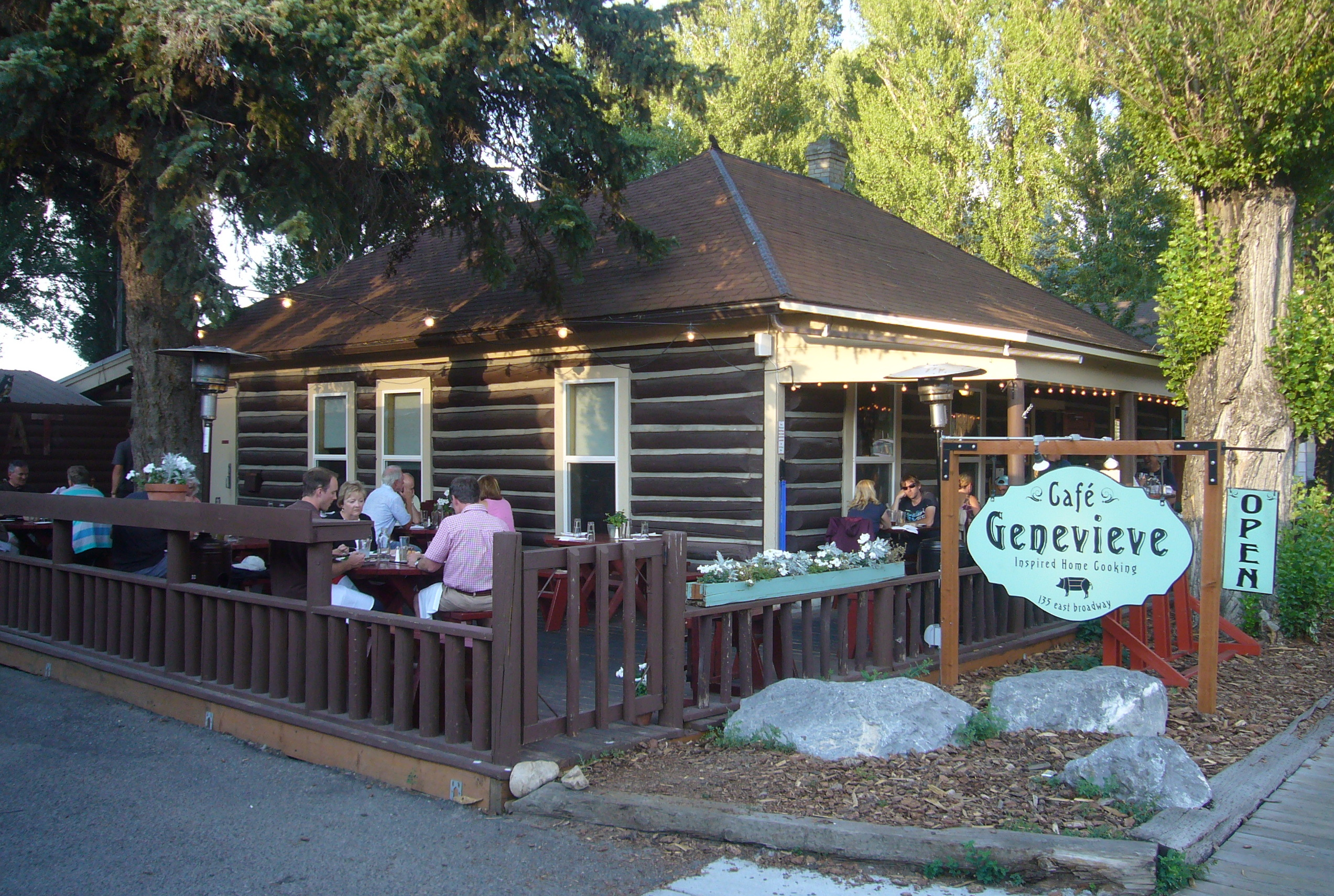
- Downtown Jackson George Washington Memorial Park Teton Theater Wort Hotel Van Vleck House

- Seal
- Nickname(s): Jackson Hole, The Hole, JH
- Interactive map of Jackson, Wyoming
- Coordinates: 43°28′24″N 110°35′45″W
- Country: United States
- State: Wyoming
- County: Teton
- Founded: 1894
- Incorporated: 1914
- Named for: David Edward Jackson

Government
  - Type: Mayor–council
  - Mayor: Arne Jorgensen
  - Town Council: Jonathan Schechter; Devon Viehman; Kevin Regan; Alyson Spery

Area
  - Total: 3.009 sq mi (7.793 km^{2})
  - Land: 2.978 sq mi (7.713 km^{2})
  - Water: 0.031 sq mi (0.080 km^{2}) 1.03%
- Elevation: 6,237 ft (1,901 m)

Population (2020)
  - Total: 10,760
  - Density: 3,613/sq mi (1,395/km^{2})
- Time zone: UTC−7 (Mountain (MST))
  - Summer (DST): UTC−6 (MDT)
- ZIP Codes: 83001, 83002
- Area code: 307
- FIPS code: 56-40120
- GNIS feature ID: 2412799
- Website: jacksonwy.gov

Jackson is a resort town in Teton County, Wyoming, United States. The population was 10,760 at the 2020 census, and was estimated at 10,680 in 2024. It is Teton County's only incorporated municipality and its county seat, and it is the largest incorporated town in Wyoming. Jackson is the principal town of the Jackson, WY-ID Micropolitan Statistical Area, which includes Teton County in Wyoming and Teton County in Idaho. The town is often called Jackson Hole, which is the name of the valley in which it is located. Jackson is a popular tourist destination due to its proximity to the ski resorts Jackson Hole Mountain, Snow King Mountain, and Grand Targhee. Jackson also acts as a gateway community for Grand Teton National Park and Yellowstone National Park.

== History ==
Jackson was originally populated by Native American tribes including the Shoshoni, Crow, Blackfeet, Bannock, and Gros Ventre. In the early 1800s, the locality became a prime area for trappers and mountain men to travel through, one example being John Colter. After being discharged from the Corps of Discovery of the Lewis and Clark Expedition in 1806 at Fort Mandan, in present-day North Dakota, Colter visited Jackson Hole during the winter of 1807/1808. Other mountain men who visited the valley include Jim Bridger, Jedediah Smith, and William Sublette, who are responsible for many of the names in the area. David Edward Jackson gave his name to the valley after a winter spent on the shores of Jackson Lake.

As part of the Hayden Expedition of 1871 and 1872, William Henry Jackson took the first photographs of the Teton Range and Yellowstone. His photographs along with the sketches by Tom Moran, were important evidence to convince Congress to protect Yellowstone National Park. Yellowstone National Park became the first National Park in 1872. Grand Teton National Park was created in 1929 and greatly expanded in 1950 after John D. Rockefeller Jr. purchased and then donated over 30,000 acres (12,000 ha).

The town of Jackson was named in 1894 and incorporated in 1914. Some of the early buildings remain and can be found throughout the area of the Town Square.

The town of Jackson elected an all-woman city government (including town council and mayor, who in turn appointed women to town marshal, town clerk and treasurer) in 1920.

The first ski rope tow was built at Teton Pass in 1937 and Snow King Resort was established in 1930. Teton County has three excellent ski areas including Jackson Hole Mountain Resort in Teton Village, Grand Targhee Ski, and Summer Resort located on the western slope of the Tetons as well as Snow King Resort.

The town of Jackson is the county seat of Teton County and the only incorporated municipality in the region. Less than 3% of land in Teton County is privately owned. Of the 2,697,000 acres (1,091,000 ha) in Teton County, 97% are federally or state owned/managed.

In 2009, the town of Jackson was designated as a Preserve America Community. This designation recognizes that, as a community, the town protects and celebrates its heritage, uses historic assets for economic development, and encourages people to experience and appreciate local historic resources.

== Geography ==
Jackson is located at an elevation of 6,237 feet (1,901 m) above sea level. According to the United States Census Bureau, the town has a total area of 3.009 square miles (7.79 km^{2}), of which 2.978 square miles (7.71 km^{2}) is land and 0.031 square miles (0.08 km^{2}) (1.03%) is water.

Jackson is surrounded by the Teton and Gros Ventre mountain ranges. The Teton Range is commonly associated with Jackson Hole and is a popular sightseeing attraction for many visitors. The Gros Ventre Range, by contrast, is geologically older than the Tetons and has a much broader width which encompasses huge expanses of wilderness; it is not as easily accessible.

Soils at Jackson Hole are mostly dark, excessively drained, moderately alkaline gravelly loam of the Greyback series.

Flat Creek, a tributary of the Snake River, runs through the town.

=== Climate ===
Jackson experiences a humid continental climate (Köppen Dfb), with warm summers and very cold winters. Due to its location in a very narrow river valley, Jackson and the rest of the Snake headwaters experience a unique microclimate that gets considerably more precipitation–much of it snow–than the majority of Wyoming and has higher humidity during much of the year. Its elevation is also responsible for extreme differences between day and night temperatures, which makes the climate very close to being classified as subarctic (Köppen Dfc). Extreme temperatures range from −52 °F (−47 °C) on December 20, 1924, to 101 °F (38 °C) on July 17, 1934, and July 20, 1934, and on average 236.0 mornings fall below freezing and 34.7 of these below 0 °F (−18 °C); the 1991 to 2020 average window for subzero Fahrenheit temperatures is from November 22 to March 3, while the window for freezing temperature is from August 22 to July 5, but freezing temperature have been recorded on every single day of the year except for July 25.

Snowfall averages 78.2 inches or 1.99 meters. The highest monthly total has been 56.0 inches (1.42 m) in January 1969, and the most in one season being 153.3 inches (3.89 m) between July 1966 and June 1967.

Climate data for Jackson, Wyoming, 1991–2020 normals, extremes 1905–present
Month	Jan	Feb	Mar	Apr	May	Jun	Jul	Aug	Sep	Oct	Nov	Dec	Year
Record high °F (°C)	55 (13)	58 (14)	71 (22)	79 (26)	90 (32)	95 (35)	101 (38)	98 (37)	93 (34)	87 (31)	67 (19)	66 (19)	101 (38)
Mean maximum °F (°C)	43.6 (6.4)	46.5 (8.1)	56.3 (13.5)	67.9 (19.9)	76.8 (24.9)	83.7 (28.7)	89.9 (32.2)	88.2 (31.2)	83.3 (28.5)	74.0 (23.3)	55.7 (13.2)	44.7 (7.1)	90.0 (32.2)
Mean daily maximum °F (°C)	26.1 (−3.3)	30.4 (−0.9)	40.2 (4.6)	50.2 (10.1)	60.3 (15.7)	69.8 (21.0)	79.1 (26.2)	78.0 (25.6)	68.1 (20.1)	54.5 (12.5)	37.6 (3.1)	26.2 (−3.2)	51.7 (11.0)
Daily mean °F (°C)	16.2 (−8.8)	19.9 (−6.7)	29.2 (−1.6)	38.0 (3.3)	45.9 (7.7)	53.8 (12.1)	60.2 (15.7)	58.9 (14.9)	50.5 (10.3)	39.7 (4.3)	26.7 (−2.9)	16.5 (−8.6)	38.0 (3.3)
Mean daily minimum °F (°C)	6.3 (−14.3)	9.3 (−12.6)	18.2 (−7.7)	25.8 (−3.4)	31.5 (−0.3)	37.8 (3.2)	41.4 (5.2)	39.8 (4.3)	32.8 (0.4)	24.9 (−3.9)	15.8 (−9.0)	6.8 (−14.0)	24.2 (−4.3)
Mean minimum °F (°C)	−19.3 (−28.5)	−15.6 (−26.4)	−2.0 (−18.9)	12.8 (−10.7)	18.4 (−7.6)	27.6 (−2.4)	32.5 (0.3)	29.8 (−1.2)	20.7 (−6.3)	10.2 (−12.1)	−2.6 (−19.2)	−17.3 (−27.4)	−24.5 (−31.4)
Record low °F (°C)	−50 (−46)	−48 (−44)	−49 (−45)	−5 (−21)	5 (−15)	12 (−11)	24 (−4)	18 (−8)	5 (−15)	−9 (−23)	−27 (−33)	−52 (−47)	−52 (−47)
Average precipitation inches (mm)	1.45 (37)	1.43 (36)	1.33 (34)	1.46 (37)	1.83 (46)	1.61 (41)	1.10 (28)	1.14 (29)	1.59 (40)	1.57 (40)	1.37 (35)	1.76 (45)	17.64 (448)
Average snowfall inches (cm)	19.1 (49)	15.6 (40)	9.2 (23)	4.2 (11)	0.6 (1.5)	0.0 (0.0)	0.0 (0.0)	0.0 (0.0)	0.1 (0.25)	2.0 (5.1)	11.0 (28)	16.4 (42)	78.2 (199.85)
Average extreme snow depth inches (cm)	17.1 (43)	18.8 (48)	16.1 (41)	3.7 (9.4)	0.5 (1.3)	0.0 (0.0)	0.0 (0.0)	0.0 (0.0)	0.0 (0.0)	1.6 (4.1)	5.8 (15)	10.9 (28)	20.5 (52)
Average precipitation days (≥ 0.01 in)	12.3	10.1	8.8	9.3	11.0	9.7	7.3	7.6	8.0	8.7	9.5	13.6	115.9
Average snowy days (≥ 0.1 in)	10.8	9.1	5.5	2.4	0.4	0.0	0.0	0.0	0.1	1.7	5.4	11.4	46.8
Source 1: NOAA
Source 2: National Weather Service

== Demographics ==
Historical population
Census	Pop.	Note	%±
1900	59		—
1910	264		347.5%
1920	307		16.3%
1930	533		73.6%
1940	1,046		96.2%
1950	1,244		18.9%
1960	1,437		15.5%
1970	2,688		87.1%
1980	4,511		67.8%
1990	4,472		−0.9%
2000	8,647		93.4%
2010	9,577		10.8%
2020	10,760		12.4%
2024 (est.)	10,680	▼	−0.7%
source: U.S. Decennial Census; 2020 Census

=== Racial and ethnic composition ===
Jackson, Wyoming – racial and ethnic composition Note: the US Census treats Hispanic/Latino as an ethnic category. This table excludes Latinos from the racial categories and assigns them to a separate category. Hispanics/Latinos may be of any race.
Race / ethnicity (NH = non-Hispanic)	Pop. 1990	Pop. 2000	Pop. 2010	Pop. 2020
White alone (NH)	4,295 (96.04%)			7,573 (70.38%)
Black or African American alone (NH)	15 (0.34%)			29 (0.27%)
Native American or Alaska Native alone (NH)	53 (1.19%)			52 (0.48%)
Asian alone (NH)	28 (0.63%)			168 (1.56%)
Pacific Islander alone (NH)	—			2 (0.02%)
Other race alone (NH)	0 (0.00%)			38 (0.35%)
Mixed race or multiracial (NH)	—			325 (3.02%)
Hispanic or Latino (any race)	81 (1.81%)	1,024 (11.84%)	2,607 (27.22%)	2,573 (23.91%)
Total	4,472 (100.00%)	8,647 (100.00%)	9,577 (100.00%)	10,760 (100.00%)

=== 2020 census ===
As of the 2020 census, Jackson had a population of 10,760. The median age was 34.8 years. 20.5% of residents were under the age of 18 and 9.4% of residents were 65 years of age or older. For every 100 females there were 106.4 males, and for every 100 females age 18 and over there were 106.2 males age 18 and over.

100.0% of residents lived in urban areas, while 0.0% lived in rural areas.

There were 4,373 households in Jackson, of which 29.5% had children under the age of 18 living in them. Of all households, 38.8% were married-couple households, 26.2% were households with a male householder and no spouse or partner present, and 25.2% were households with a female householder and no spouse or partner present. About 28.9% of all households were made up of individuals and 7.5% had someone living alone who was 65 years of age or older.

The population density was 3,633.91 inhabitants per square mile (1,403.1/km^{2}). There were 4,930 housing units at an average density of 1,664.98 per square mile (642.9/km^{2}). Of all housing units, 11.3% were vacant. The homeowner vacancy rate was 2.0% and the rental vacancy rate was 4.4%.

=== Demographic estimates ===
According to realtor website Zillow, the average price of a home as of September 30, 2025, in Jackson is $1,914,123.

As of the 2023 American Community Survey, there are 4,239 estimated households in Jackson with an average of 2.5 persons per household. The town has a median household income of $112,609. Approximately 5.6% of the town's population lives at or below the poverty line. Jackson has an estimated 86.6% employment rate, with 55.0% of the population holding a bachelor's degree or higher and 95.6% holding a high school diploma. There were 5,146 housing units at an average density of 1,728.01 per square mile (667.2/km^{2}).

=== 2010 census ===
As of the 2010 census, there were 9,577 people, 3,964 households, 1,858 families residing in the town. The population density was 3,291.1 inhabitants per square mile (1,270.7/km^{2}). There were 4,736 housing units at an average density of 1,627.5 per square mile (628.4/km^{2}). The racial makeup of the town was 79.83% White, 0.37% African American, 0.81% Native American, 1.44% Asian, 0.13% Pacific Islander, 15.15% from some other races and 2.28% from two or more races. Hispanic or Latino people of any race were 27.22% of the population.

There were 3,964 households, of which 24.7% had children under the age of 18 living with them, 35.2% were married couples living together, 6.6% had a female householder with no husband present, 5.0% had a male householder with no wife present, and 53.1% were non-families. 31.9% of all households were made up of individuals, and 5.3% had someone living alone who was 65 years of age or older. The average household size was 2.39 and the average family size was 3.04.

The median age in the town was 31.9 years. 18% of residents were under the age of 18; 11.6% were between the ages of 18 and 24; 43.8% were from 25 to 44; 20.5% were from 45 to 64; and 6.2% were 65 years of age or older. The gender makeup of the town was 54.1% male and 45.9% female.

=== 2000 census ===
As of the 2000 census, there were 8,647 people, 3,631 households, 1,670 families residing in the town. The population density was 3,037.2 inhabitants per square mile (1,172.7/km^{2}). There were 3,861 housing units at an average density of 1,356.2 per square mile (523.6/km^{2}). The racial makeup of the town was 89.37% White, 0.21% African American, 0.77% Native American, 0.62% Asian, 0.03% Pacific Islander, 7.62% from some other races and 1.36% from two or more races. Hispanic or Latino people of any race were 11.84% of the population.

There were 3,631 households out of which 23.5% had children under the age of 18 living with them, 34.4% were married couples living together, 7.1% had a female householder with no husband present, and 54.0% were non-families. 29.9% of all households were made up of individuals, and 4.4% had someone living alone who was 65 years of age or older. The average household size was 2.35, and the average family size was 2.97.

In the town the population was spread out with 18.4% under the age of 18, 13.9% from 18 to 24, 43.7% from 25 to 44, 18.2% from 45 to 64, and 5.8% who were 65 years of age or older. The median age was 31 years. For every 100 females there were 117.5 males. For every 100 females age 18 and over, there were 118.4 males.

The median income for a household in the town was $47,757, and the median income for a family was $53,915. Males had a median income of $31,152 versus $24,307 for females. The per capita income for the town was $25,004. About 2.6% of families and 6.8% of the population were below the poverty line, including 7.3% of those under age 18 and 8.8% of those age 65 or over.

== Economy ==
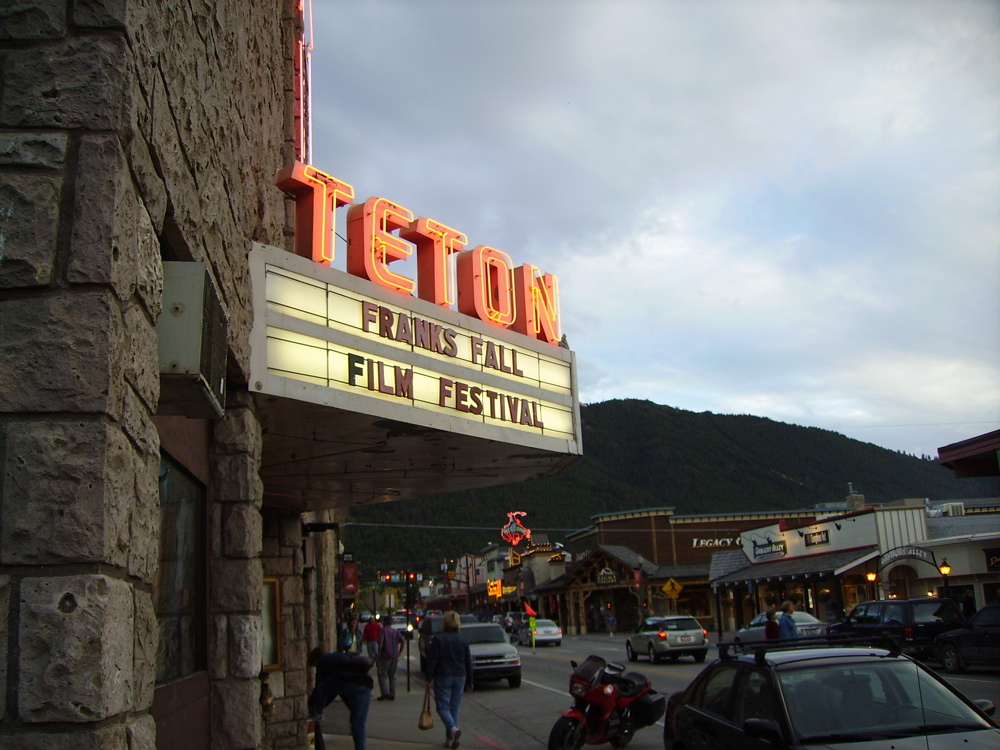
Teton Theater

As of the 2010 Census, the main industries which provide employment are: arts, entertainment, recreation, accommodation and food services (32.2%), construction (8.7%), retail trade (12.4%), educational services, health care and social assistance (11.9%), and professional, scientific, and management, and administrative and waste management services (11.8%).

A strong local economy, primarily due to tourism, has allowed Jackson to develop a large shopping and eating district characterized by a large number of art galleries, custom jewelers, and designer clothing retailers centered on the town square.

== Arts and culture ==
- Center for the Arts: The center was founded in 1991 to help support an artist culture within the town. Construction of the facility was completed in 2007.
- Elkfest: The annual Jackson Hole Elk Antler Auction occurs each spring. At this event, members of the Boy Scouts of America help sell all the antlers collected on the nearby National Elk Refuge. Profits go to help the local Boy Scouts and the refuge.
- Grand Targhee Resort: About an hour away, 42 miles (68 km), on the west side of the Teton Range in Alta, opened in 1969, it is accessed through Idaho over Teton Pass.
- Grand Teton Music Festival: This is a seven-week classical music festival held every summer in the town of Jackson.
- Grand Teton National Park: A national park that includes the Teton Mountain Range, roughly 310,000 acres (130,000 ha). The park brings in more than two million recreational tourists each year. The Grand Teton National Park is roughly 5 miles (8 km) away from Jackson.
- Jackson Hole Mountain Resort: The resort opened in 1966, 12 miles (19 km) north of Jackson. It has abundant steep terrain and has one of the highest vertical drops in North America, at 4,139 feet (1,262 m).
- National Elk Refuge: The refuge was created to shelter one of the largest elk herds in the country and borders the town of Jackson. Throughout the winter visitors can go on horse-drawn sleigh rides to view the herd.
- National Museum of Wildlife Art: Overlooking the National Elk Refuge is the National Museum of Wildlife Art which shows and preserves many wildlife artworks. Along with pieces inside of the museum, there is a 3/4-mile (1.2 km) trail with many sculptures along it.
- Snow King Mountain Resort: The first ski resort in Jackson and is significantly cheaper than Jackson Hole Mountain Resort. Even though Snow King is cheaper it is still quite a challenging hill. This resort is located on the Southeast edge of town. 400+ acres of skiable terrain with 3 chairlifts and a high speed summit gondola
- Snow King Observatory and Planetarium: An educational program located at the Snow King Mountain summit
- Yellowstone National Park: Mostly in Wyoming, Yellowstone also extends into Idaho and Montana. This park was the first national park in the country, and brings in roughly four million visitors each year. This park is less than 60 miles away from Jackson.

== Government ==
Jackson is administered by a mayor and town council. The current mayor is Arne Jorgensen.

As of November 2024, the following are members of the Town Council: Jonathan Schechter, Devon Viehman, Kevin Regan, and Alyson Spery.

== Education ==
Public education in the town of Jackson is provided by Teton County School District #1, which covers all of Teton County.

Schools serving the town include Jackson Elementary School (grades K–5), Colter Elementary School (grades K–5), Munger Mountain Elementary (grades K–5), Jackson Hole Middle School (grades 6–8), Jackson Hole High School (formerly Jackson-Wilson High School), Teton Science Schools (grades pre K-12), Summit Innovations High School (grades 9–12), the Jackson Hole Classical Academy (grades K–12), and the Jackson Hole Community School.

Jackson has a public library, a branch of the Teton County Library. The 1938 Teton County Library, which is a rustic log cabin, is on the National Register of Historic Places. That building became the Huff Memorial Library.

== Transportation ==
Jackson lies at the junction of US 26/US 89/US 189/US 191 and Wyoming Highway 22 (the Teton Pass Highway).

The town is served by Jackson Hole Airport, the busiest airport in the state of Wyoming. Public transportation is provided by START (Southern Teton Area Rapid Transit), which connects Jackson to Teton Village and adjacent communities in Star Valley, Wyoming and Teton Valley, Idaho. There are also airport buses to Salt Lake City, and places in between.

== Jackson Hole Economic Policy Symposium ==
Since 1978, the Kansas City Federal Reserve Bank has held an annual economic summit at Jackson (Hole) that is globally known as the Jackson Hole Economic Summit or officially as the "Jackson Hole Economic Symposium". Attendees include prominent central bankers, finance ministers, and academics from around the world.

== In popular culture ==
- Movies shot in Jackson include The Big Trail (1930), The Big Sky (1952), Shane (1953), Any Which Way You Can (1980), Rocky IV (1985), Ghosts Can't Do It (1990), and Django Unchained (2012).
- It is also a major location in the action-adventure video game The Last of Us (2013) and its sequel (2020), in which it is home to a large community of survivors in a post-apocalyptic world; however, scenes set in Jackson in the game's television adaptation (2023) were instead shot in the Canadian town of Canmore, Alberta, which doubled for Jackson.

Jackson has gained notability since a livestream of its town square went viral on YouTube in 2016, leading to much fascination with the town's elk antler arches and unusually high prevalence of red pickup trucks. It first went viral when a sheriff stopped at a red light in the early hours of the morning, got out of his patrol car, and dabbed towards the camera before leaving.

== Notable people ==
- Sandra Bullock (born 1964), actress
- Jimmy Chin (born 1973), professional climber, photographer, and Academy Award-winning film director; directed, alongside his wife, E. Chai Vasarhelyi, Free Solo
- Tom Chrystie (1933–2013), banker who served as the first Chief Financial Officer of Merrill Lynch & Company and industry pioneer who created the Cash Management Account
- Affie Ellis (born c. 1980), politician who served in the Wyoming Senate from the 8th district as a member of the Republican Party
- Harrison Ford (born 1942), actor
- Clifford Hansen (1912–2009), 26th Governor of Wyoming
- Aaron Linsdau (born 1973), adventurer living in Jackson, Wyoming; known for the longest solo expedition from Hercules Inlet to the South Pole
- John Franklyn Mars (born 1935), businessman and heir to the Mars candy company fortune
- Mary Mead (1935–1996), rancher, businesswoman, politician
- Matt Mead (born 1962), attorney, businessman, politician
- Travis Rice (born 1982), professional snowboarder
- Milward Simpson (1897–1993), 23rd Governor of Wyoming
- Carol Tomé (born 1957), businesswoman
- Lyle Waggoner (1935–2020), actor, sculptor, presenter, travel trailer salesman, model; known for his work on The Carol Burnett Show
- Christy Walton (born 1949), widow of John T. Walton who was one of the sons of Sam Walton, the founder of Walmart'

== See also ==
- Angling in Yellowstone National Park
- Blacktail Butte
- Flat Creek Ranch
- Jackson-Wilson High School
- Jackson Hole, China, a planned community modeled after Jackson
- Jackson Hole News&Guide
- Wyoming Outdoor Council
