= Huff Archeological Site =

Coordinates: 46°37′07″N 100°38′33″W

- U.S. National Register of Historic Places
- U.S. National Historic Landmark
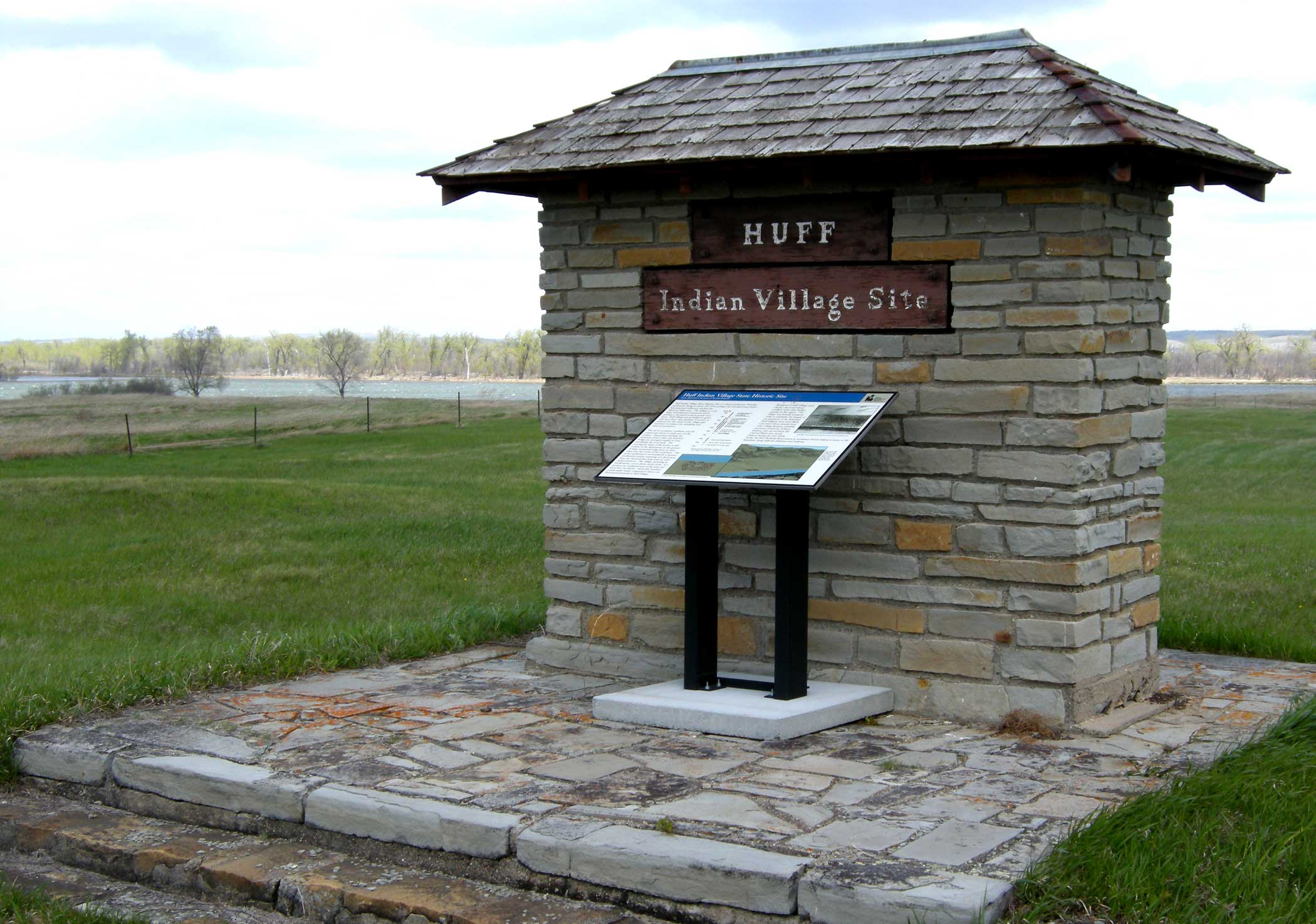

- Location within North Dakota Location within the United States
- Nearest city: Huff, North Dakota
- NRHP reference No.: 80002920

Significant dates
- Added to NRHP: July 23, 1980
- Designated NHL: February 18, 1997

The Huff Archeological Site is a prehistoric Mandan village in North Dakota dated around 1450 AD. It was discovered in the early 1900s. The site has been designated a National Historic Landmark, and is one of the best preserved sites of the period.

== Location ==
The site is located near the town of Huff in Morton County, North Dakota on the bank of the Missouri River. In the 1960s, excavators enlisted the assistance of the US Army Corps of Engineers to stabilize the river bank and protect the site. Because of this, most of the site is undisturbed.

The rectangular layout of the village, which once included hundreds of lodges and outer fortifications, is easily seen on the surface at the site. The 2,000-foot-long (610 m) ditch still surround the village on three sides. The village spans 12 acres of land next to the river bank.

== History ==
The village was occupied about 200 years before European influence. The people who lived here were agriculturalists and hunted bison. Conflict seemed to be an issue to these people, since the settlement was heavily fortified with ditches and bastions. The buildings inside the fortifications were all rectangular, except one, and dug into pits one or two feet deep. Their support posts were made of trees from the surrounding area. Entryways of all the buildings face southwest, away from the river. The one house that is different from the others is more square in shape with rounded corners. The village layout is similar to other Mandan villages in that it has a central plaza and a ceremonial structure that opens into the plaza.

== Today ==
Today, the site has a walking tour that includes informative signs and is protected by the State Historical Society of North Dakota as Huff Indian Village State Historic Site. The Mandan people now reside on the Fort Berthold Reservation, North Dakota. This site is considered an important piece of North Dakota archaeology, and of Native American heritage.

== See also ==
- List of National Historic Landmarks in North Dakota
- National Register of Historic Places listings in Morton County, North Dakota
