= Hans-Christian Huf =

German author, historian and television journalist

Hans-Christian Huf (born 1956 in Starnberg) is a German author, historian and television journalist.

Huf studied German studies, history and politics in Munich, Germany and Bordeaux in France. Since 1984 he has been an employee of the public-service German television channel ZDF. Since 1987 he has been part of the editorial staff of the ZDF-editorial Geschichte und Gesellschaft (history and society) and Kultur und Gesellschaft (culture and society).
