= Two Top and Big Top Mesa =

- Location within North Dakota
- Location: Billings County, North Dakota
- Coordinates: 47°18′08″N 103°29′16″W
- Area: 14 acres (5.7 ha)
- Designated: 1965

Two Top and Big Top Mesa are two adjacent mesas that are approximately one mile (1.6 km) apart in western North Dakota. They were declared National Natural Landmarks in 1965. The tops of the mesas are rare examples of undisturbed grassland which have never been grazed or cultivated. They are located in or around the Little Missouri National Grasslands.

== Geology ==
Big Top mesa is approximately 12 acres (4.9 ha), while Two Top is around 2 acres (0.81 ha). They rise about 400 feet (120 m) above the badlands. They are made of sandstone, Morton silt loam and clay.
