= Rush Lake (North Dakota) =

Wetland in the state of North Dakota, United States

- Location within North Dakota Location within the United States
- Location: Cavalier County, North Dakota
- Coordinates: 48.9046°N 98.6814°W
- Basin countries: United States
- Surface area: 1,593 acres (6.45 km^{2})

U.S. National Natural Landmark
- Designated: 1975

Rush Lake is a body of water in Cavalier County, North Dakota, United States. It is defined as a prairie pothole. The pothole is located south of the Canada–United States border, near the town of Langdon. In private ownership as of 2025, the body of water was listed as a National Natural Landmark in 1975.

== Description ==
The National Park Service describes Rush Lake as follows:

A large shallow, essentially undisturbed prairie pothole lake, Rush Lake is an important staging area for waterfowl.
