= Huff Memorial Library =

- U.S. National Register of Historic Places
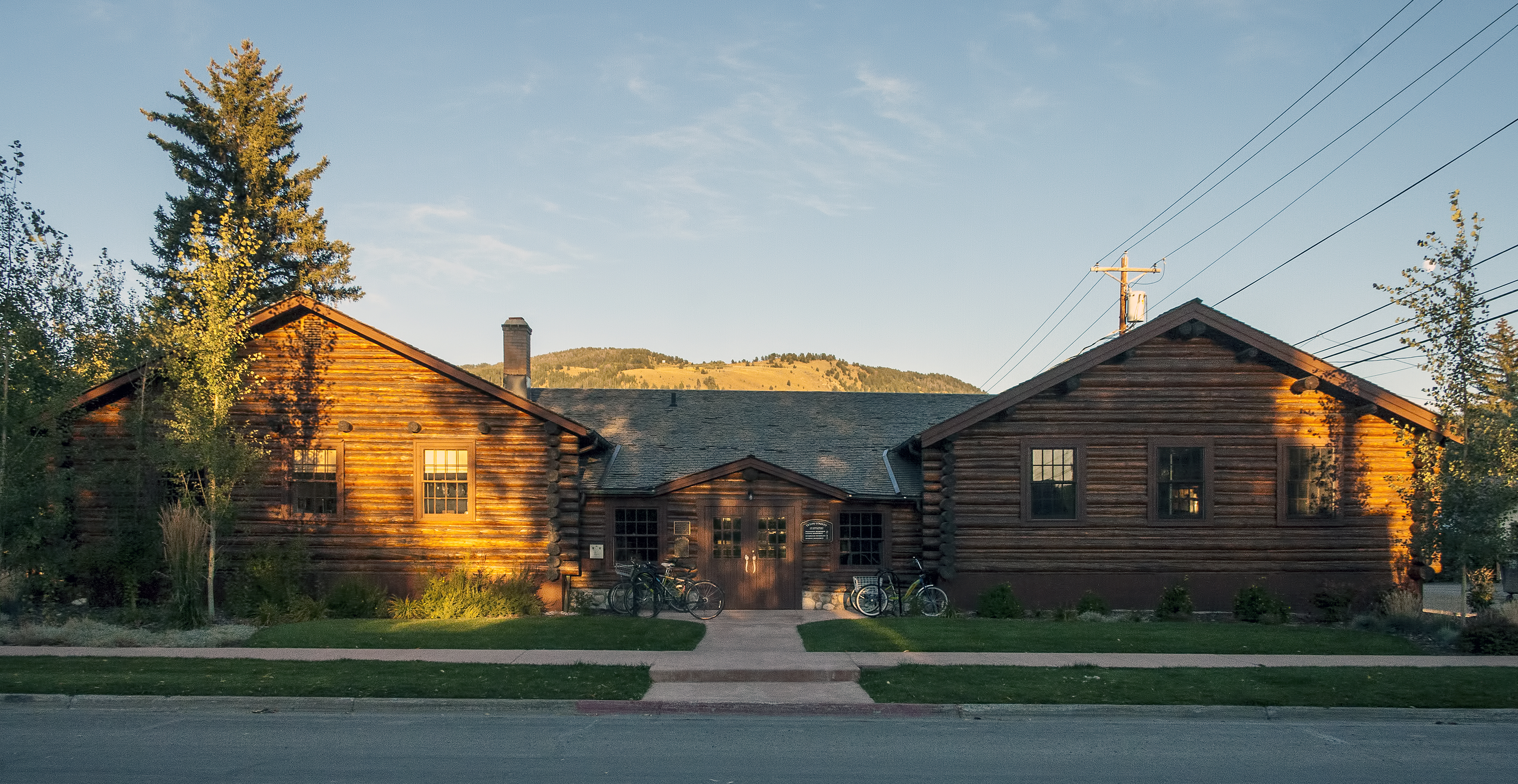

- Location within Wyoming Location within the United States
- Location: Jackson, Wyoming
- Coordinates: 43°28′33.94″N 110°45′37.26″W
- Built: 1938
- Architect: Paul Colbron
- NRHP reference No.: 03001253
- Added to NRHP: December 5, 2003

The Huff Memorial Library is a historic library located at 320 South King Street in Jackson, Wyoming. The single-story log library was built by the Works Progress Administration between 1938 and 1940. The library replaced the city's first library, which had been established in St. John's House in 1915 but had become too small for the city by the 1930s. Jackson's Lions Club, along with several other community groups, began to work to bring a county library to the city. The WPA approved the city's proposal for a library in 1938, and it was built over the next two years. The library was named after Charles Huff, the city's only physician for over twenty years. The county library relocated to a new building in 1997, and the old library became a county office building.

The Huff Memorial Library should not be confused with the Teton County Library which is located on 125 Virginian Lane, Jackson Wyoming.

The library was added to the National Register of Historic Places on December 5, 2003.
