= George Washington Memorial Park (Jackson, Wyoming) =

- U.S. National Register of Historic Places
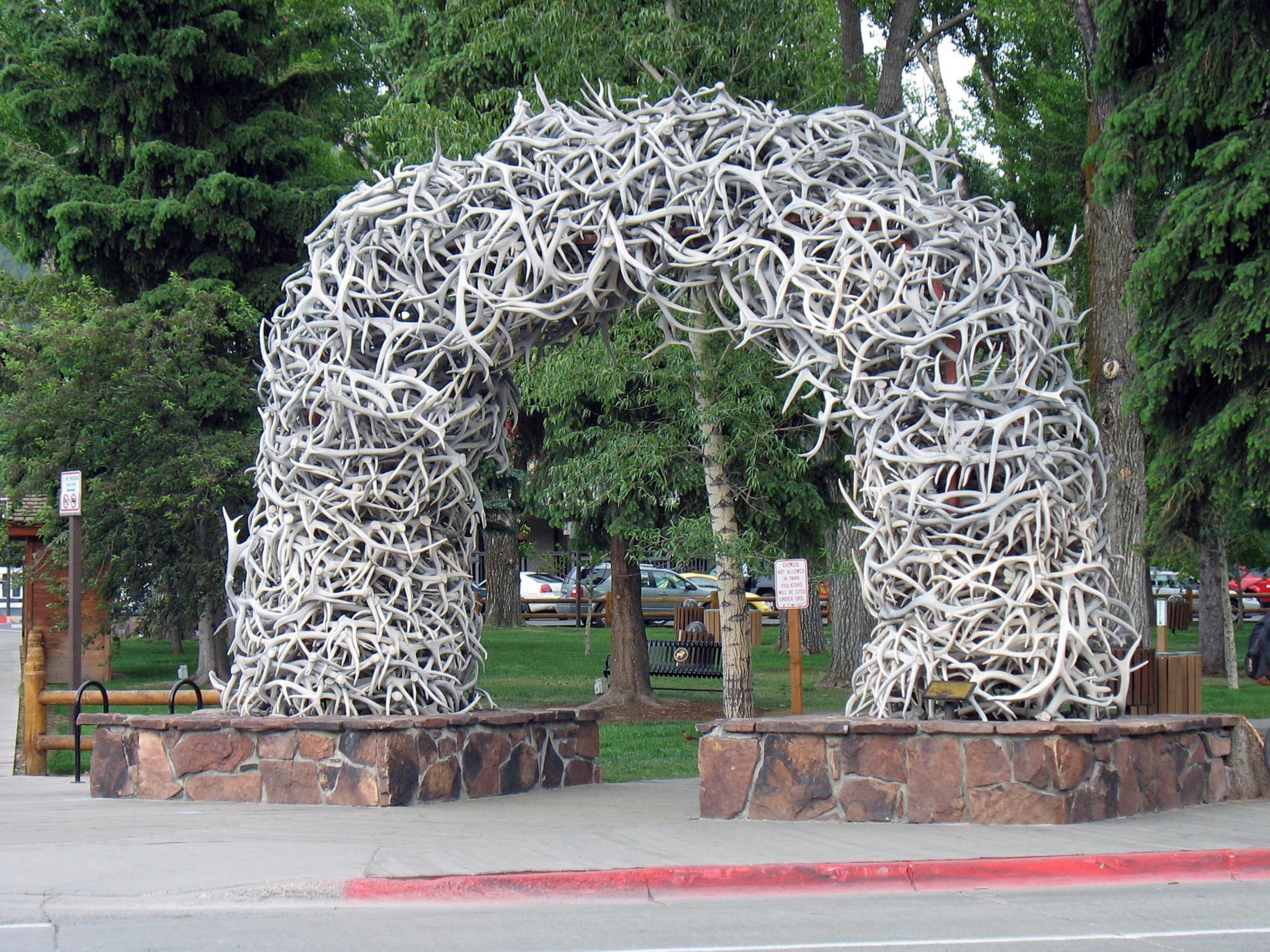

- Location within Wyoming Location within the United States
- Location: Jackson, Wyoming
- Coordinates: 43°28′48″N 110°45′42″W
- Built: 1934
- Architect: Harold L. Curtiss
- NRHP reference No.: 03001250
- Added to NRHP: December 5, 2003

George Washington Memorial Park is located at the center of Jackson, Wyoming. More generally known as "Town Square", the park is notable for its elk-antler arches at each corner of the park, collected from the nearby National Elk Refuge by Boy Scouts and periodically rebuilt. The square originally existed as an open space in the center of town that was made into a park in 1934. The park center also contains a stone memorial to John Colter.

The Town Square originated as an open space in the middle of Jackson where no buildings had yet been built, surrounded by more developed blocks in the sparsely settled street grid of the town. The area was used as a commons area by people and occasionally as a thoroughfare for migrating elk. In 1917 the town graded the surrounding street and obtained title to most of the land, using excess material from the grading to even out depressions in the square's surface. In 1924 the town undertook further improvements to the area, now called "the little park in the center of the town." The initiative yielded further grading. A few trees were planted, and were then indifferently maintained.

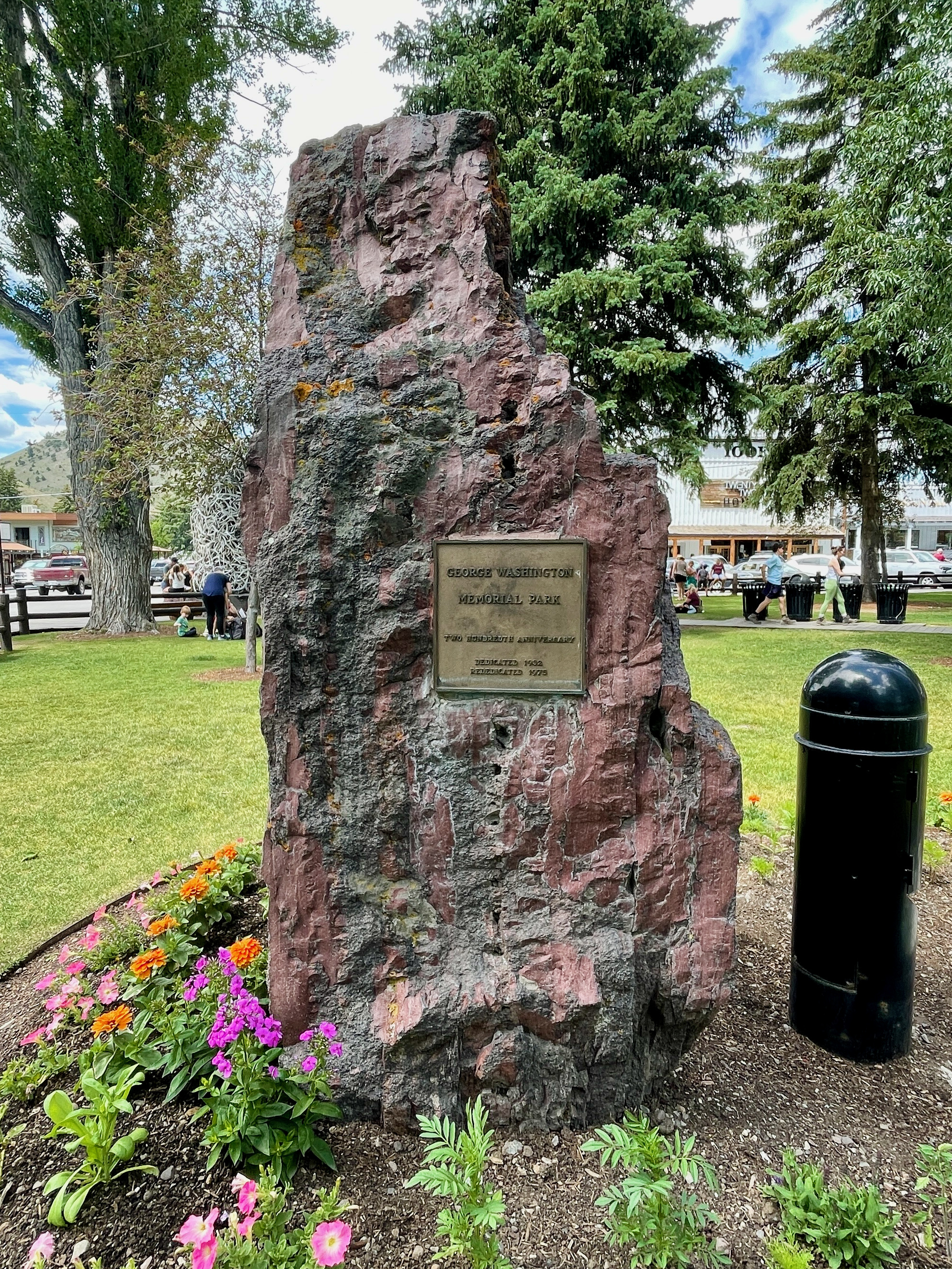
Boulder with two hundredth anniversary plaque

With the two hundredth anniversary of the birth of George Washington approaching in 1932, the state of Wyoming cooperated with Congress to prepare memorials throughout the state. The Wyoming plan was to establish a George Washington Memorial Park in as many communities as possible. The Town Square was designated the George Washington Memorial Park for Jackson in 1932. The organizing committee, which included Olaus Murie, raised the requisite $150 in public donations to landscape the park. Plantings were not ready until 1933. However, labor shortages remained a problem, and little work was accomplished. Jackson applied for and received $3092 from the New Deal Civil Works Administration, which allowed the town to organize a land transfer allowing the sole building on the square property, the Independent Order of Odd Fellows Hall, to move to another site. Altogether, more than $6000 in CWA funds were expended, just before the CWA was closed down in 1934.

In short order the Square became the center of Jackson's civic life. A memorial to John Colter was placed in the center of the park in 1939. In 1953 the local Rotary Club built an arch of elk antlers at the southwest corner of the park. Arches were erected at the remaining corners in 1966, 1967 and 1969.

In 1959 a house originally built by Charles Wort was moved onto the square, becoming known as the "Stage Stop." The move was unpopular and possibly illegal, but the building remained until 1995 when it was given to Wyoming Senator Alan Simpson, whose grandfather had used the building as a law office. A modern replacement was built in its stead. It was not until 1976 that a plaque was placed in the park for the United States Bicentennial naming the park "George Washington Memorial Park." Stone facings were added to the antler arches the same year.
