= Huff, North Dakota =

- Unincorporated community
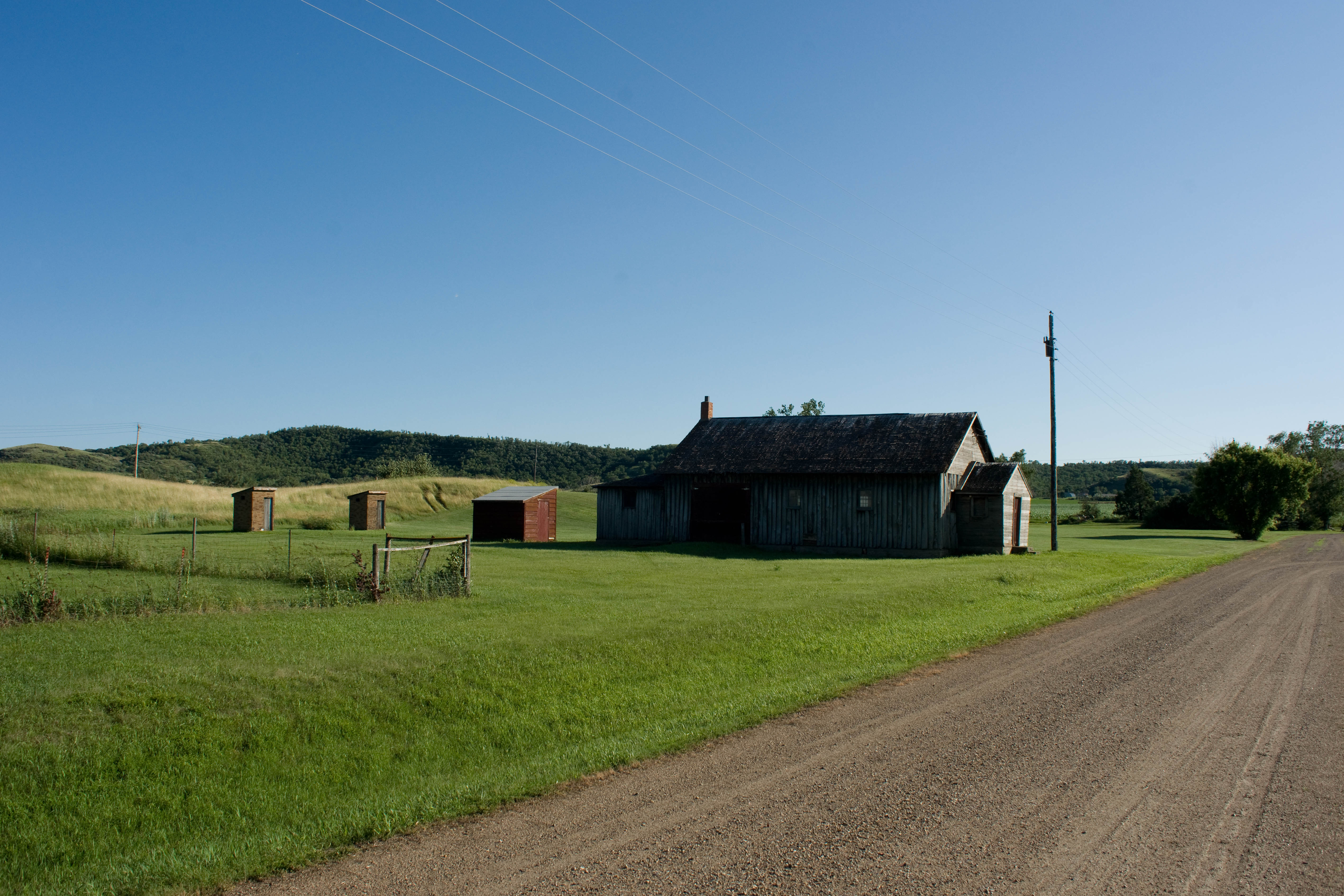

- Location within North Dakota Location within the United States
- Coordinates: 46°37′26″N 100°39′06″W
- Country: United States
- State: North Dakota
- County: Morton
- Elevation: 1,657 ft (505 m)
- Time zone: UTC-6 (Central (CST))
  - Summer (DST): UTC-5 (CDT)
- Area code: 701
- GNIS feature ID: 1029567

Huff is an unincorporated town in Morton County, North Dakota, United States. Huff is located about 20 miles south of Bismarck, North Dakota on the Missouri River at the top of Lake Oahe, a reservoir created by a dam. It is located on North Dakota Highway 1806. The Huff Archeological Site, a U.S. National Historic Landmark, is nearby to the southeast. As of 2018, the population is estimated to be less than 15, no businesses are currently in operation. Present at the townsite are the remains of a one-room school, an abandoned repair shop/gas station, a few occupied homes, and a restored stone church.
