= List of observatory codes =

This is a list of observatory codes (IAU codes or MPC codes) published by the Minor Planet Center. For a detailed description, see observations of small Solar System bodies.

== List ==
Obs. code Map	Observatories, programs, surveys, and dedicated telescopes	CTRY	Region	MPC description
000	Royal Observatory, Greenwich	(United Kingdom)	ENG	Greenwich
001	Isaac Roberts' Observatory	(United Kingdom)	ENG	Crowborough
002	Rayleigh Observatory, Chelmsford borough, Essex	(United Kingdom)	ENG	Rayleigh
003	Montpellier Observatory (Observatoire de la Babote; Montpellier Babote Observatory)	(France)	Occ	Montpellier
004	Toulouse Observatory	(France)	Occ	Toulouse
005	Paris Observatory (Observatoire de Paris; Observatoire de Paris-Meudon)	(France)	IDF	Meudon
006	Fabra Observatory (Observatori Fabra)	(Spain)	CT	Fabra Observatory, Barcelona
007	Paris Observatory (Observatoire de Paris; Observatoire de Paris-Meudon)	(France)	IDF	Paris
008	Algiers Observatory (Centre de Recherche en Astronomie Astrophysique et Géophysique)	(Algeria)	-	Algiers-Bouzareah
009	Uecht Observatory (Sternwarte Uecht, Solar Observatory at Uecht)	(Switzerland)	SWG	Bern-Uecht
010	CERGA Observatory (Centre de recherches en géodynamique et astrométrie)	(France)	PACA	Caussols
011	Wetzikon Observatory (Sternwarte Wetzikon)	(Switzerland)	SWG	Wetzikon
012	Royal Observatory of Belgium (Uccle Observatory; Observatoire Royal de Belgique; Koninklijke Sterrenwacht van België)	(Belgium)	BCR	Uccle
013	Leiden Observatory (Sterrewacht Leiden)	(Netherlands)	Zuid Holland	Leiden
014	Marseille Observatory	(France)	PACA	Marseille
015	Sonnenborgh Observatory	(Netherlands)	Utrecht	Utrecht
016	Besançon Astronomical Observatory (Observatoire de Besançon)	(France)	BFC	Besançon
017	Hoher List Observatory (Observatorium Hoher List)	(Germany)	RP	Hoher List
018	Düsseldorf-Bilk Observatory (Sternwarte Bilk)	(Germany)	NRW	Düsseldorf-Bilk
019	Neuchâtel Observatory	(Switzerland)	SWF	Neuchatel
020	Nice Observatory (Observatoire de Nice); observer: Matthieu Conjat	(France)	PACA	Nice
021	Karlsruhe Observatory (Sternwarte Karlsruhe)	(Germany)	BW	Karlsruhe
022	Observatory of Turin (Pino Torinese; Osservatorio Astronomico di Torino)	(Italy)	P	Pino Torinese
023	Wiesbaden Observatory (Sternwarte Wiesbaden)	(Germany)	HE	Wiesbaden
024	Heidelberg-Königstuhl State Observatory (Heidelberg Observatory; Landessternwarte Heidelberg-Königstuhl)	(Germany)	BW	Heidelberg-Konigstuhl
025	Stuttgart Observatory	(Germany)	BW	Stuttgart
026	Zimmerwald Observatory (Observatorium Zimmerwald)	(Switzerland)	SWG	Bern-Zimmerwald
027	Brera Astronomical Observatory (Osservatorio Astronomico di Brera)	(Italy)	Lo	Milan
028	Würzburg Observatory (Sternwarte der Universität Würzburg)	(Germany)	FB	Würzburg
029	Hamburg Observatory (Bergedorf Observatory; Hamburger Sternwarte)	(Germany)	H	Hamburg-Bergedorf
030	Arcetri Observatory (Osservatorio Astrofisico di Arcetri)	(Italy)	Tu	Arcetri Observatory, Florence
031	Sonneberg Observatory	(Germany)	TH	Sonneberg
032	Jena Observatory (Astrophysikalisches Institut und Universitäts-Sternwarte Jena)	(Germany)	TH	Jena
033	Karl Schwarzschild Observatory (Karl-Schwarzschild-Observatorium)	(Germany)	TH	Karl Schwarzschild Observatory, Tautenburg
034	Monte Mario Observatory (Osservatorio Astronomico di Roma Sede di Monte Mario)	(Italy)	La	Monte Mario Observatory, Rome
035	Østervold Observatory (Copenhagen University Observatory; Københavns Universitet Astronomisk Observatorium)	(Denmark)	-	Copenhagen
036	Vatican Observatory (Specola Vaticana)	(Vatican City)	-	Castel Gandolfo
037	Collurania-Teramo Observatory (Osservatorio Astronomico di Collurania-Teramo)	(Italy)	Ab	Collurania Observatory, Teramo
038	Astronomical Observatory of Trieste (Osservatorio Astronomico di Trieste)	(Italy)	F	Trieste
039	Lund Observatory (Lunds Universitet Institutionen för astronomi)	(Sweden)	Skåne	Lund
040	Lohrmann Observatory	(Germany)	SN	Dresden University of Technology
041	Innsbruck Observatory	(Austria)	Ty	Innsbruck
042	Einstein Tower	(Germany)	BB	Potsdam
043	Asiago Astrophysical Observatory (Osservatorio Astrofisico di Asiago)	(Italy)	V	Asiago Astrophysical Observatory, Padua
044	Astronomical Observatory of Capodimonte (Osservatorio Astronomico di Capodimonte)	(Italy)	Cam	Capodimonte Observatory, Naples
045	Vienna Observatory (since 1879) (Universitäts-Sternwarte Wien)	(Austria)	Vi	Vienna (since 1879)
046	Kleť Observatory, České Budějovice (Hvězdárna Kleť)	(Czech Republic)	JC	Kleť Observatory, České Budějovice
047	Poznań Observatory (Obserwatorium Astronomiczne Uniwersytet im. Adama Mickiewicza w Poznaniu)	(Poland)	WV	Poznań
048	Hradec Králové Observatory (Hvězdárna Hradec Králové)	(Czech Republic)	Hradec Králové	Hradec Králové
049	Kvistaberg Observatory	(Sweden)	Up	Uppsala-Kvistaberg
050	Stockholm Observatory (before 1931) (Stockholms observatorium)	(Sweden)	Sö	Stockholm (before 1931)
051	Royal Observatory, Cape of Good Hope	(South Africa)	WC	Cape
052	Stockholm Observatory (since 1931) (Saltsjöbaden Observatory)	(Sweden)	Sö	Stockholm-Saltsjobaden
053	Konkoly Observatory (Konkoly Obszervatórium)	(Hungary)	Budapest	Konkoly Observatory, Budapest (since 1934)
054	Brorfelde Observatory (Brorfelde Observatoriet)	(Denmark)	-	Brorfelde
055	Kraków Observatory	(Poland)	LPV	Cracow
056	Skalnaté pleso Observatory (Observatórium Skalnaté pleso)	(Slovakia)	Prešov	Skalnate Pleso
057	Belgrade Observatory	(Serbia)	-	Belgrade
058	Königsberg Observatory (before 1944)	(German Empire) (Russia)	Kaliningrad	Kaliningrad
059	Lomnický štít Observatory (Observatórium Lomnický štít)	(Slovakia)	Prešov	Lomnicky Stit
060	Warsaw University Observatory	(Poland)	MV	Warsaw-Ostrowik
061	Uzhhorod Observatory	(Ukraine)	Zakarpattia	Uzhhorod
062	Iso-Heikkilä Observatory (Turku Observatory; Turun observatorio)	(Finland)	SW	Turku
063	Tuorla Observatory (Turku-Tuorla; Tuorlan observatorio)	(Finland)	SW	Turku-Tuorla
064	Kevola Observatory (Turku-Kevola; Kevolan tähtitorni)	(Finland)	SW	Turku-Kevola
065	Traunstein Observatory	(Germany)	FB	Traunstein
066	National Observatory of Athens	(Greece)	-	Athens
067	Astronomical Observatory of Lviv University	(Ukraine)	Lviv	Lviv University Observatory
068	Lviv Polytechnic Institute	(Ukraine)	Lviv	Lviv Polytechnic Institute
069	Baldone, near Riga	(Latvia)	-	Baldone
070	Vilnius Observatory (before 1939)	(Russia) (Poland)	Vilnius	Vilnius (before 1939)
071	Rozhen Observatory or Bulgarian National Astronomical Observatory	(Bulgaria)	-	NAO Rozhen, Smolyan
072	Scheuren Observatory	(Germany)	NRW	Scheuren Observatory
073	Bucharest Astronomical Observatory	(Romania)	-	Bucharest
074	Boyden Observatory	(South Africa)	Free State	Boyden Observatory, Bloemfontein
075	University of Tartu Old Observatory active until 1964 (formerly Dorpat Observatory until 1919; not to be confused with modern Tartu Observatory, see L75)	(Estonia)	Tartu	Tartu
076	Johannesburg-Hartbeespoort Observatory (Union Observatory Annex), Hartbeespoort	(South Africa)	North West	Johannesburg-Hartbeespoort
077	Yale-Columbia Southern Station (1925–1951)	(South Africa)	Gauteng	Yale-Columbia Station, Johannesburg
078	Union Observatory (Johannesburg Observatory; Republic Observatory; Transvaal Observatory)	(South Africa)	Gauteng	Johannesburg
079	Radcliffe Observatory	(South Africa)	Gauteng	Radcliffe Observatory, Pretoria
080	Istanbul Observatory	(Turkey)	-	Istanbul
081	Leiden Southern Station, Hartbeespoort (Leiden Station, Johannesburg)	(South Africa)	North West	Leiden Station, Johannesburg
082	St. Pölten Observatory	(Austria)	LA	St. Polten
083	Main Astronomical Observatory	(Ukraine)	Kyiv	Holosiivskyi District, Kyiv
084	Pulkovo Observatory	(Russia)	Saint Petersburg	Pulkovo
085	Kyiv Observatory	(Ukraine)	Kyiv	Kyiv
086	Odesa Observatory	(Ukraine)	-	Odesa
087	Helwan Observatory	(Egypt)	-	Helwan
088	Kottomia Observatory	(Egypt)	-	Kottomia
089	Mykolaiv Observatory	(Ukraine)	Mykolaiv	Mykolaiv
090	Mainz Observatory	(Germany)	RP	Mainz
091	Nurol Observatory (Observatoire de Nurol)	(France)	ARA	Observatoire de Nurol, Aurec sur Loire
092	Toruń Centre for Astronomy (Piwnice Astronomical Observatory; Piwnice Obserwatorium Astronomiczne)	(Poland)	KPV	Torun-Piwnice
093	Skibotn Observatory	(Norway)	-	Skibotn
094	Simeiz Observatory	(Ukraine)	-	Crimea-Simeis
095	1. Crimean Astrophysical Observatory; 2. Crimean Astronomical Station of the Sternberg Astronomical Institute; 3. Gennadiy Borisov's observatory until it received its own code L51	(Ukraine)	-	Crimea-Nauchnij
096	Merate Observatory	(Italy)	Lo	Merate
097	Wise Observatory	(Israel)	-	Wise Observatory, Mitzpeh Ramon
098	Cima Ekar Observing Station (Stazione osservativa di Asiago Cima Ekar; also see #043 and #209)	(Italy)	V	Asiago Observatory, Cima Ekar
099	Lahti Ursa Observatory (Lahden Ursan tähtitorni)	(Finland)	Päijät-Häme	Lahti
100	Ähtäri Observatory	(Finland)	South Ostrobothnia	Ahtari
101	Kharkiv Observatory (Astronomical Observatory of Kharkiv National University, ХАО)	(Ukraine)	Kharkiv	Kharkiv
102	Zvenigorod Observatory	(Russia)	Moscow	Zvenigorod
103	Ljubljana Observatory	(Slovenia)	Ljubljana	Ljubljana
104	Pistoia Mountains Astronomical Observatory (San Marcello Pistoiese; Osservatorio Astronomico della Montagna Pistoiese; Osservatorio di Pian dei Termini, Pian dei Termini Observatory)	(Italy)	Tu	San Marcello Pistoiese
105	Moscow Observatory	(Russia)	Moscow	Moscow
106	Črni Vrh Observatory (Observatorij Črni Vrh)	(Slovenia)	Primorska	Crni Vrh
107	Cavezzo Observatory, (Osservatorio Astronomico "Geminiamo Montanari")	(Italy)	ER	Cavezzo
108	Montelupo Observatory	(Italy)	Tu	Montelupo
109	Kouba Observatory	(Algeria)	-	Algiers-Kouba
110	Rostov Observatory	(Russia)	Yaroslavl	Rostov
111	Piazzano Observatory	(Italy)	Tu	Piazzano Observatory, Florence
112	Pleiade Observatory	(Italy)	V	Pleiade Observatory, Verona
113	Drebach Observatory (Volkssternwarte Drebach), Schönbrunn	(Germany)	SN	Volkssternwarte Drebach, Schoenbrunn
114	Zelenchukskaya Station of the Engelhardt Observatory (see #136), Kazan University Observatory	(Russia)	Karachay-Cherkessia	Engelhardt Observatory, Zelenchukskaya Station
115	Special Astrophysical Observatory (SAO) (also see #114)	(Russia)	Karachay-Cherkessia	Zelenchukskaya
116	Giesing Observatory, München-Giesing	(Germany)	FB	Giesing
117	Sendling Observatory, Munich	(Germany)	FB	Sendling
118	Modra Observatory (Astronomické observatórium Modra; Astronomical and Geophysical Observatory, Modra)	(Slovakia)	Bratislava	Astronomical and Geophysical Observatory, Modra
119	Abastuman Observatory	(Georgia (country))	-	Abastuman
120	Višnjan Observatory (Zvjezdarnica Višnjan)	(Croatia)	-	Visnjan
121	Chuhuiv Observational Station	(Ukraine)	Kharkiv	Chuhuiv Raion, Kharkiv Oblast
122	Pises Observatory (Observatoire des Pises)	(France)	Occ	Pises Observatory
123	Byurakan Observatory	(Armenia)	-	Byurakan
124	Castres Observatory (Observatoire de Castres)	(France)	Occ	Castres
125	Tbilisi Observatory	(Georgia (country))	-	Tbilisi
126	Monte Viseggi Observatory (Osservatorio Astronomico di Monte Viseggi), obs.: Giulio Scarfì	(Italy)	Li	Monte Viseggi
127	Bornheim Observatory	(Germany)	NRW	Bornheim
128	Saratov Observatory of the Saratov State University	(Russia)	Saratov	Saratov
129	Ordubad Observatory	(Azerbaijan)	-	Ordubad
130	Lumezzane Observatory (Osservatorio Astronomico Serafino Zani)	(Italy)	Lo	Lumezzane
131	Observatoire de l'Ardèche	(France)	ARA	Observatoire de l'Ardeche
132	Bédoin Observatory (Observatoire de Bédoin); observer: Pierre Antonini	(France)	PACA	Bedoin
133	Les Tardieux Observatory; observer: Michel Bœuf	(France)	PACA	Les Tardieux
134	Großschwabhausen University Observatory	(Germany)	TH	Groszschwabhausen
135	Kasan Observatory	(Russia)	Tatarstan	Kasan
136	Engelhardt Observatory of the Kazan University Observatory	(Russia)	Tatarstan	Engelhardt Observatory, Kasan
137	Givatayim Observatory	(Israel)	-	Givatayim Observatory
138	Village-Neuf Observatory	(France)	GE	Village-Neuf
139	Antibes Observatory; observer: Laurent Brunetto	(France)	PACA	Antibes
140	Augerolles Observatory	(France)	ARA	Augerolles
141	Hottviller Observatory (Observatoire de Hottviller)	(France)	GE	Hottviller
142	Sinsen Observatory	(Germany)	NRW	Sinsen
143	Gnosca Observatory (Osservatorio Astronomico di Gnosca; observer: Stefano Sposetti)	(Switzerland)	SWI	Gnosca
144	Bray et Lu Observatory	(France)	IDF	Bray et Lu
145	's-Gravenwezel Observatory	(Belgium)	VLG	's-Gravenwezel
146	Frignano Observatory	(Italy)	-	Frignano
147	Suno Observatory (Osservatorio Astronomico di Suno; Osservatorio Astronomico Galileo Galilei)	(Italy)	P	Osservatorio Astronomico di Suno
148	Guitalens Observatory (Observatoire de Guitalens; observer: Alain Klotz)	(France)	Occ	Guitalens
149	Beine-Nauroy Observatory	(France)	GE	Beine-Nauroy
150	Maisons Laffitte Observatory	(France)	IDF	Maisons Laffitte
151	Eschenberg Observatory (Sternwarte Eschenberg)	(Switzerland)	SWG	Eschenberg Observatory, Winterthur
152	Moletai Astronomical Observatory (MAO)	(Lithuania)	-	Moletai Astronomical Observatory
153	Stuttgart-Hoffeld Observatory	(Germany)	BW	Stuttgart-Hoffeld
154	Cortina Observatory (Associazione Astronomica Cortina; Osservatorio Astronomico del Col Drusciè "Helmut Ullrich"), Cortina d'Ampezzo	(Italy)	V	Cortina
155	Ole Rømer Observatory	(Denmark)	-	Ole Romer Observatory, Aarhus
156	Catania Astrophysical Observatory	(Italy)	Si	Catania Astrophysical Observatory
157	Frasso Sabino Observatory (Osservatorio Astronomico Virginio Cesarini – Frasso Sabino)	(Italy)	La	Frasso Sabino
158	Promiod Observatory (Osservatorio Dalai Lama di Promiod)	(Italy)	Ao	Promiod
159	Monte Agliale Observatory (Osservatorio Astronomico di Monte Agliale)	(Italy)	Tu	Monte Agliale
160	Castelmartini Observatory (Osservatorio Astronomico di Castelmartini, owner: E. Prosperi)	(Italy)	Tu	Castelmartini
161	Cerrina Tololo Observatory	(Italy)	P	Cerrina Tololo Observatory
162	Potenza Observatory	(Italy)	B	Potenza
163	Roeser Observatory	(Luxembourg)	-	Roeser Observatory, Luxembourg
164	St. Michel sur Meurthe Observatory	(France)	GE	St. Michel sur Meurthe
165	Piera Observatory (Observatori Astronomic de Piera)	(Spain)	CT	Piera Observatory, Barcelona
166	Úpice Observatory (Hvězdárna v Úpici)	(Czech Republic)	Hradec Králové	Úpice
167	Bülach Observatory (Sternwarte Bülach)	(Switzerland)	SWG	Bulach Observatory
168	Kourovskaya Observatory	(Russia)	Sverdlovsk	Kourovskaya
169	Airali Observatory	(Italy)	P	Airali Observatory
170	Begues Observatory (Observatorio de Begues)	(Spain)	CT	Observatorio de Begues
171	Flarestar Observatory	(Malta)	-	Flarestar Observatory, San Gwann
172	Onnens Observatory	(Switzerland)	SWF	Onnens
173	St Clotilde Observatory (Observatoire Sainte-Clotilde)	(France) (Réunion)	Réunion	St. Clotilde, Reunion
174	Nyrölä Observatory (Nyrölän observatorio), Jyväskylä	(Finland)	CF	Nyrola Observatory, Jyvaskyla
175	Bagnoud Observatory	(Switzerland)	SWF	F.-X. Bagnoud Observatory, St-Luc
176	Consell Observatory (Observatorio Astronómico de Consell)	(Spain)	IB	Observatorio Astronomico de Consell
177	Le Cres Observatory, observer: Raymond Poncy	(France)	Occ	Le Cres
178	Collonges Observatory, observer: Jean-Gabriel Bosch	(France)	ARA	Collonges
179	Monte Generoso Observatory (Osservatorio del Monte Generoso)	(Switzerland)	SWI	Monte Generoso
180	Mauguio Observatory	(France)	Occ	Mauguio
181	Makes Observatory (Observatoire des Makes; observers: Jean-Paul Teng, Andre Peyrot, Alain Klotz)	(France) (Réunion)	Réunion	Observatoire des Makes, Saint-Louis
182	St Paul Observatory	(France) (Réunion)	Réunion	St. Paul, Reunion
183	Starlab Observatory	(Russia)	Karachay-Cherkessia	Starlab Observatory, Karachay-Cherkessia
184	Valmeca Observatory	(France)	PACA	Valmeca Observatory, Puimichel
185	Jura Observatory (Observatoire astronomique jurassien)	(Switzerland)	SWF	Observatoire Astronomique Jurassien-Vicques
186	Kitab Observatory, Mt. Maydanak	(Uzbekistan)	Kashkadarya	Kitab
187	Borowiec Astrogeodynamic Observatory	(Poland)	WV	Astronomical Observatory, Borowiec
188	Majdanak Observatory	(Uzbekistan)	Kashkadarya	Majdanak
189	Geneva Observatory (old observatory; before 1967)	(Switzerland)	SWF	Geneva (before 1967)
190	Gissar Observatory	(Tajikistan)	RR	Gissar
191	Dushanbe Observatory	(Tajikistan)	RR	Dushanbe
192	Tashkent Observatory	(Uzbekistan)	Tashkent	Tashkent
193	Sanglok Observatory	(Tajikistan)	Khatlon	Sanglok
194	Tivoli Observatory	(Namibia)	-	Tivoli
195	Untermenzing Observatory	(Germany)	FB	Untermenzing Observatory, Munich
196	Homburg-Erbach Observatory	(Germany)	SL	Homburg-Erbach
197	Bastia Observatory	(Italy)	ER	Bastia
198	Wildberg Observatory (Observatorium Wildberg)	(Germany)	BW	Wildberg
199	Buthiers Observatory (Observatoire de Buthiers)	(France)	CVL	Buthiers
200	Beersel Hills Observatory	(Belgium)	VLG	Beersel Hills Observatory
201	Jonathan B. Postel Observatory, Promiod	(Italy)	Ao	Jonathan B. Postel Observatory
202	Tamaris Observatoire	(France)	PACA	Tamaris Observatoire, La Seyne sur Mer
203	GiaGa Observatory	(Italy)	Lo	GiaGa Observatory
204	Schiaparelli Observatory	(Italy)	Lo	Schiaparelli Observatory
205	Osservatorio Casalecchio di Reno	(Italy)	ER	Obs. Casalecchio di Reno, Bologna
206	Haagaar Observatory	(Norway)	-	Haagaar Observatory, Eina
207	Osservatorio Antonio Grosso	(Italy)	Lo	Osservatorio Antonio Grosso
208	Rivalta Observatory	(Italy)	ER	Rivalta
209	Asiago-DLR Asteroid Survey (ADAS) at the Cima Ekar Station (#098) of the Asiago Observatory (#043)	(Italy)	V	Asiago Observatory, Cima Ekar-ADAS
210	Almaty Observatory (Alma-Ata Observatory)	(Kazakhstan)	-	Alma-Ata
211	Scandicci Observatory	(Italy)	Tu	Scandicci
212	La Dehesilla Observatory (Observatorio La Dehesilla)	(Italy) (Spain)	AN	Observatorio La Dehesilla
213	Montcabre Observatory (Observatorio Montcabre)	(Italy) (Spain)	CT	Observatorio Montcabre
214	Garching Observatory	(Germany)	FB	Garching Observatory
215	Buchloe Observatory	(Germany)	FB	Buchloe
216	Côtes de Meuse Observatory (Observatoire des Côtes de Meuse)	(France)	GE	Observatoire des Cote de Meuse
217	Assy Observatory	(Kazakhstan)	-	Assy-Turgen
218	Hyderabad observatory	(India)	-	Hyderabad
219	Japal-Rangapur Observatory	(India)	-	Japal-Rangapur
220	Vainu Bappu Observatory	(India)	-	Vainu Bappu Observatory, Kavalur
221	IAS Observatory (IAS), Hakos location	(Namibia)	-	IAS Observatory, Hakos
222	Yerres-Canotiers Observatory	(France)	IDF	Yerres-Canotiers
223	Madras Observatory (Indian Institute of Astrophysics)	(India)	-	Madras
224	Ottmarsheim Observatory (Observatoire d'Ottmarsheim), observer: Claudine Rinner	(France)	GE	Ottmarsheim
225	Northwood Ridge Observatory, Northwood	(United States)	NH	Northwood Ridge Observatory
226	Guido Ruggieri Observatory	(Italy)	V	Guido Ruggieri Observatory, Padua
227	OrbitJet Observatory	(United States)	NY	OrbitJet Observatory, Colden
228	Bruno Zugna Observatory	(Italy)	F	Bruno Zugna Observatory, Trieste
229	G. C. Gloriosi Astronomical Observatory	(Italy)	Cam	G. C. Gloriosi Astronomical Observatory, Salerno
230	Mount Wendelstein Observatory	(Germany)	FB	Mt. Wendelstein Observatory
231	Vesqueville Observatory	(Belgium)	WAL	Vesqueville
232	Masquefa Observatory	(Spain)	CT	Masquefa Observatory
233	Sauro Donati Astronomical Observatory	(Italy)	Tu	Sauro Donati Astronomical Observatory, San Vito
234	Coddenham Observatory	(United Kingdom)	ENG	Coddenham Observatory
235	CAST Observatory	(Italy)	F	CAST Observatory, Talmassons
236	Tomsk Observatory	(Russia)	Tomsk	Tomsk
237	Baugy Observatory	(France)	CVL	Baugy
238	Grorudalen Optical Observatory	(Norway)	-	Grorudalen Optical Observatory
239	Michael Adrian Observatory	(Germany)	HE	Trebur
240	Herrenberg Observatory (Herrenberg Sternwarte) at Herrenberg	(Germany)	BW	Herrenberg Sternwarte
241	Schaerding Observatory	(Austria)	UA	Schaerding
242	Varennes Observatory	(France)	Occ	Varennes
243	Umbrella Observatory	(Germany)	NI	Umbrella Observatory, Fredenbeck
244	Geocentric Occultation Observation	SPACE	geocentric	Geocentric Occultation Observation
245	Spitzer Space Telescope	SPACE	Earth-trailing	Spitzer Space Telescope
246	Kleť Observatory near Earth and other unusual objects observations team and telescope (KLENOT) at Kleť Observatory (#046)	(Czech Republic)	JC	Kleť Observatory-KLENOT
247	Roving Observer	-	geocentric	Roving Observer
248	Hipparcos	SPACE	geostationary	Hipparcos
249	SOHO	SPACE	L_{1}	SOHO
250	Hubble Space Telescope	SPACE	LEO	Hubble Space Telescope
251	Arecibo Observatory	(United States)	PR	Arecibo
252	Goldstone DSS 13, at Goldstone Deep Space Communications Complex	(United States)	CA	Goldstone DSS 13, Fort Irwin
253	Goldstone DSS 14, at Goldstone Deep Space Communications Complex	(United States)	CA	Goldstone DSS 14, Fort Irwin
254	Haystack Observatory	(United States)	MA	Haystack, Westford
255	Evpatoria Observatory	(Republic of Crimea (Russia))	-	Evpatoria
256	Green Bank Telescope	(United States)	WV	Green Bank
257	Goldstone DSS 25, at Goldstone Deep Space Communications Complex	(United States)	CA	Goldstone DSS 25, Fort Irwin
258	Gaia space observatory	SPACE	L_{2}	Gaia
259	EISCAT Tromso UHF	(Norway)	-	EISCAT Tromso UHF
260	Digitized Sky Survey (DSS) at Siding Spring Observatory (see #413)	(Australia)	NSW	Siding Spring Observatory-DSS
261	Digitized Sky Survey (DSS) at Palomar Observatory (see #675)	(United States)	CA	Palomar Mountain-DSS
262	Digitized Sky Survey (DSS) at ESA's La Silla see #809	(Chile)	Co	European Southern Observatory, La Silla-DSS
266	New Horizons KBO Search with the Subaru Telescope	(United States)	HI	New Horizons KBO Search-Subaru
267	New Horizons KBO Search with the Canada–France–Hawaii Telescope	(United States)	HI	New Horizons KBO Search-CFHT
268	New Horizons KBO Search with the Magellan II (Clay) telescope	(Chile)	Af	New Horizons KBO Search-Magellan/Clay
269	New Horizons KBO Search with the Magellan I (Baade) telescope	(Chile)	Af	New Horizons KBO Search-Magellan/Baade
270	Unistellar Network, (also see #247 and)	-	geocentric	Unistellar Network, Roving Observer
276	Plonsk Observatory, Płońsk	(Poland)	-	Plonsk
277	Royal Observatory, Edinburgh (ROE)	(United Kingdom)	SCT	Royal Observatory, Blackford Hill, Edinburgh
278	Peking, Transit of Venus site	(China)	Beijing	Peking, Transit of Venus site
279	Seeberg Observatory, Gotha (1787–1857)	(Germany)	TH	Seeberg Observatory, Gotha (1787-1857)
280	Lilienthal Observatory	(Germany)	SH	Lilienthal
281	Bologna Observatory	(Italy)	ER	Bologna
282	Nîmes Observatory	(France)	Occ	Nîmes
283	Bremen Observatory	(Germany)	HB	Bremen
284	Driesen Observatory, formerly Germany	(Poland)	LV	Driesen
285	Flammarion Observatory	(France)	IDF	Flammarion Observatory, Juvisy
286	Yunnan Observatory	(China)	Yunnan	Yunnan Observatory
290	Vatican Advanced Technology Telescope (VATT) at Mount Graham (also see #G83)	(United States)	AZ	Mt. Graham-VATT
291	LPL/Spacewatch II (; also see #691)	(United States)	AZ	LPL/Spacewatch II
292	Burlington Observatory	(United States)	NJ	Burlington, New Jersey
293	Burlington remote site Observatory	(United States)	NJ	Burlington remote site
294	Astrophysical Observatory, College of Staten Island	(United States)	NY	Astrophysical Obs., College of Staten Island
295	Catholic University Observatory	(United States)	DC	Catholic University Observatory, Washington
296	Dudley Observatory (after 1893), Schenectady	(United States)	NY	Dudley Observatory, Albany (after 1893)
297	Middlebury College Observatory of Middlebury College	(United States)	VT	Middlebury
298	Van Vleck Observatory, Middletown	(United States)	CT	Van Vleck Observatory
299	Bosscha Observatory, Bandung	(Indonesia)	-	Bosscha Observatory, Lembang
300	Bisei Spaceguard Center – BATTeRS	(Japan)	33	Bisei Spaceguard Center-BATTeRS
301	Observatoire du Mont Mégantic	(Canada)	QC	Mont Megantic
302	University of the Andes, Venezuela station (not built)	(Venezuela)	Mérida	University of the Andes station
303	Llano del Hato National Astronomical Observatory (Observatorio Astronómico Nacional de Llano del Hato)	(Venezuela)	Mérida	OAN de Llano del Hato, Mérida
304	Las Campanas Observatory	(Chile)	Af	Las Campanas Observatory
305	Hainan Island Station – (of the Purple Mountain Obs.; see #330)	(China)	Shaanxi	Purple Mountain, Hainan Island station
306	Taya Beixo Observatory	(Venezuela)	Lara	Observatorio Taya Beixo, Barquisimeto
307	Shattuck Observatory	(United States)	NH	Shattuck Observatory, Hanover
309	Paranal Observatory	(Chile)	Af	Cerro Paranal
310	Minor Planet Center – Test Code	(United States)	MA	Minor Planet Center Test Code
312	Tsingtao field Station, Xisha Islands	(Taiwan)	Kaohsiung	Tsingtao field station, Xisha Islands
318	Quinns Rock Observatory	(Australia)	WA	Quinns Rock
319	Perth Observatory, Perth-Lowell Telescope	(Australia)	WA	Perth Observatory, Perth-Lowell Telescope
320	Chiro Observatory	(Australia)	WA	Chiro Observatory
321	Craigie Observatory	(Australia)	WA	Craigie
322	Perth Observatory, (Bickley-MCT)	(Australia)	WA	Perth Observatory, Bickley-MCT
323	Perth Observatory, (Bickley)	(Australia)	WA	Perth Observatory, Bickley
324	Shaho Station of the Beijing Astronomical Observatory	(China)	Beijing	Peking Observatory, Shaho Station
327	Xinglong Station (NAOC) of the Beijing Astronomical Obs.	(China)	Hebei	Peking Observatory, Xinglong Station
330	Purple Mountain Observatory	(China)	Jiangsu	Purple Mountain Observatory, Nanking
333	Desert Eagle Observatory	(United States)	AZ	Desert Eagle Observatory
334	Tsingtao Observatory	(China)	Shandong	Tsingtao
337	Sheshan Observatory, formerly Zô-Sé	(China)	Shanghai	Sheshan, formerly Zo-Se
340	Toyonaka Observatory	(Japan)	27	Toyonaka
341	Akashina Observatory	(Japan)	20	Akashina
342	Shishikui Observatory	(Japan)	36	Shishikui
343	Younchun Observatory	(South Korea)	Gyeonggi	Younchun
344	Bohyunsan Optical Astronomy Observatory (BOAO)	(South Korea)	North Gyeongsang	Bohyunsan Optical Astronomy Observatory
345	Sobaeksan Optical Astronomy Observatory	(South Korea)	North Chungcheong	Sobaeksan Optical Astronomy Observatory
346	KNUE Astronomical Observatory	(South Korea)	Sejong-si	KNUE Astronomical Observatory
347	Utsunomiya-Imaizumi Observatory	(Japan)	-	Utsunomiya-Imaizumi
348	Ayabe Observatory	(Japan)	26	Ayabe
349	Ageo Observatory	(Japan)	11	Ageo
350	Kurohone Observatory	(Japan)	10	Kurohone
351	Sakamoto Observatory	(Japan)	25	Sakamoto
352	Konan Observatory	(Japan)	25	Konan
353	Nishi Kobe Observatory	(Japan)	28	Nishi Kobe
354	Kawachi Observatory	(Japan)	09	Kawachi
355	Hadano Observatory	(Japan)	14	Hadano
356	Kogota Observatory	(Japan)	04	Kogota
357	Shimotsuma Observatory	(Japan)	08	Shimotsuma
358	Nanyo Observatory	(Japan)	06	Nanyo
359	Wakayama Observatory	(Japan)	30	Wakayama
360	Kuma Kogen Astronomical Observatory	(Japan)	38	Kuma Kogen
361	Sumoto Observatory	(Japan)	28	Sumoto
362	Ray Observatory	(Japan)	01	Ray Observatory
363	Yamada Observatory	(Japan)	40	Yamada
364	YCPM Kagoshima Station	(Japan)	46	YCPM Kagoshima Station
365	Uto Observatory, Kashihara, Nara	(Japan)	29	Uto Observatory
366	Miyasaka Observatory	(Japan)	19	Miyasaka Observatory
367	Yatsuka Observatory	(Japan)	32	Yatsuka
368	Ochiai Observatory	(Japan)	19	Ochiai
369	Chichibu Astronomical Observatory, Naoto Satō	(Japan)	11	Chichibu
370	Kochi Observatory	(Japan)	39	Kochi
371	Tokyo-Okayama (Okayama Astrophysical Observatory; OAO) of the Tokyo Observatory	(Japan)	33	Tokyo-Okayama
372	Geisei Observatory	(Japan)	39	Geisei
373	Oishi Observatory	(Japan)	30	Oishi
374	Minami-Oda Observatory	(Japan)	28	Minami-Oda Observatory
375	Uzurano Observatory	(Japan)	28	Uzurano
376	Uenohara Observatory	(Japan)	19	Uenohara
377	Kwasan Observatory, Kyoto University (Kwasan and Hida Observatories)	(Japan)	26	Kwasan Observatory, Kyoto
378	Murou Observatory	(Japan)	29	Murou
379	Hamamatsu-Yuto Observatory	(Japan)	22	Hamamatsu-Yuto
380	Ishiki Observatory	(Japan)	23	Ishiki
381	Kiso Observatory, University of Tokyo	(Japan)	20	Tokyo-Kiso
382	Norikura Observatory, of Tokyo Astronomical Observatory	(Japan)	13	Tokyo-Norikura
383	Chirorin Observatory	(Japan)	20	Chirorin
384	Shimada Observatory	(Japan)	22	Shimada
385	Nihondaira Observatory	(Japan)	22	Nihondaira Observatory
386	Yatsugatake-Kobuchizawa	(Japan)	19	Yatsugatake-Kobuchizawa
387	Dodaira Observatory of Tokyo Astronomical Obs.	(Japan)	11	Tokyo-Dodaira
388	Mitaka Observatory, Mitaka, Tokyo (of National Astronomical Observatory)	(Japan)	13	Tokyo-Mitaka
389	Tokyo Astronomical Observatory (before 1938)	(Japan)	13	Tokyo (before 1938)
390	Utsunomiya Observatory	(Japan)	09	Utsunomiya
391	Ayashi Station of the Sendai Obs.	(Japan)	04	Sendai Observatory, Ayashi Station
392	JCPM Sapporo Station	(Japan)	01	JCPM Sapporo Station
393	JCPM Sakura Station	(Japan)	08	JCPM Sakura Station
394	JCPM Hamatonbetsu Station	(Japan)	01	JCPM Hamatonbetsu Station
395	Tokyo-Asahikawa	(Japan)	01	Tokyo-Asahikawa
396	Asahikawa Observatory	(Japan)	01	Asahikawa
397	Sapporo Science Center	(Japan)	01	Sapporo Science Center
398	Nagatoro Observatory	(Japan)	11	Nagatoro
399	Kushiro Observatory	(Japan)	01	Kushiro
400	Kitami Observatory	(Japan)	01	Kitami
401	Oosato Observatory	(Japan)	11	Oosato
402	Dynic Astronomical Observatory	(Japan)	25	Dynic Astronomical Observatory
403	Kani Observatory	(Japan)	21	Kani
404	Yamamoto Observatory	(Japan)	07	Yamamoto
405	Kamihoriguchi Observatory	(Japan)	10	Kamihoriguchi
406	Bibai Observatory	(Japan)	01	Bibai
407	Kahoku Observatory	(Japan)	06	Kahoku
408	Mount Nyukasa Station	(Japan)	20	Nyukasa
409	Kiyose and Mizuho	(Japan)	13	Kiyose and Mizuho
410	Sengamine Observatory	(Japan)	28	Sengamine
411	Oizumi Observatory	(Japan)	10	Oizumi
412	Iwaki Observatory	(Japan)	07	Iwaki
413	Siding Spring Observatory	(Australia)	NSW	Siding Spring Observatory
414	Mount Stromlo Observatory	(Australia)	ACT	Mount Stromlo
415	Kambah Observatory, near Canberra	(Australia)	ACT	Kambah
416	Barton Observatory, near Canberra	(Australia)	ACT	Barton
417	Yanagida Astronomical Observatory	(Japan)	17	Yanagida Astronomical Observatory
418	Tamworth Observatory	(Australia)	NSW	Tamworth
419	Windsor Observatory	(Australia)	NSW	Windsor
420	Sydney Observatory	(Australia)	NSW	Sydney
421	Mt. Kajigamori	(Japan)	39	Mt. Kajigamori, Otoyo
422	Loomberah Observatory	(Australia)	NSW	Loomberah
423	North Ryde Observatory	(Australia)	NSW	North Ryde
424	Macquarie Observatory, near Canberra	(Australia)	ACT	Macquarie
425	Taylor Range Observatory	(Australia)	Qld	Taylor Range Observatory, Brisbane
426	Woomera Observatory	(Australia)	SA	Woomera
427	Stockport Observatory	(Australia)	SA	Stockport
428	Reedy Creek Observatory	(Australia)	Qld	Reedy Creek
429	Hawker Observatory	(Australia)	ACT	Hawker
430	Rainbow Observatory	(Australia)	NSW	Rainbow Observatory, near Coonabarabran
431	Mount Tarana Observatory	(Australia)	NSW	Mt. Tarana Observatory, Bathurst
432	Boambee Observatory	(Australia)	NSW	Boambee
433	Bagnall Beach Observatory	(Australia)	NSW	Bagnall Beach Observatory
434	S. Benedetto Po Observatory	(Italy)	Lo	S. Benedetto Po
435	G. Colombo Astronomical Observatory	(Italy)	V	G. Colombo Astronomical Observatory, Padua
436	Livergnano Observatory (Osservatorio di Livergnano)	(Italy)	ER	Osservatorio di Livergnano
437	Haverford Observatory	(United States)	PA	Haverford
438	Smith College Observatory	(United States)	MA	Smith College Observatory, Northampton
439	ROTSE-III	(United States)	NM	ROTSE-III, Los Alamos
440	Elginfield Observatory	(Canada)	ON	Elginfield Observatory
441	Swilken Brae Observatory	(United Kingdom)	SCT	Swilken Brae, St. Andrews
442	Gualba Observatory	(Spain)	CL	Gualba Observatory
443	Plomer Observatory (Observatorio Astronomico Plomer)	(Argentina)	BA	Obs. Astronomico Plomer, Buenos Aires
444	Star Cruiser Observatory, Anza	(United States)	CA	Star Cruiser Observatory
445	Observatori d'Ontinyent	(Spain)	V	Observatorio d'Ontinyent
446	Kingsnake Observatory	(United States)	TX	Kingsnake Observatory, Seguin
447	Centennial Observatory	(United States)	CO	Centennial Observatory
448	Desert Moon Observatory; observers: Janet and Berton L. Stevens (,)	(United States)	NM	Desert Moon Observatory, Las Cruces
449	Griffin Hunter Observatory	(United States)	SC	Griffin Hunter Observatory, Bethune
450	Carla Jane Observatory	(United States)	NC	Carla Jane Observatory, Charlotte
451	West Skies Observatory	(United States)	KS	West Skies Observatory, Mulvane
452	Big Cypress Observatory	(United States)	FL	Big Cypress Observatory, Fort Lauderdale
453	Edwards Raven Observatory	(United States)	CA	Edwards Raven Observatory
454	Maryland Space Grant Consortium Observatory	(United States)	CA	Maryland Space Grant Consortium Observatory
455	CBA Concord	(United States)	CA	CBA Concord
456	Daventry Observatory	(United Kingdom)	ENG	Daventry Observatory
457	Partizanske Observatory	(Slovakia)	Trenčín	Partizanske
458	Guadarrama Observatory	(Spain)	MD	Guadarrama Observatory
459	Smith River Observatory	(United States)	NH	Smith River Observatory, Danbury
460	Area 52 Observatory	(United States)	AR	Area 52 Observatory, Nashville
461	Piszkéstető Station – of the Konkoly Obs., see #561 and #053;	(Hungary)	-	University of Szeged, Piszkesteto Stn. (Konkoly)
462	Mount Belleview Observatory	(United States)	MD	Mount Belleview Observatory
463	Sommers–Bausch Observatory	(United States)	CO	Sommers-Bausch Observatory, Boulder
464	Toby Point Observatory	(United States)	RI	Toby Point Observatory, Narragansett
465	Takapuna Observatory	(New Zealand)	Au	Takapuna
466	Mount Molehill Observatory	(New Zealand)	Au	Mount Molehill Observatory, Auckland
467	Stardome Observatory (Auckland Observatory)	(New Zealand)	Au	Auckland Observatory
468	Campo Catino Astronomical Observatory (Osservatorio Astronomico Campo Catino)	(Italy)	La	Astronomical Observatory, Campo Catino
469	Courroux Observatory	(Switzerland)	SWF	Courroux
470	Ceccano Observatory (Osservatorio Astronomico Bellatrix)	(Italy)	La	Ceccano
471	Houstrup Observatory	(Denmark)	-	Houstrup
472	Merlette Observatory	(France)	PACA	Merlette
473	Remanzacco Observatory	(Italy)	F	Remanzacco
474	Mount John University Observatory (University of Canterbury Mount John Observatory; UCMJO),	(New Zealand)	Ca	Mount John Observatory, Lake Tekapo
475	Observatory of Turin (before 1913)	(Italy)	P	Turin (before 1913)
476	Grange Observatory	(Italy)	P	Grange Observatory, Bussoleno
477	Galleywood Observatory	(United Kingdom)	ENG	Galleywood
478	Lamalou-les-Bains Observatory	(France)	Occ	Lamalou-les-Bains
479	Sollies-Pont Observatory	(France)	PACA	Sollies-Pont
480	Cockfield Observatory	(United Kingdom)	ENG	Cockfield
481	Moorwarfen Observatory	(Germany) (United Kingdom)	SCT	Moorwarfen
482	St. Andrews Observatory (Observatory of the University of St Andrews)	(United Kingdom)	SCT	St. Andrews
483	Carter Observatory	(New Zealand)	Mrl	Carter Observatory, Black Birch Station
484	Happy Valley Observatory	(New Zealand)	W	Happy Valley, Wellington
485	Carter Observatory	(New Zealand)	W	Carter Observatory, Wellington
486	Palmerston North Observatory	(New Zealand)	MW	Palmerston North
487	Macnairston Observatory	(United Kingdom)	SCT	Macnairston Observatory
488	Newcastle upon Tyne	(United Kingdom)	ENG	Newcastle upon Tyne
489	Hemingford Abbots Observatory	(United Kingdom)	ENG	Hemingford Abbots
490	Wimborne Minster Observatory	(United Kingdom)	ENG	Wimborne Minster
491	Centro Astronómico de Yebes	(Spain)	CM	Centro Astronomico de Yebes
492	Mickleover Observatory	(United Kingdom)	ENG	Mickleover
493	Calar Alto Observatory	(Spain)	AN	Calar Alto
494	Stakenbridge Observatory, near Kidderminster	(United Kingdom)	ENG	Stakenbridge
495	Altrincham Observatory	(United Kingdom)	ENG	Altrincham
496	Bishopstoke Observatory	(United Kingdom)	ENG	Bishopstoke
497	Ascot-Loudwater Observatory	(United Kingdom)	ENG	Ascot-Loudwater
498	Earls Barton Observatory	(United Kingdom)	ENG	Earls Barton
499	Cheam Observatory	(United Kingdom)	ENG	Cheam
500	Geocentric (e.g. IRAS)	SPACE	-	Geocentric
501	Herstmonceux Observatory	(United Kingdom)	ENG	Herstmonceux
502	Colchester Observatory	(United Kingdom)	ENG	Colchester
503	Cambridge Observatory	(United Kingdom)	ENG	Cambridge
504	Le Creusot Observatory	(France)	BFC	Le Creusot
505	Simon Stevin Observatory	(Netherlands)	Noord Brabant	Simon Stevin
506	Bendestorf Observatory	(Germany)	NI	Bendestorf
507	Nyenheim Observatory	(Netherlands)	Gelderland	Nyenheim
508	Zeist Observatory	(Netherlands)	Gelderland	Zeist
509	La Seyne sur Mer Observatory	(France)	PACA	La Seyne sur Mer
510	Siegen Observatory	(Germany)	NRW	Siegen
511	Haute-Provence Observatory (Observatoire de Haute-Provence; OHP)	(France)	PACA	Haute Provence
512	Leiden Observatory (Sterrewacht Leiden; before 1860)	(Netherlands)	Zuid Holland	Leiden (before 1860)
513	Lyons Observatory	(France)	ARA	Lyons
514	Mundenheim Observatory (1907–1913)	(Germany)	RP	Mundenheim (1907-1913)
515	Dhaun Observatory (Volkssternwarte Dhaun)	(Germany)	RP	Volkssternwarte Dhaun, near Kirn
516	Hamburg Observatory (before 1909), German Empire	(Germany)	H	Hamburg (before 1909)
517	Geneva Observatory (Observatory of Geneva) (from 1967)	(Switzerland)	SWF	Geneva (from 1967)
518	Marine Observatory	(Germany)	H	Marine Observatory, Hamburg
519	Meschede Observatory	(Germany)	NRW	Meschede
520	Bonn Observatory	(Germany)	NRW	Bonn
521	Remeis Observatory (Dr. Remeis-Sternwarte)	(Germany)	FB	Remeis Observatory, Bamberg
522	Observatory of Strasbourg (Observatoire de Strasbourg)	(France)	GE	Strasbourg
523	Frankfurt Observatory	(Germany)	HE	Frankfurt
524	Mannheim Observatory	(Germany)	BW	Mannheim
525	Marburg Observatory	(Germany)	HE	Marburg
526	Kiel Observatory	(Germany)	SH	Kiel
527	Altona Observatory (Sternwarte Altona)	(Germany)	H	Altona
528	Göttingen Observatory	(Germany)	NI	Göttingen
529	Christiania Observatory	(Norway)	-	Christiania
530	Lübeck Observatory	(Germany)	SH	Lubeck
531	Collegio Romano Observatory (Osservatorio del Collegio Romano)	(Italy)	La	Collegio Romano, Rome
532	Bogenhausen Observatory (1819–1938) (de:Universitäts-Sternwarte München; Bogenhausener Sternwarte; Sternwarte zu Bogenhausen)	(Germany)	FB	Munich
533	Padua Observatory	(Italy)	V	Padua
534	Leipzig Observatory (since 1861)	(Germany)	SN	Leipzig (since 1861)
535	Palermo Astronomical Observatory (Osservatorio Astronomico di Palermo "Giuseppe S. Vaiana")	(Italy)	Si	Palermo
536	Babelsberg Observatory (Berlin Observatory after 1913)	(Germany)	BB	Berlin-Babelsberg
537	Urania Observatory of Berlin; Berlin Urania Observatory (Urania (Berlin))	(Germany)	B	Urania Observatory, Berlin
538	Austrian Naval Observatory or Pola Observatory; (Sternwarte der kaiserlichen und königlichen Kriegsmarine in Pola; Marine-Sternwarte Pola) located in Pola, now Pula, Croatia	(Croatia)	-	Pola
539	Kremsmünster Observatory	(Austria)	UA	Kremsmunster
540	Davidschlag Observatory (Linz Observatory; Private Observatory Meyer/Obermair; Sternwarte Davidschlag)	(Austria)	UA	Linz
541	Štefánik's Observatory (Prague Observatory)	(Czech Republic)	Prague	Prague
542	Falkensee Observatory	(Germany)	BB	Falkensee
543	Leipzig Observatory (before 1861), German Empire	(Germany) (German Empire)	SN	Leipzig (before 1861)
544	Wilhelm Foerster Observatory (Wilhelm-Foerster-Sternwarte)	(Germany)	B	Schöneberg, Berlin
545	Vienna Observatory (before 1879), Austria-Hungary	(Austria)	Vi	Vienna (before 1879)
546	Oppolzer Observatory	(Austria)	Vi	Oppolzer Observatory, Vienna
547	Breslau Observatory (former German Empire; now: Wrocław University Astronomical Observatory)	(Poland)	LSV	Wrocław, former Breslau
548	Berlin Observatory (1835–1913) (Berliner Sternwarte, Berlin Observatory, before 1913)	(Germany)	B	Berlin (1835-1913)
549	Uppsala Astronomical Observatory (UAO; Astronomiska observatoriet i Uppsala)	(Sweden)	Up	Uppsala
550	Schwerin Observatory	(Germany)	MV	Schwerin
551	Hurbanovo Observatory, formerly O'Gyalla	(Slovakia)	Nitra	Hurbanovo, formerly O'Gyalla
552	San Vittore Observatory (Osservatorio San Vittore)	(Italy)	ER	Osservatorio S. Vittore, Bologna
553	Chorzów Observatory	(Poland)	SV	Chorzow
554	Burgsolms Observatory	(Germany)	NI	Burgsolms Observatory, Wetzlar
555	Cracow-Fort Skała Observatory	(Poland)	LPV	Cracow-Fort Skala
556	Reintal Observatory	(Germany)	FB	Reintal, near Munich
557	Ondřejov Observatory (Observatoř Ondřejov); observers: Marek Wolf, Josef Hanuš	(Czech Republic)	SK	Ondřejov
558	Warsaw Observatory	(Poland)	MV	Warsaw
559	Serra La Nave Observatory	(Italy)	Si	Serra La Nave
560	Madonna di Dossobuono Observatory (Osservatorio Madonna di Dossobuono)	(Italy)	V	Madonna di Dossobuono
561	Piszkéstető Station – of the Konkoly Obs., Budapest,see #461 and #053	(Hungary)	-	Piszkesteto Stn. (Konkoly)
562	Figl Observatory	(Austria)	LA	Figl Observatory, Vienna
563	Seewalchen Observatory	(Austria)	UA	Seewalchen
564	Herrsching Observatory	(Germany)	FB	Herrsching
565	Bassano Bresciano Observatory (Osservatorio Astronomico di Bassano Bresciano)	(Italy)	Lo	Bassano Bresciano
566	Haleakala-NEAT/GEODSS	(United States)	HI	Haleakala-NEAT/GEODSS
567	Chions Observatory (Osservatorio di Chions; Chaonis Observatory)	(Italy)	F	Chions
568	Mauna Kea Observatory	(United States)	HI	Mauna Kea
569	Helsinki Observatory	(Finland)	Uusimaa	Helsinki
570	Vilnius Observatory (since 1939)	(Lithuania)	-	Vilnius (since 1939)
571	Cavriana Observatory (Osservatorio "Giordano Bruno")	(Italy)	Lo	Cavriana
572	Cologne Observatory	(Germany)	NRW	Cologne
573	Eldagsen Observatory	(Germany)	NI	Eldagsen
574	Gottolengo Observatory	(Italy)	Lo	Gottolengo
575	La Chaux de Fonds Observatory	(Switzerland)	SWF	La Chaux de Fonds
576	Burwash Observatory	(United Kingdom)	ENG	Burwash
577	Metzerlen Observatory	(Switzerland)	SWG	Metzerlen Observatory
578	Linden Observatory	(Australia) (South Africa)	Gauteng	Linden Observatory
579	Novi Ligure Observatory	(Italy)	P	Novi Ligure
580	Graz University Observatory	(Austria)	S	Graz
581	Sedgefield Observatory	(South Africa)	WC	Sedgefield
582	Orwell Park Observatory	(United Kingdom)	ENG	Orwell Park
583	Mayaky (observation station)	(Ukraine)	Odesa	Mayaky, Odesa Raion, Odesa Oblast
584	Leningrad Observatory	(Russia)	Saint Petersburg	Leningrad
585	Lisnyky (observation station)	(Ukraine)	Lisnyky. Kyiv region. Ukraine.	Lisnyky (observation station)
586	Pic du Midi Observatory (Observatoire du Pic du Midi)	(France)	Occ	Pic du Midi
587	Sormano Astronomical Observatory (Osservatorio Astronomico Sormano)	(Italy)	Lo	Sormano
588	Eremo di Tizzano Observatory	(Italy)	ER	Eremo di Tizzano
589	Santa Lucia Stroncone Astronomical Observatory (Osservatorio Astrometrico Santa Lucia Stroncone); observers: Antonio Vagnozzi	(Italy)	U	Santa Lucia Stroncone
590	Metzerlen Observatory	(Switzerland)	SWG	Metzerlen
591	Resse Observatory	(Germany)	NI	Resse Observatory
592	Solingen Observatory	(Germany)	NRW	Solingen
593	Monte Argentario Observatory	(Italy)	Tu	Monte Argentario
594	Monte Autore Observatory	(Italy)	La	Monte Autore
595	Farra d'Isonzo Observatory (Astronomical Observatory of Farra d'Isonzo; Osservatorio Astronomico di Farra d'Isonzo)	(Italy)	F	Farra d'Isonzo
596	Colleverde di Guidonia Observatory (Osservatorio Colleverde di Guidonia)	(Italy)	La	Colleverde di Guidonia
597	Springe Observatory	(Germany)	NI	Springe
598	Loiano Observatory (Osservatorio Astronomico di Loiano)	(Italy)	ER	Loiano
599	Campo Imperatore Near-Earth Object Survey (CINEOS)	(Italy)	Ab	Campo Imperatore-CINEOS
600	TLC Observatory	(Italy)	ER	TLC Observatory, Bologna
601	Engelhardt Observatory (Engelhardt-Sternwarte) in Dresden	(Germany)	SN	Engelhardt Observatory, Dresden
602	Urania Observatory (Urania, Vienna)	(Austria)	Vi	Urania Observatory, Vienna
603	Bothkamp Observatory (Sternwarte Bothkamp), near Kiel	(Germany)	SH	Bothkamp
604	Archenhold Observatory (Archenhold Sternwarte)	(Germany)	B	Archenhold Sternwarte, Berlin-Treptow
605	Marl Observatory	(Germany)	NRW	Marl
606	Norderstedt Observatory	(Germany)	SH	Norderstedt
607	Hagen Observatory; not to be confused with: #B86	(Germany)	NRW	Hagen Observatory, Ronkhausen
608	Air Force Maui Optical and Supercomputing observatory (AMOS) Haleakala-AMOS	(United States)	HI	Haleakala-AMOS
609	Polino Observatory (Osservatorio Polino)	(Italy)	U	Osservatorio Polino
610	Pianoro Observatory	(Italy)	ER	Pianoro
611	Starkenburg Observatory (Heppenheim Observatory; Starkenburg-Sternwarte)	(Germany)	NI	Starkenburg Sternwarte, Heppenheim
612	Lenkerbeck Observatory	(Germany)	NRW	Lenkerbeck
613	Heisingen Observatory	(Germany)	NRW	Heisingen
614	Soisy-sur-Seine Observatory	(France)	IDF	Soisy-sur-Seine
615	Observatory of Saint-Veran	(France)	PACA	St. Veran
616	Brno Observatory	(Czech Republic)	South Moravia	Brno
617	Arbonne-la-Forêt Observatory	(France)	IDF	Arbonne la Foret
618	Martigues Observatory	(France)	PACA	Martigues
619	Sabadell Observatory	(Spain)	CT	Sabadell
620	Astronomical Observatory of Mallorca (Observatorio Astronómico de Mallorca); observer: Reiner Stoss, Salvador Sánchez, Jaume Nomen	(Spain)	IB	Observatorio Astronomico de Mallorca
621	Bergisch Gladbach Observatory	(Germany)	NRW	Bergisch Gladbach
622	Oberwichtrach Observatory	(Switzerland)	SWG	Oberwichtrach
623	Liège Observatory	(Belgium)	WAL	Liege
624	Dertingen Observatory	(Germany)	BW	Dertingen
625	Air Force Maui Optical and Supercomputing observatory (AMOS) Kihei	(United States)	HI	Kihei-AMOS Remote Maui Experimental Site
626	Geel Observatory	(Belgium)	VLG	Geel
627	Blauvac Observatory (Observatoire de Blauvac) observer: René Roy	(France)	PACA	Blauvac
628	Turtle Star Observatory	(Germany)	NRW	Mulheim-Ruhr
629	Szeged Observatory, JATE Observatory	(Hungary)	-	Szeged Observatory
630	Osenbach Observatory	(France)	GE	Osenbach
631	Hamburg-Georgswerder	(Germany)	H	Hamburg-Georgswerder
632	San Paolo a Mosciano Observatory	(Italy)	Tu	San Polo A Mosciano
633	Romito Observatory	(Italy)	Lo	Romito
634	Crolles Observatory	(France)	ARA	Crolles
635	Pergignan Observatory	(France)	Occ	Pergignan
636	Walter Hohmann Observatory (Essen Observatory)	(Germany)	NRW	Essen
637	Hamburg-Himmelsmoor Observatory	(Germany)	H	Hamburg-Himmelsmoor
638	Detmold Observatory	(Germany)	NRW	Detmold
639	Dresden Observatory	(Germany)	SN	Dresden
640	Senftenberger Observatory (Senftenberger Sternwarte)	(Czech Republic)	SK	Senftenberger Sternwarte
641	Overberg Observatory	(South Africa)	WC	Overberg
642	Oak Bay	(Canada)	BC	Oak Bay, Victoria
643	OCA-Anza Observatory (Orange County Astronomers – Anza)	(United States)	CA	OCA-Anza Observatory
644	Near-Earth Asteroid Tracking (NEAT) at (Palomar Observatory)	(United States)	CA	Palomar Mountain/NEAT
645	Sloan Digital Sky Survey (SDSS), Sunspot, at (Apache Point Observatory)	(United States)	NM	Apache Point-Sloan Digital Sky Survey
646	Santana Observatory: observer: Robert Stephens (see #G79, #U81)	(United States)	CA	Santana Observatory, Rancho Cucamonga
647	Stone Finder Observatory	(Canada)	AB	Stone Finder Observatory, Calgary
648	Winer Observatory	(United States)	AZ	Winer Observatory, Sonoita
649	Powell Observatory	(United States)	KS	Powell Observatory, Louisburg
650	Temecula Observatory	(United States)	CA	Temecula
651	Grasslands Observatory	(United States)	AZ	Grasslands Observatory, Tucson
652	Rock Finder Observatory	(Canada)	AB	Rock Finder Observatory, Calgary
653	Torus Observatory	(United States)	WA	Torus Observatory, Buckley
654	Table Mountain Observatory, Wrightwood-PHMC	(United States)	CA	Table Mountain Observatory, Wrightwood-PHMC
655	Sooke Observatory	(Canada)	BC	Sooke
656	Victoria Observatory	(Canada)	BC	Victoria
657	Climenhaga Observatory	(Canada)	BC	Climenhaga Observatory, Victoria
658	National Research Council of Canada (Dominion Astrophysical Observatory, Saanich)	(Canada)	BC	National Research Council of Canada
659	Heron Cove Observatory, Orcas	(United States)	WA	Heron Cove Observatory, Orcas
660	Leuschner Observatory, Berkeley	(United States)	CA	Leuschner Observatory, Berkeley
661	Rothney Astrophysical Observatory, Priddis	(Canada)	AB	Rothney Astrophysical Observatory, Priddis
662	Lick Observatory, Mount Hamilton	(United States)	CA	Lick Observatory, Mount Hamilton
663	Red Mountain Observatory, Ivins	(United States)	UT	Red Mountain Observatory
664	Manastash Ridge Observatory, Ellensburg	(United States)	WA	Manastash Ridge Observatory
665	Wallis Observatory	(United States)	CA	Wallis Observatory
666	Moorpark College Observatory, Ventura County	(United States)	CA	Moorpark College Observatory
667	Wanapum Dam Observatory	(United States)	WA	Wanapum Dam
668	San Emigdio Peak	(United States)	CA	San Emigdio Peak
669	Ojai Observatory	(United States)	CA	Ojai
670	Camarillo Observatory	(United States)	CA	Camarillo
671	Stony Ridge Observatory	(United States)	CA	Stony Ridge
672	Mount Wilson Observatory	(United States)	CA	Mount Wilson
673	Table Mountain Observatory	(United States)	CA	Table Mountain Observatory, Wrightwood
674	Ford Observatory	(United States)	CA	Ford Observatory, Wrightwood
675	Palomar Observatory	(United States)	CA	Palomar Mountain
676	San Clemente Observatory	(United States)	CA	San Clemente
677	Lake Arrowhead	(United States)	CA	Lake Arrowhead
678	Fountain Hills Observatory	(United States)	AZ	Fountain Hills
679	National Astronomical Observatory (Mexico)	(Mexico)	Baja California	San Pedro Martir
680	Los Angeles Observatory	(United States)	CA	Los Angeles
681	Calgary Observatory (Centre for Backyard Astrophysics)	(Canada)	AB	Calgary
682	Crescent Butte Observatory; observer Edwin E. Sheridan	(United States)	UT	Kanab
683	Goodricke-Pigott Observatory, Tucson	(United States)	AZ	Goodricke-Pigott Observatory, Tucson
684	Prescott Observatory	(United States)	AZ	Prescott
685	Williams Observatory	(United States)	AZ	Williams
686	U. of Minn. Infrared Obs., Mt. Lemmon (UMN Mount Lemmon Observing Facility)	(United States)	AZ	U. of Minn. Infrared Obs., Mt. Lemmon
687	Northern Arizona University	(United States)	AZ	Northern Arizona University, Flagstaff
688	Lowell Observatory, Anderson Mesa Station	(United States)	AZ	Lowell Observatory, Anderson Mesa Station
689	United States Naval Observatory Flagstaff Station (NOFS)	(United States)	AZ	U.S. Naval Observatory, Flagstaff
690	Lowell Observatory; observer: Brian Skiff	(United States)	AZ	Lowell Observatory, Flagstaff
691	Spacewatch at Kitt Peak, Steward Observatory	(United States)	AZ	Steward Observatory, Kitt Peak-Spacewatch
692	Steward Observatory	(United States)	AZ	Steward Observatory, Tucson
693	Catalina Station	(United States)	AZ	Catalina Station, Tucson
694	Tumamoc Hill at Steward Observatory	(United States)	AZ	Tumamoc Hill, Tucson
695	Kitt Peak National Observatory	(United States)	AZ	Kitt Peak
696	Fred Lawrence Whipple Observatory	(United States)	AZ	Whipple Observatory, Mt. Hopkins
697	MDM Observatory at Kitt Peak, McGraw-Hill	(United States)	AZ	Kitt Peak, McGraw-Hill
698	Mt. Bigelow	(United States)	AZ	Mt. Bigelow
699	Lowell Observatory Near-Earth-Object Search (LONEOS) at Anderson Mesa Station, Lowell Observatory	(United States)	AZ	Lowell Observatory-LONEOS
700	Chinle Observatory	(United States)	AZ	Chinle
701	Junk Bond Observatory, Sierra Vista	(United States)	AZ	Junk Bond Observatory, Sierra Vista
702	Joint Observatory for cometary research (now the site of Magdalena Ridge Observatory)	(United States)	NM	Joint Obs. for cometary research, Socorro
703	Catalina Sky Survey, Tucson	(United States)	AZ	Catalina Sky Survey
704	Lincoln Laboratory ETS (Lincoln Laboratory's Experimental Test Site), Socorro, (also see LINEAR)	(United States)	NM	Lincoln Laboratory ETS, New Mexico
705	Apache Point, Sunspot (Apache Point Observatory)	(United States)	NM	Apache Point
706	Salida Observatory	(United States)	CO	Salida
707	Chamberlin field station	(United States)	CO	Chamberlin field station
708	Chamberlin Observatory, Denver	(United States)	CO	Chamberlin Observatory, Denver
709	W & B Observatory, Warren & Beverly" Offutt Observatory	(United States)	NM	W & B Observatory, Cloudcroft
710	MPO Observatory	(United States)	CO	MPO Observatory, Florissant
711	McDonald Observatory	(United States)	TX	McDonald Observatory, Fort Davis
712	USAF Academy Observatory	(United States)	CO	USAF Academy Observatory, Colorado Springs
713	Thornton Observatory; observer: Robert A. Koff (also see #H09)	(United States)	CO	Thornton
714	Bagdad Observatory	(United States)	AZ	Bagdad
715	Jornada Observatory	(United States)	NM	Jornada Observatory, Las Cruces
716	Palmer Divide Observatory; observer: Brian D. Warner	(United States)	CO	Palmer Divide Observatory, Colorado Springs
717	Prude Ranch Observatory	(United States)	TX	Prude Ranch
718	University of Utah, Tooele	(United States)	UT	Tooele
719	Etscorn Observatory (Frank T. Etscorn Campus Observatory, Socorro New Mexico Tech Astronomy Club	(United States)	NM	Etscorn Observatory
720	Universidad de Monterrey Observatory, Nuevo León	(Mexico)	-	Universidad de Monterrey
721	Lime Creek Observatory	(United States)	NE	Lime Creek
722	Missouri City Observatory	(United States)	TX	Missouri City
723	Cottonwood Observatory	(United States)	OK	Cottonwood Observatory, Ada
724	National Observatory (Observatorio Astronómico Nacional; Observatorio de Tacubaya)	(Mexico)	-	National Observatory, Tacubaya
725	Fair Oaks Ranch Observatory	(United States)	TX	Fair Oaks Ranch
726	Fire in the Sky Observatory	(United States)	MN	Brainerd
727	Zeno Observatory	(United States)	OK	Zeno Observatory, Edmond
728	Corpus Christi	(United States)	TX	Corpus Christi
729	Glenlea Astronomical Observatory	(Canada)	MB	Glenlea Astronomical Observatory, Winnipeg
730	University of North Dakota, Grand Forks	(United States)	ND	University of North Dakota, Grand Forks
731	Rose-Hulman Observatory	(United States)	IN	Rose-Hulman Observatory, Terre Haute
732	Oaxaca Observatory	(Mexico)	-	Oaxaca
733	Allen Observatory	(United States)	TX	Allen, Texas
734	Farpoint Observatory	(United States)	KS	Farpoint Observatory, Eskridge
735	George Observatory (Needville Observatory)	(United States)	TX	George Observatory, Needville
736	Houston Observatory	(United States)	TX	Houston
737	New Bullpen Observatory	(United States)	GA	New Bullpen Observatory, Alpharetta
738	Observatory of the State University of Missouri	(United States)	MO	Observatory of the State University of Missouri
739	Sunflower Observatory	(United States)	KS	Sunflower Observatory, Olathe
740	SFA Observatory	(United States)	TX	SFA Observatory, Nacogdoches
741	Goodsell Observatory	(United States)	MN	Goodsell Observatory, Northfield
742	Drake University	(United States)	IA	Drake University, Des Moines
743	University of Minnesota	(United States)	MN	University of Minnesota, Minneapolis
744	Doyan Rose Observatory	(United States)	IN	Doyan Rose Observatory, Indianapolis
745	Glasgow Observatory	(United States)	MO	Morrison Observatory, Glasgow
746	Brooks Astronomical Observatory	(United States)	MI	Brooks Observatory, Mt. Pleasant
747	Highland Road Park Observatory (a.k.a. Baton Rouge Observatory)	(United States)	LA	Highland Road Park Observatory
748	Van Allen Observatory	(United States)	IA	Van Allen Observatory, Iowa City
749	Oakwood Observatory	(United States)	GA	Oakwood
750	Hobbs Observatory	(United States)	WI	Hobbs Observatory, Fall Creek
751	Lake Saint Louis Observatory	(United States)	MO	Lake Saint Louis
752	Puckett Observatory	(United States)	GA	Puckett Observatory, Mountain Town
753	Washburn Observatory	(United States)	WI	Washburn Observatory, Madison
754	Yerkes Observatory	(United States)	WI	Yerkes Observatory, Williams Bay
755	Optec Observatory	(United States)	MI	Optec Observatory
756	Dearborn Observatory	(United States)	IL	Dearborn Observatory, Evanston
757	High Point Observatory	(United States)	NC	High Point
758	Astronaut Memorial Planetarium & Observatory (BCC Observatory; Brevard Community College Observatory)	(United States)	FL	BCC Observatory, Cocoa
759	Nashville Observatory (Vanderbilt's Dyer Observatory)	(United States)	TN	Nashville
760	Goethe Link Observatory	(United States)	IN	Goethe Link Observatory, Brooklyn
761	Quail Hollow Observatory	(United States)	FL	Zephyrhills
762	Four Winds Observatory	(United States)	MI	Four Winds Observatory, Lake Leelanau
763	King City Observatory	(Canada)	ON	King City
764	Puckett Observatory	(United States)	GA	Puckett Observatory, Stone Mountain
765	Cincinnati Observatory	(United States)	OH	Cincinnati
766	Michigan State University Observatory	(United States)	MI	Michigan State University Obs., East Lansing
767	Angell Hall Observatory	(United States)	MI	Ann Arbor
768	UM-Dearborn Observatory	(United States)	MI	Dearborn Observatory
769	McMillin Observatory	(United States)	OH	McMillin Observatory, Columbus
770	Crescent Moon Observatory	(United States)	OH	Crescent Moon Observatory, Columbus
771	Boyeros Observatory (Observatorio de Rancho Boyeros)	(Cuba)	-	Boyeros Observatory, Havana
772	Boltwood Observatory	(Canada)	ON	Boltwood Observatory, Stittsville
773	Warner and Swasey Observatory – Cleveland	(United States)	OH	Warner and Swasey Observatory, Cleveland
774	Warner and Swasey Nassau Station – Chardon	(United States)	OH	Warner and Swasey Nassau Station, Chardon
775	Sayre Observatory	(United States)	PA	Sayre Observatory, South Bethlehem
776	Foggy Bottom Observatory	(United States)	NY	Foggy Bottom, Hamilton
777	Toronto Observatory	(Canada)	ON	Toronto
778	Allegheny Observatory	(United States)	PA	Allegheny Observatory, Pittsburgh
779	David Dunlap Observatory	(Canada)	ON	David Dunlap Observatory, Richmond Hill
780	Leander McCormick Observatory	(United States)	VA	Leander McCormick Observatory, Charlottesville
781	Quito Observatory	(Ecuador)	-	Quito
782	Quito, comet astrograph station	(Ecuador)	-	Quito, comet astrograph station
783	Rixeyville Observatory	(United States)	VA	Rixeyville
784	Stull Observatory	(United States)	NY	Stull Observatory, Alfred University
785	Fitz-Randolph Observatory	(United States)	NJ	Fitz-Randolph Observatory, Princeton
786	United States Naval Observatory (USNO; since 1893)	(United States)	D.C.	U.S. Naval Obs., Washington (since 1893)
787	United States Naval Observatory (USNO; before 1893)	(United States)	D.C.	U.S. Naval Obs., Washington (before 1893)
788	Mount Cuba Observatory	(United States)	DE	Mount Cuba Observatory, Wilmington
789	Litchfield Observatory (Hamilton College), Oneida County; not to be confused with #845	(United States)	NY	Litchfield Observatory, Clinton
790	Dominion Observatory	(Canada)	ON	Dominion Observatory, Ottawa
791	Flower and Cook Observatory	(United States)	PA	Flower and Cook Observatory, Philadelphia
792	University of Rhode Island	(United States)	RI	University of Rhode Island, Quonochontaug
793	Dudley Observatory (before 1893)	(United States)	NY	Dudley Observatory, Albany (before 1893)
794	Vassar College Observatory	(United States)	NY	Vassar College Observatory, Poughkeepsie
795	Rutherford Observatory	(United States)	NY	Rutherford
796	Stamford Observatory	(United States)	CT	Stamford
797	Yale University Observatory – New Haven	(United States)	CT	Yale Observatory, New Haven
798	Yale University Observatory – Bethany	(United States)	CT	Yale Observatory, Bethany
799	Winchester Observatory	(United States)	MA	Winchester
800	Boyden Station of the Harvard Observatory	(Peru)	-	Harvard Observatory, Arequipa
801	Oak Ridge Observatory (George R. Agassiz Station)	(United States)	MA	Oak Ridge Observatory
802	Harvard College Observatory	(United States)	MA	Harvard Observatory, Cambridge
803	Taunton Observatory	(United States)	MA	Taunton
804	Santiago-San Bernardo Observatory	(Chile)	-	Santiago-San Bernardo
805	Cerro El Roble Station (of Chile's National Astronomical Observatory, see #806), Santiago	(Chile)	-	Santiago-Cerro El Roble
806	National Astronomical Observatory (Chile)	(Chile)	-	Santiago-Cerro Calán
807	Cerro Tololo Inter-American Observatory	(Chile)	Co	Cerro Tololo Observatory, La Serena
808	Félix Aguilar Observatory ,Carlos U. Cesco Station; (El Leoncito)	(Argentina)	J	Estación de Altura Carlos Cesco
809	La Silla Observatory of the European Southern Observatory (ESO)	(Chile)	Co	European Southern Observatory, La Silla
810	George R. Wallace Jr. Astrophysical Observatory (WAO)	(United States)	MA	Wallace Observatory, Westford
811	Maria Mitchell Observatory	(United States)	MA	Maria Mitchell Observatory, Nantucket
812	Viña del Mar Observatory	(Chile)	-	Vina del Mar
813	Santiago-Quinta Normal (1862–1920) (see #806, National Astronomical Observatory)	(Chile)	-	Santiago-Quinta Normal (1862-1920)
814	North Scituate Observatory	(United States)	RI	North Scituate
815	Santiago-Santa Lucia (1849–1861) (see #806, National Astronomical Observatory)	(Chile)	-	Santiago-Santa Lucia (1849-1861)
816	Rand Observatory	(United States)	NY	Rand Observatory
817	Sudbury Observatory	(United States)	MA	Sudbury
818	Gémeaux Observatory (Observatoire Gémeaux)	(Canada)	QC	Gemeaux Observatory, Laval
819	Val-des-Bois Observatory	(Canada)	QC	Val-des-Bois
820	Tarija Observatory	(Bolivia)	-	Tarija
821	Bosque Alegre Station (Estación Astrofísica de Bosque Alegre) of the Córdoba Observatory, see #822	(Argentina)	Cór	Cordoba-Bosque Alegre
822	Argentine National Observatory (Córdoba Observatory; Astronomical Observatory of Córdoba; Observatorio Astronómico de Córdoba)	(Argentina)	Cór	Cordoba
823	Scott Observatory (Fitchburg Observatory)	(United States)	MA	Fitchburg
824	Lake Clear Observatory	(United States)	NY	Lake Clear
825	Granville Observatory	(United States)	MA	Granville
826	Plessisville Observatory, Plessisville	(Canada)	QC	Plessissville
827	Saint-Félicien Observatory	(Canada)	QC	Saint-Felicien
828	Assonet Observatory	(United States)	MA	Assonet
829	Leoncito Astronomical Complex (Complejo Astronómico El Leoncito)	(Argentina)	J	Complejo Astronomico El Leoncito
830	Hudson Observatory	(United States)	NH	Hudson
831	Rosemary Hill Observatory	(United States)	FL	Rosemary Hill Observatory, University of Florida
832	Etters Observatory	(United States)	PA	Etters
833	Mercedes Observatory (Observatorio Astronomico de Mercedes)	(Argentina)	BA	Obs. Astronomico de Mercedes, Buenos Aires
834	Argentinian Association of Amateur Astronomers (Asociación Argentina Amigos de la Astronomía; A.A.A.A., asaramas)	(Argentina)	BA	Buenos Aires-AAAA
835	Drum Hill Station	(United States)	MA	Drum Hill Station, Chelmsford
836	Furnace Brook Observatory	(United States)	RI	Furnace Brook Observatory, Cranston
837	Jupiter Observatory; Boca Raton Observatory at Boca Raton; observer: B. A. Segal	(United States)	FL	Jupiter
838	Dayton Observatory	(United States)	OH	Dayton
839	La Plata Astronomical Observatory (Observatorio Astronómico de La Plata)	(Argentina)	LP	La Plata
840	Flint Observatory	(United States)	MI	Flint
841	Martin Observatory	(United States)	VA	Martin Observatory, Blacksburg
842	Gettysburg College Observatory	(United States)	PA	Gettysburg College Observatory
843	Emerald Lane Observatory	(United States)	AL	Emerald Lane Observatory, Decatur
844	Los Molinos Observatory (Observatorio Astronómico Los Molinos)	(Uruguay)	-	Observatorio Astronomico Los Molinos
845	Clinton B. Ford Observatory; not to be confused with #789	(United States)	NY	Ford Observatory, Ithaca
846	Principia Astronomical Observatory	(United States)	IL	Principia Astronomical Observatory, Elsah
847	Lunar Cafe Observatory	(United States)	MI	Lunar Cafe Observator, Flint
848	Tenagra Observatory	(United States)	OR	Tenagra Observatory, Cottage Grove
849	Everstar Observatory (EverStaR Observatory)	(United States)	KS	Everstar Observatory, Olathe
850	Cordell-Lorenz Observatory	(United States)	TN	Cordell-Lorenz Observatory, Sewanee
851	Burke-Gaffney Observatory	(Canada)	NS	Burke-Gaffney Observatory, Halifax
852	River Moss Observatory	(United States)	MO	River Moss Observatory, St. Peters
853	Biosphere 2 Observatory	(United States)	AZ	Biosphere 2 Observatory
854	Sabino Canyon Observatory	(United States)	AZ	Sabino Canyon Observatory, Tucson
855	Wayside Observatory	(United States)	MN	Wayside Observatory, Minnetonka
856	Roach Motel Observatory	(United States)	CA	Riverside
857	Iowa Robotic Observatory	(United States)	AZ	Iowa Robotic Observatory, Sonoita
858	Tebbutt Observatory	(United States)	NM	Tebbutt Observatory, Edgewood
859	Wykrota Observatory (Observatório Wykrota) at CEAMIG (Centro de Estudos Astronômicos de Minas Gerais)	(Brazil)	MG	Wykrota Observatory-CEAMIG
860	Valinhos Observatory	(Brazil)	SP	Valinhos
861	Barão Geraldo Observatory	(Brazil)	SP	Barao Geraldo
862	Saku Observatory	(Japan)	-	Saku
863	Furukawa Observatory	(Japan)	-	Furukawa
864	Kumamoto Civil Astronomical Observatory (KCAO)	(Japan)	-	Kumamoto
865	Emmy Observatory	(United States)	NY	Emmy Observatory, New Paltz
866	United States Naval Academy	(United States)	MD	U.S. Naval Academy, Michelson
867	Saji Observatory	(Japan)	-	Saji Observatory
868	Hidaka Observatory	(Japan)	-	Hidaka Observatory
869	Tosa Observatory	(Japan)	-	Tosa
870	Campinas Observatory (Observatório de Campinas; Observatório Municipal de Campinas "Jean Nicolini")	(Brazil)	SP	Campinas
871	Akou Observatory	(Japan)	-	Akou
872	Tokushima-Kainan Astronomical Observatory	(Japan)	36	Tokushima
873	Kurashiki Observatory, Okayama Astrophysical Observatory	(Japan)	33	Kurashiki Observatory
874	Pico dos Dias Observatory (Observatório Pico dos Dias)	(Brazil)	MG	Observatorio do Pico dos Dias, Itajubá
875	Yorii Observatory	(Japan)	-	Yorii
876	Honjo Observatory	(Japan)	-	Honjo
877	Okutama Observatory	(Japan)	-	Okutama
878	Kagiya Observatory	(Japan)	-	Kagiya
879	Tōkai Observatory	(Japan)	23	Tokai
880	National Observatory (Brazil) (Rio de Janeiro Observatory; Observatório Nacional; ON)	(Brazil)	RJ	Rio de Janeiro
881	Toyota Observatory	(Japan)	23	Toyota
882	JCPM Oi Station	(Japan)	-	JCPM Oi Station
883	Shizuoka Observatory	(Japan)	22	Shizuoka
884	Kawane Observatory	(Japan)	-	Kawane
885	JCPM Yakiimo Station	(Japan)	22	JCPM Yakiimo Station
886	Mishima Observatory (at Susono, Shizuoka and Mishima, Shizuoka)	(Japan)	22	Mishima
887	Ojima Observatory	(Japan)	10	Ojima
888	Gekko Observatory	(Japan)	22	Gekko
889	Karasuyama Observatory	(Japan)	-	Karasuyama
890	JCPM Tone Station	(Japan)	-	JCPM Tone Station
891	JCPM Kimachi Station	(Japan)	-	JCPM Kimachi Station
892	YGCO Hoshikawa and Nagano Stations	(Japan)	20	YGCO Hoshikawa and Nagano Stations
893	Sendai Astronomical Observatory (Sendai Municipal Observatory)	(Japan)	-	Sendai Municipal Observatory
894	Kiyosato Observatory	(Japan)	-	Kiyosato
895	Hatamae Observatory	(Japan)	-	Hatamae
896	Yatsugatake South Base Observatory (near #386 Yatsugatake-Kobuchizawa)	(Japan)	13	Yatsugatake South Base Observatory
897	YGCO Chiyoda Station (YGCO: Yamaneko Group of Comet Observers)	(Japan)	-	YGCO Chiyoda Station
898	Fujieda Observatory	(Japan)	22	Fujieda
899	Toma Observatory	(Japan)	-	Toma
900	Moriyama Observatory	(Japan)	25	Moriyama
901	Tajimi Observatory	(Japan)	21	Tajimi
902	Ootake Observatory	(Japan)	-	Ootake
903	Fukuchiyama and Kannabe Observatory	(Japan)	-	Fukuchiyama and Kannabe
904	Go-Chome and Kobe-Suma Observatory	(Japan)	-	Go-Chome and Kobe-Suma
905	Nachi-Katsuura Observatory	(Japan)	30	Nachi-Katsuura Observatory
906	Cobram Observatory	(Australia)	Vic	Cobram
907	Melbourne Observatory	(Australia)	Vic	Melbourne
908	Toyama Observatory	(Japan)	-	Toyama
909	Snohomish Hilltop Observatory	(United States)	WA	Snohomish Hilltop Observatory
910	OCA–DLR Asteroid Survey (ODAS) at Caussols	(France)	-	Caussols-ODAS
911	Collins Observatory (Eileen M. Collins Observatory), Elmira-Corning Astronomical Society ("Elmira"), Corning	(United States)	NY	Collins Observatory, Corning Community College
912	Carbuncle Hill Observatory; observer: Donald Pray (also see #I00)	(United States)	RI	Carbuncle Hill Observatory, Greene
913	Kappa Crucis Observatory (Observatorio Kappa Crucis)	(Uruguay)	-	Observatorio Kappa Crucis, Montevideo
914	Underwood Observatory	(United States)	MA	Underwood Observatory, Hubbardston
915	River Oaks Observatory	(United States)	TX	River Oaks Observatory, New Braunfels
916	Oakley Observatory	(United States)	IN	Oakley Observatory, Terre Haute
917	Pacific Lutheran University Keck Observatory	(United States)	WA	Pacific Lutheran University Keck Observatory
918	Badlands Observatory	(United States)	SD	Badlands Observatory, Quinn
919	Desert Beaver Observatory	(United States)	AZ	Desert Beaver Observatory
920	RIT Observatory (Rochester Institute of Technology)	(United States)	NY	RIT Observatory, Rochester
921	SW Institute for Space Research	(United States)	NM	SW Institute for Space Research, Cloudcroft
922	Timberland Observatory	(United States)	AL	Timberland Observatory, Decatur
923	Bradstreet Observatory	(United States)	PA	The Bradstreet Observatory, St. Davids
924	Cégep de Trois-Rivières Observatory (Observatoire du Cégep de Trois-Rivières)	(Canada)	-	Observatoire du Cegep de Trois-Rivieres
925	Palominas Observatory	(United States)	AZ	Palominas Observatory
926	Tenagra II Observatory	(United States)	AZ	Tenagra II Observatory, Nogales
927	Madison-YRS	(United States)	WI	Madison-YRS
928	Moonedge Observatory	(United States)	NY	Moonedge Observatory, Northport
929	Blackberry Observatory	(United States)	LA	Port Allen
930	Southern Stars Observatory	(French Polynesia)	-	Southern Stars Observatory, Tahiti
931	Punaauia Observatory, Puna'auia	(French Polynesia)	-	Punaauia
932	John J. McCarthy Observatory	(United States)	CT	John J. McCarthy Obs., New Milford
933	Rockland Observatory	(United States)	AZ	Rockland Observatory, Sierra Vista
934	Poway Valley Observatory	(United States)	CA	Poway Valley
935	Wyrick Observatory	(United States)	VA	Wyrick Observatory, Haymarket
936	Ibis Observatory	(United States)	KS	Ibis Observatory, Manhattan
937	Bradbury Observatory	(United Kingdom)	ENG	Bradbury Observatory, Stockton-on-Tees
938	Linhaceira Observatory; observer: Rui Goncalves	(Portugal)	-	Linhaceira
939	Rodeno Observatory (Observatorio Rodeno)	(Spain)	-	Observatorio Rodeno
940	Waterlooville Observatory	(United Kingdom)	ENG	Waterlooville
941	Pla D'Arguines Observatory (Observatorio Astronomico Pla D'Arguines)	(Spain)	-	Observatorio Pla D'Arguines
942	Grantham Observatory	(United Kingdom)	ENG	Grantham
943	Peverell Observatory	(United Kingdom)	ENG	Peverell, Plymouth
944	Geminis Observatory (Observatorio Geminis, also see #I30 in Argentina)	(Spain)	-	Observatorio Geminis, Dos Hermanas
945	Monte Deva Observatory (Observatorio Monte Deva)	(Spain)	-	Observatorio Monte Deva
946	Ametlla de Mar Observatory	(Spain)	CT	Ametlla de Mar
947	Saint-Sulpice Observatory (Observatoire de Saint-Sulpice)	(France)	-	Saint-Sulpice
948	Pymoor Observatory	(United Kingdom)	ENG	Pymoor
949	Durtal Observatory	(France)	-	Durtal
950	Roque de los Muchachos Observatory (La Palma Observatory)	(Spain)	CN	La Palma
951	Highworth Observatory	(United Kingdom)	ENG	Highworth
952	Marxuquera Observatory (Observatori Astronòmic Marxuquera)	(Spain)	-	Marxuquera
953	Montjoia Observatory	(Spain)	-	Montjoia
954	Teide Observatory, Tenerife	(Spain)	CN	Teide Observatory
955	Sassoeiros Observatory	(Portugal)	-	Sassoeiros
956	Pozuelo Observatory (Observatorio Pozuelo)	(Spain)	-	Observatorio Pozuelo
957	Merignac Observatory	(France)	-	Merignac
958	Dax Observatory (Observatoire de Dax)	(France)	-	Observatoire de Dax
959	Ramonville Saint Agne Observatory	(France)	-	Ramonville Saint Agne
960	Rolvenden Observatory	(United Kingdom)	ENG	Rolvenden
961	City Observatory (Calton Hill Observatory)	(United Kingdom) (Scotland)	Edinburgh	City Observatory, Calton Hill, Edinburgh
962	Gandia Observatory	(Spain)	-	Gandia
963	Werrington Observatory	(United Kingdom)	-	Werrington
964	Southend Bradfield Observatory	(United Kingdom)	ENG	Southend Bradfield
965	Algarve Observatory (Portimão Observatory; Observação Astronómica no Algarve; Centro de Observação Astronómica no Algarve; COAA)	(Portugal)	-	Observacao Astronomica no Algarve, Portimao
966	Church Stretton Observatory	(United Kingdom)	ENG	Church Stretton
967	Greens Norton Observatory	(United Kingdom)	Northamptonshire	Greens Norton
968	Haverhill Observatory	(United Kingdom)	Suffolk	Haverhill
969	George Bishop's Observatory (1836–1861)	(United Kingdom)	London	London-Regents Park
970	Chelmsford Observatory	(United Kingdom)	Essex	Chelmsford
971	Lisbon Observatory	(Portugal)	-	Lisbon
972	Dun Echt Observatory	(United Kingdom)	SCT	Dun Echt
973	Harrow Observatory	(United Kingdom)	Greater London	Harrow
974	Genoa Observatory	(Italy)	-	Genoa
975	Astronomical Observatory of the University of Valencia	(Spain)	V	Observatorio Astronomico de Valencia
976	Leamington Spa Observatory	(United Kingdom)	-	Leamington Spa
977	Markree Observatory, County Sligo	(Republic of Ireland)	-	Markree
978	Conder Brow Observatory	(United Kingdom)	Lancashire	Conder Brow
979	South Wonston Observatory	(United Kingdom)	-	South Wonston
980	Lancaster Observatory	(United Kingdom)	-	Lancaster
981	Armagh Observatory	(United Kingdom)	NIR	Armagh
982	Dunsink Observatory	(Republic of Ireland)	-	Dunsink Observatory, Dublin
983	Real Instituto y Observatorio de la Armada	(Spain)	-	San Fernando
984	Eastfield Observatory	(United Kingdom)	-	Eastfield
985	Telford Observatory	(United Kingdom)	-	Telford
986	Ascot Observatory	(United Kingdom)	ENG	Ascot
987	The Isle of Man Observatory (The Isle of Man Astronomical Society)	(United Kingdom)	-	Isle of Man Observatory, Foxdale
988	Glasgow Observatory	(United Kingdom) (Scotland)	SCT	Glasgow
989	Wilfred Hall Observatory	(United Kingdom)	ENG	Wilfred Hall Observatory, Preston
990	Royal Observatory of Madrid–Spanish National Observatory (Madrid Observatory; Observatorio Astronómico de Madrid)	(Spain)	MD	Madrid
991	Liverpool Observatory (since 1867)	(United Kingdom)	ENG	Liverpool (since 1867)
992	Liverpool Observatory (before 1867)	(United Kingdom)	ENG	Liverpool (before 1867)
993	Woolston Observatory	(United Kingdom)	-	Woolston Observatory
994	Godalming Observatory	(United Kingdom)	-	Godalming
995	Durham University Observatory	(United Kingdom)	-	Durham
996	Radcliffe Observatory (moved to South Africa in 1939)	(United Kingdom) (South Africa)	-	Oxford
997	Hartwell Observatory	(United Kingdom)	ENG	Hartwell
998	UCL Observatory (University of London Observatory; London-Mill Hill Observatory)	(United Kingdom)	-	London-Mill Hill
999	Bordeaux Observatory (Observatoire de Bordeaux)	(France)	NA	Bordeaux-Floirac
A00	Gravesend Observatory	(United Kingdom)	-	Gravesend
A01	Masia Cal Maciarol Modul 2	(Spain)	-	Masia Cal Maciarol Modul 2
A02	Masia Cal Maciarol Modul 8	(Spain)	-	Masia Cal Maciarol Modul 8
A03	Torredembarra	(Spain)	CT	Torredembarra
A04	Saint-Caprais	(France)	Gironde	Saint-Caprais
A05	Bélesta Observatory (Observatoire de Bélesta), Ariège	(France)	-	Belesta
A06	Mataró	(Spain)	CT	Mataro
A07	Uranoscope Observatory or Gretz-Armainvilliers Observatory; observer: Arnaud Leroy	(France)	IDF	Gretz-Armainvilliers
A08	Malibert	(France)	-	Malibert
A09	Quincampoix	(France)	Normandy	Quincampoix
A10	Observatorio Astronómico de Conbera	(Spain)	CT	Observatorio Astronomico de Corbera
A11	Wormhout	(France)	Nord	Wormhout
A12	Sozzago Astronomical Station (Stazione Astronomica di Sozzago); observers: Federico Manzini, Roberto Crippa	(Italy)	P	Stazione Astronomica di Sozzago
A13	Observatory Naef Épendes (Observatoire Robert A. Naef), Épendes	(Switzerland)	SWF	Observatoire Naef, Épendes
A14	Les Engarouines Observatory (Observatoire des Engarouines), Mallemort; observer: Laurent Bernasconi	(France)	-	Les Engarouines Observatory
A15	Josef Bresser Observatory (Josef-Bresser Sternwarte)	(Germany)	NRW	Josef Bresser Sternwarte, Borken
A16	Tentlingen Observatory (Sternwarte Tentlingen)	(Switzerland)	SWF	Tentlingen
A17	Guidestar Observatory	(Germany)	BW	Guidestar Observatory, Weinheim
A18	Herne Observatory	(Germany)	NRW	Herne
A19	Köln Observatory	(Germany)	NRW	Koln
A20	Sögel Observatory	(Germany)	NI	Sogel
A21	Irmtraut Observatory	(Germany)	RP	Irmtraut
A22	Starkenburg Observatory Heppenheim Asteroid Survey (SOHAS) (Starkenburg Sternwarte-SOHAS, see #611)	(Germany)	-	Starkenburg Sternwarte-SOHAS
A23	Weinheim Observatory (Sternwarte Weinheim))	(Germany)	-	Weinheim
A24	New Millennium Observatory	(Italy)	Lo	New Millennium Observatory, Mozzate
A25	Nova Milanese	(Italy)	Lo	Nova Milanese
A26	Darmstadt Observatory	(Germany)	HE	Darmstadt
A27	Eridanus Observatory	(Germany)	NI	Eridanus Observatory, Langelsheim
A28	Kempten Observatory	(Germany)	FB	Kempten
A29	Santa Maria a Monte	(Italy)	Tu	Santa Maria a Monte
A30	Crespadoro Observatory	(Italy)	V	Crespadoro
A31	Corcaroli Observatory	(Italy)	-	Corcaroli Observatory
A32	Panker Observatory	(Germany)	-	Panker
A33	Kirchheim Observatory (Volkssternwarte Kirchheim)	(Germany)	-	Volkssternwarte Kirchheim
A34	Grosshabersdorf	(Germany)	FB	Grosshabersdorf
A35	Hormersdorf Observatory	(Germany)	SN	Hormersdorf Observatory
A36	Ganda di Aviatico	(Italy)	Lo	Ganda di Aviatico
A37	Müggelheim	(Germany)	B	Mueggelheim
A38	Campocatino Automated Telescope	(Italy)	-	Campocatino Automated Telescope, Collepardo
A39	Altenburg Observatory	(Germany)	TH	Altenburg
A40	Pieta Observatory	(Malta)	-	Pieta
A41	Rezman Observatory	(Slovenia)	-	Rezman Observatory, Kamnik
A42	Gehrden Observatory	(Germany)	-	Gehrden
A43	Inastars Observatory (before 2006)	(Germany)	-	Inastars Observatory, Potsdam (before 2006)
A44	Altschwendt Observatory	(Austria)	UA	Altschwendt
A45	Karrenkneul	(Germany)	-	Karrenkneul
A46	Lelekovice	(Czech Republic)	-	Lelekovice
A47	Matera	(Italy)	-	Matera
A48	Povegliano Veronese	(Italy)	-	Povegliano Veronese
A49	Uppsala University-Ångström Laboratory	(Sweden)	-	Uppsala-Angstrom
A50	Andrushivka Astronomical Observatory	(Ukraine)	-	Andrushivka Astronomical Observatory
A51	Danzig Observatory	(Poland)	-	Danzig
A52	Etyek Observatory	(Hungary)	-	Etyek
A53	Peschiera del Garda Observatory	(Italy)	-	Peschiera del Garda
A54	Ostrorog Observatory	(Poland)	-	Ostrorog
A55	Vallemare di Borbona Observatory (Osservatorio Astronomico Vallemare di Borbona)	(Italy)	-	Osservatorio Astronomico Vallemare di Borbona
A56	Parma Observatory	(Italy)	-	Parma
A57	Margherita Hack Observatory (Osservatorio Astronomico Margherita Hack)	(Italy)	-	Osservatorio Astron. Margherita Hack, Firenze
A58	Chalandray-Canotiers Observatory (Observatoire de Chalandray-Canotiers)	(France)	-	Observatoire de Chalandray-Canotiers
A59	Karlovy Vary Observatory	(Czech Republic)	-	Karlovy Vary Observatory
A60	Yonsei Survey Telescopes for Astronomical Research (YSTAR)	(South Africa)	NC	YSTAR-NEOPAT Station, Sutherland
A61	Tortona Observatory	(Italy)	P	Tortona
A62	Aichtal Observatory	(Germany)	BW	Aichtal
A63	Cosmosoz Observatory	(France)	Lyon	Cosmosoz Obs., Tassin la Demi Lune
A64	Couvaloup de St-Cergue Observatory	(France)	-	Couvaloup de St-Cergue
A65	Le Couvent de Lentin Observatory	(France)	-	Le Couvent de Lentin
A66	Livorno Observatory (Stazione Osservativa Astronomica, Livorno)	(Italy)	Tu	Stazione Osservativa Astronomica, Livorno
A67	Chiusa di Pesio Observatory	(Italy)	-	Chiusa di Pesio
A68	Swedenborg Observatory	(Sweden)	-	Swedenborg Obs., Bockholmwik
A69	Osservatorio Palazzo Bindi Sergardi	(Italy)	-	Osservatorio Palazzo Bindi Sergardi
A70	Lumijoki	(Finland)	Ostrobothnia	Lumijoki
A71	Stixendorf	(Austria)	-	Stixendorf
A72	Radebeul Observatory (Sternwarte "Adolph Diesterweg" Radebeul)	(Germany)	-	Radebeul Observatory
A73	Penzing Astrometric Observatory	(Austria)	Vi	Penzing Astrometric Obs., Vienna
A74	Bergen-Enkheim Observatory	(Germany)	-	Bergen-Enkheim Observatory
A75	Fort Pius Observatory	(Spain)	CT	Fort Pius Observatory, Barcelona
A76	Andromeda Observatory	(Hungary)	-	Andromeda Observatory, Miskolc
A77	Chante-Perdrix Observatory (Observatoire Chante-Perdrix); observers: Jérôme Caron, François Kugel	(France)	Haute-Provence	Observatoire Chante-Perdrix, Dauban
A78	Stia	(Italy)	-	Stia
A79	Obshtestvo Observatory	(Bulgaria)	-	Zvezdno Obshtestvo Observatory, Plana
A80	Lindenberg Observatory	(Germany)	BB	Lindenberg Observatory
A81	Balzaretto Observatory	(Italy)	La	Balzaretto Observatory, Rome
A82	Astronomical Observatory of Trieste (Osservatorio Astronomico di Trieste)	(Italy)	-	Osservatorio Astronomico di Trieste
A83	Jakokoski Observatory	(Finland)	-	Jakokoski Observatory
A84	TÜBİTAK National Observatory	(Turkey)	-	TUBITAK National Observatory
A85	Odesa Astronomical Observatory	(Ukraine)	-	Odesa Astronomical Observatory, Kryzhanivka, Odesa Oblast
A86	Albigneux Observatory	(France)	-	Albigneux
A87	Rimbach Observatory	(Germany)	-	Rimbach
A88	Bolzaneto Observatory	(Italy)	Li	Bolzaneto
A89	Sterni Observatory	(Germany)	FB	Sterni Observatory, Kempten
A90	Sant Gervasi Observatory; observer: Hilari Pallares	(Spain)	CT	Sant Gervasi Observatory, Barcelona
A91	Hankasalmi Observatory	(Finland)	-	Hankasalmi Observatory
A92	Urseanu Observatory	(Romania)	-	Urseanu Observatory, Bucharest
A93	Lucca Observatory	(Italy)	-	Lucca
A94	Cormons Observatory	(Italy)	-	Cormons
A95	Taurus Hill Observatory	(Finland)	EF	Taurus Hill Observatory, Varkaus
A96	Klosterneuburg Observatory	(Austria)	LA	Klosterneuburg
A97	Stammersdorf Observatory	(Austria)	Vi	Stammersdorf
A98	Taurus-1 Observatory	(Belarus)	-	Taurus-1 Observatory, Baran
A99	Monte Baldo Observatory (Osservatorio del Monte Baldo)	(Italy)	-	Osservatorio del Monte Baldo
B00	Savigny-le-Temple Observatory, observer: Patrick Sogorb	(France)	-	Savigny-le-Temple
B01	Taunus Observatory (Taunus-Sternwarte)	(Germany)	-	Taunus Observatory, Frankfurt
B02	Kielce Observatory	(Poland)	-	Kielce
B03	Alter Satzberg Observatory	(Austria)	Vi	Alter Satzberg, Vienna
B04	OAVdA Observatory (Osservatorio Astrononomico della Regione Autonoma Valle d'Aosta), Aosta Valley	(Italy)	-	OAVdA, Saint-Barthelemy
B05	Ka-Dar Observatory, Barybino	(Russia)	Moscow	Ka-Dar Observatory, Barybino
B06	Montseny Astronomical Observatory	(Spain)	-	Montseny Astronomical Observatory
B07	Camorino Observatory	(Switzerland)	SWI	Camorino
B08	San Lazzaro di Savena Observatory	(Italy)	ER	San Lazzaro di Savena
B09	Capannoli, Pietro Dora Vivarelli ASA	(Italy)	-	Capannoli
B10	Observatoire du Mas des Gres, Moydans (LightBuckets as of November 2011)	(France)	-	Observatoire des Baronnies Provencales, Moydans
B11	Cima Rest Observatory (Osservatorio Cima Rest), Imola	(Italy)	Lo	Osservatorio Cima Rest, Magasa
B12	Koschny Observatory	(Netherlands)	Zuid Holland	Koschny Observatory, Noordwijkerhout
B13	Osservatorio di Tradate	(Italy)	Lo	Osservatorio di Tradate
B14	Ca del Monte Observatory	(Italy)	-	Ca del Monte
B15	Inastars Observatory	(Germany)	-	Inastars Observatory, Potsdam (since 2006)
B16	1st Moscow Gymnasium Observatory, Lipki	(Russia)	Moscow	1st Moscow Gymnasium Observatory, Lipki
B17	AZT-8 Yevpatoria	(Ukraine)	-	AZT-8 Yevpatoria
B18	Terskol Observatory, on Mount Elbrus	(Russia)	North Caucasus	Terskol
B19	Observatori Iluro, Mataró	(Spain)	CT	Observatorio Iluro, Mataro
B20	Observatori Carmelita, Tiana	(Spain)	-	Observatorio Carmelita, Tiana
B21	Gaisberg Observatory (Sternwarte Gaisberg) in Schärding: observer Richard Gierlinger	(Austria)	UA	Gaisberg Observatory, Schaerding
B22	Observatori d'Àger, Barcelona	(Spain)	CT	Observatorio d'Ager
B23	Fiamene	(Italy)	-	Fiamene
B24	Cesson	(France)	-	Cesson
B25	Catania	(Italy)	-	Catania
B26	Observatoire des Terres Blanches, Reillanne	(France)	AHP	Observatoire des Terres Blanches, Reillanne
B27	Picard Observatory, St. Veit	(Austria)	-	Picard Observatory, St. Veit
B28	Mandi Observatory, Pagnacco	(Italy)	F	Mandi Observatory, Pagnacco
B29	L'Ampolla Observatory, Tarragona	(Spain)	-	L'Ampolla Observatory, Tarragona
B30	Szamotuly-Galowo	(Poland)	-	Szamotuly-Galowo
B31	Southern African Large Telescope (SALT), Sutherland	(South Africa)	NC	Southern African Large Telescope, Sutherland
B32	Gelenau Observatory,	(Germany)	SN	Gelenau
B33	Libbiano Observatory, Peccioli	(Italy)	-	Libbiano Observatory, Peccioli
B34	Green Island Observatory, Geçitkale	(Cyprus)	-	Green Island Observatory, Gecitkale
B35	Bareket Observatory, Macabim	(Israel)	-	Bareket Observatory, Macabim
B36	Redshed Observatory, Kallham	(Austria)	UA	Redshed Observatory, Kallham
B37	Ametlla del Valles Observatory (Observatorio de L' Ametlla del Vallès), Barcelona; observer: Antonio Garrigós-Sánchez	(Spain)	CT	Obs. de L' Ametlla del Valles, Barcelona
B38	Santa Mama	(Italy)	-	Santa Mama
B39	Tradate	(Italy)	-	Tradate
B40	Skylive Observatory, Catania Italy Gruppo Astrofili Catanesi	(Italy)	-	Skylive Observatory, Catania
B41	Zlín Observatory	(Czech Republic)	-	Zlín Observatory
B42	Vitebsk	(Belarus)	-	Vitebsk
B43	Hennef	(Germany)	-	Hennef
B44	Eygalayes	(France)	-	Eygalayes
B45	Narama	(Poland)	-	Narama
B46	Sintini Observatory, Argenta	(Italy)	-	Sintini Observatory, Alfonsine
B47	Metsala Observatory, Espoo	(Finland)	-	Metsala Observatory, Espoo
B48	Bocholt	(Germany)	-	Bocholt
B49	Paus Observatory, Sabadell	(Spain)	-	Paus Observatory, Sabadell
B50	Corner Observatory, Durmersheim	(Germany)	-	Corner Observatory, Durmersheim
B51	Vallauris	(France)	-	Vallauris
B52	Observatorio El Far	(Spain)	-	Observatorio El Far
B53	Casal Lumbroso, Rome	(Italy)	La	Casal Lumbroso, Rome
B54	Àger	(Spain)	-	Ager
B55	Comeglians	(Italy)	-	Comeglians
B56	Observatorio Sant Pere, Mataró	(Spain)	-	Observatorio Sant Pere, Mataro
B57	Laietania Observatory, Parets del Vallès	(Spain)	-	Laietania Observatory, Parets del Valles
B58	Polaris Observatory, Budapest	(Hungary)	-	Polaris Observatory, Budapest
B59	Borken	(Germany)	-	Borken
B60	Deep Sky Observatorium, Bad Bentheim	(Germany)	-	Deep Sky Observatorium, Bad Bentheim
B61	Valldoreix Observatory, Sant Cugat del Valles	(Spain)	CT	Valldoreix Obs., Sant Cugat del Valles
B62	Brelingen	(Germany)	NI	Brelingen
B63	Solaris Observatory, Luczanowice	(Poland)	K	Solaris Observatory, Luczanowice
B64	Slope Rock Observatory, Hyvinkää	(Finland)	-	Slope Rock Observatory, Hyvinkaa
B65	Komakallio Observatory, Kirkkonummi	(Finland)	Uusimaa	Komakallio Observatory, Kirkkonummi
B66	Osservatorio Astronomico Naturalistico di Casasco "A. Zanassi"	(Italy)	-	Osservatorio di Casasco
B67	Mirasteilas Observatory (Sternwarte Mirasteilas)	(Switzerland)	SWG	Sternwarte Mirasteilas, Falera
B68	Mount Matajur Observatory	(Italy)	-	Mount Matajur Observatory
B69	Owls and Ravens Observatory, Holzgerlingen	(Germany)	BW	Owls and Ravens Observatory, Holzgerlingen
B70	Sant Celoni	(Spain)	-	Sant Celoni
B71	Observatorio El Vendrell	(Spain)	-	Observatorio El Vendrell
B72	Soerth	(Germany)	-	Soerth
B73	Mauren Valley Observatory, Holzgerlingen	(Germany)	-	Mauren Valley Observatory, Holzgerlingen
B74	Santa Maria de Montmagastrell Observatory (Remote Observatory Santa Maria de Montmagastrell), Tàrrega	(Spain)	CT	Santa Maria de Montmagastrell
B75	Stazione Astronomica Betelgeuse, Magnago	(Italy)	-	Stazione Astronomica Betelgeuse, Magnago
B76	Sternwarte Schönfeld, Dresden	(Germany)	-	Sternwarte Schonfeld, Dresden
B77	Schafmatt Observatory, Aarau	(Switzerland)	SWG	Schafmatt Observatory, Aarau
B78	Astrophoton Observatory, Audorf	(Austria)	-	Astrophoton Observatory, Audorf
B79	Marana Observatory	(Italy)	-	Marana Observatory
B80	Osservatorio Astronomico Campomaggiore	(Italy)	B	Osservatorio Astronomico Campomaggiore
B81	Observatorio Astronómico Caimari observers: Mateu Cerda, Mateu Esteban, Pére Antoni Salom	(Spain)	-	Caimari
B82	Maidbronn Observatory	(Germany)	FB	Maidbronn
B83	Gières Observatory	(France)	ARA	Gieres
B84	Cyclops Observatory, Oostkapelle	(Netherlands)	Zeeland	Cyclops Observatory, Oostkapelle
B85	Beilen Observatory	(Netherlands)	Drenthe	Beilen Observatory
B86	Hagen Observatory (Volkssternwarte Hagen); also note: #607	(Germany)	NRW	Sternwarte Hagen
B87	Banyoles Observatory	(Spain)	CT	Banyoles
B88	Bigmuskie Observatory	(Italy)	P	Bigmuskie Observatory, Mombercelli
B89	Observatori Astronòmic de Tiana, Barcelona	(Spain)	CT	Observatori Astronomic de Tiana
B90	Malina River Observatory, Povoletto	(Italy)	F	Malina River Observatory, Povoletto
B91	Bollwiller	(France)	Haut-Rhin	Bollwiller
B92	Chinon Observatory (Observatoire de Chinon); observer: Maurice Audejean	(France)	CVL	Chinon
B93	Hoogeveen	(Netherlands)	Drenthe	Hoogeveen
B94	Petrozavodsk	(Russia)	-	Petrozavodsk
B95	Achternholt	(Germany)	NI	Achternholt
B96	Brixiis Observatory, Kruibeke	(Belgium)	-	Brixiis Observatory, Kruibeke
B97	Sterrenwacht Andromeda	(Netherlands)	Drenthe	Sterrenwacht Andromeda, Meppel
B98	Siena	(Italy)	Tu	Siena
B99	Santa Coloma de Gramenet	(Spain)	CT	Santa Coloma de Gramenet
C00	Velikie Luki Observatory	(Russia)	-	Velikie Luki
C01	Lohrmann Observatory (Lohrmann-Observatorium)	(Germany)	-	Lohrmann-Observatorium, Triebenberg
C02	Royal Park Observatory (Observatorio Royal Park)	(Spain)	-	Observatorio Royal Park
C03	Clayhole Observatory	(Finland)	-	Clayhole Observatory, Jokela
C04	Observatory Kramatorsk	(Ukraine)	-	Kramatorsk
C05	Königsleiten Observatory	(Austria)	-	Konigsleiten
C06	Krasnoyarsk Observatory (Siberian State Aerospace University)	(Russia)	-	Krasnoyarsk
C07	Anysllum Observatory	(Spain)	-	Anysllum Observatory, Àger
C08	Fiby Observatory	(Sweden)	-	Fiby
C09	Rouet Observatory	(France)	-	Rouet
C10	Maisoncelles Observatory	(France)	-	Maisoncelles
C11	City Observatory	(Czech Republic)	-	City Observatory, Slaný
C12	Berta Observatory	(Spain)	-	Berta Observatory, Sabadell
C13	Como Observatory	(Italy)	-	Como
C14	Sky Vistas Observatory	(Austria)	-	Sky Vistas Observatory, Eichgraben
C15	ISON-Ussuriysk	(Russia)	-	ISON-Ussuriysk Observatory
C16	Isarwinkel Observatory	(Germany)	-	Isarwinkel Observatory, Bad Tölz
C17	Joan Roget Observatory (Observatorio Joan Roget)	(Spain)	-	Observatorio Joan Roget, Àger
C18	Frasnes-Lez-Anvaing Observatory	(Belgium)	-	Frasnes-Lez-Anvaing
C19	ROSA Observatory	(France)	-	ROSA Observatory, Vaucluse
C20	Kislovodsk Mtn. Astronomical Station of the Pulkovo Obs.	(Russia)	-	Kislovodsk Mtn. Astronomical Stn., Pulkovo Obs.
C21	Via Lactea Observatory (Observatorio Via Lactea)	(Spain)	-	Observatorio Via Lactea, Àger
C22	Oberwiesenthal Observatory	(Germany)	-	Oberwiesenthal
C23	Olmen Observatory	(Belgium)	-	Olmen
C24	Seveso Observatory	(Italy)	Lo	Seveso
C25	Pulkovo Observatory Station at Campo Imperatore	(Italy)	-	Pulkovo Observatory Station, Campo Imperatore
C26	Levendaal Observatory	(Netherlands)	Zuid Holland	Levendaal Observatory, Leiden
C27	Pallerols Observatory	(Spain)	-	Pallerols
C28	Wellinghofen Observatory	(Germany)	-	Wellinghofen
C29	Les Planes de Son Observatory (Observatori Astronómic de Les Planes de Son)	(Spain)	-	Observatori Astronomic de Les Planes de Son
C30	Sheltozero Station of the Petrozavodsk University Obs.	(Russia)	-	Petrozavodsk University Obs., Sheltozero Stn.
C31	Neanderhoehe Hochdahl Observatory (Sternwarte Neanderhoehe Hochdahl e.V.)	(Germany)	-	Sternwarte Neanderhoehe Hochdahl e.V., Erkrath
C32	Ka-Dar Observatory, TAU Station	(Russia)	-	Ka-Dar Observatory, TAU Station, Nizhny Arkhyz
C33	CEAM Observatory (Observatorio CEAM)	(Spain)	CN	Observatorio CEAM, Caimari
C34	Baja Astronomical Observatory	(Hungary)	-	Baja Astronomical Observatory
C35	Terrassa Observatory	(Spain)	-	Terrassa
C36	Starry Wanderer Observatory	(Belarus)	-	Starry Wanderer Observatory, Baran'
C37	Stowupland Observatory	(United Kingdom)	ENG	Stowupland
C38	Varuna Observatory	(Italy)	-	Varuna Observatory, Cuorgnè
C39	Nijmegen Observatory	(Netherlands)	Gelderland	Nijmegen
C40	Kuban State University Astrophysical Observatory	(Russia)	-	Kuban State University Astrophysical Observatory
C41	MASTER-II Observatory (at Pulkovo Observatory; #084)	(Russia)	-	MASTER-II Observatory, Kislovodsk
C42	Xingming Observatory	(China)	-	Xingming Observatory, Mt. Nanshan
C43	Hoyerswerda Observatory	(Germany)	-	Hoyerswerda
C44	A. Volta Observatory	(Italy)	-	A. Volta Observatory, Lanzo d'Intelvi
C45	MPC1 Cassia Observatory	(Italy)	-	MPC1 Cassia Observatory, La Giustiniana
C46	Horizon Observatory	(Kazakhstan)	-	Horizon Observatory, Petropavlovsk
C47	Nonndorf Observatory	(Austria)	-	Nonndorf
C48	Sayan Solar Observatory	(Russia)	-	Sayan Solar Observatory, Irkutsk
C49	STEREO-A (space observatory)	SPACE	Earth-trailing	STEREO-A
C50	STEREO-B (space observatory)	SPACE	Earth-trailing	STEREO-B
C51	WISE (space observatory)	SPACE	Sun-synchronous	WISE
C52	Swift (space observatory)	SPACE	LEO	Swift
C53	NEOSSat (space observatory)	SPACE	Sun-synchronous	NEOSSat
C54	New Horizons (space observatory)	SPACE	deep space	New Horizons
C55	Kepler (space observatory)	SPACE	-	Kepler
C56	LISA Pathfinder (space observatory)	SPACE	-	LISA-Pathfinder
C57	TESS (space observatory)	SPACE	High Earth	TESS
C59	Yang Wang-1	SPACE	LEO?	Yangwang-1
C60	Argelander Institute for Astronomy Observatory	(Germany)	-	Argelander Institute for Astronomy Obs., Bonn
C61	Chelles Observatory	(France)	-	Chelles
C62	Eurac Observatory, observer: Titouan	(Italy)	-	Eurac Observatory, Bolzano
C63	Giuseppe Piazzi Observatory	(Italy)	-	Giuseppe Piazzi Observatory, Ponte in Valtellina
C64	Puchenstuben Observatory	(Austria)	-	Puchenstuben
C65	Montsec Observatory (Observatori Astronòmic del Montsec)	(Spain)	-	Observatori Astronomic del Montsec
C66	El Cielo de Consell Observatory (Observatorio El Cielo de Consell)	(Spain)	IB	Observatorio El Cielo de Consell
C67	Gnevsdorf Observatory	(Germany)	-	Gnevsdorf
C68	Ellinogermaniki Agogi Observatory	(Greece)	-	Ellinogermaniki Agogi Observatory, Pallini
C69	Bayerwald Observatory (Bayerwald Sternwarte)	(Germany)	-	Bayerwald Sternwarte, Neuhütte
C70	Uiterstegracht Station	(Netherlands)	Zuid Holland	Uiterstegracht Station, Leiden
C71	Sant Marti Sesgueioles Observatory	(Spain)	-	Sant Marti Sesgueioles
C72	Palestrina Observatory	(Italy)	-	Palestrina
C73	Galați Observatory	(Romania)	-	Galati Observatory
C74	El Teatrillo de Lyra Observatory (Observatorio El Teatrillo de Lyra)	(Spain)	-	Observatorio El Teatrillo de Lyra, Àger
C75	Whitestar Observatory	(Italy)	-	Whitestar Observatory, Borgobello
C76	Estels Observatory (Observatorio Estels)	(Spain)	-	Observatorio Estels, Àger
C77	Bernezzo Observatory	(Italy)	-	Bernezzo Observatory
C78	Martin S. Kraar Observatory	(Israel)	-	Martin S. Kraar Observatory, Rehovot
C79	Roser Observatory	(Spain)	-	Roser Observatory, Blanes
C80	Don Astronomical Observatory	(Russia)	-	Don Astronomical Observatory, Rostov-on-Don
C81	Dolomites Astronomical Observatory	(Italy)	-	Dolomites Astronomical Observatory
C82	Nastro Verde Observatory (Osservatorio Astronomico Nastro Verde)	(Italy)	-	Osservatorio Astronomico Nastro Verde, Sorrento
C83	Badalozhnyj Observatory	(Russia)	-	Badalozhnyj Observatory
C84	Badalona Observatory	(Spain)	-	Badalona
C85	Cala d'Hort Observatory (Observatorio Cala d'Hort)	(Spain)	-	Observatorio Cala d'Hort, Ibiza
C86	Blanes Observatory	(Spain)	-	Blanes
C87	Rimbach Observatory	(Germany)	-	Rimbach
C88	Montarrenti Observatory	(Italy)	-	Montarrenti Observatory, Siena
C89	Astronomical Station Vidojevica	(Serbia)	-	Astronomical Station Vidojevica
C90	Vinyols Observatory	(Spain)	-	Vinyols
C91	Montevenere Observatory	(Italy)	-	Montevenere Observatory, Monzuno
C92	Valdicerro Observatory	(Italy)	-	Valdicerro Observatory, Loreto
C93	Bellavista Observatory	(Italy)	-	Bellavista Observatory, L'Aquila
C94	MASTER-II Observatory	(Russia)	-	MASTER-II Observatory, Tunka
C95	SATINO Remote Observatory	(France)	PACA	SATINO Remote Observatory, Haute Provence
C96	OACL Observatory	(Italy)	-	OACL Observatory, Mosciano Sant Angelo
C97	Al-Fulaij Observatory	(Oman)	-	Al-Fulaij Observatory, Oman
C98	Casellina Observatory (Osservatorio Casellina)	(Italy)	-	Osservatorio Casellina, Scandicci
C99	Can Roig Observatory (Observatori Can Roig)	(Spain)	-	Observatori Can Roig, Llagostera
D00	ASC-Kislovodsk Observator (formerly ISON-Kislovodsk Observatory)	(Russia)	-	ASC-Kislovodsk
D01	Andean Northern Observatory	(Finland)	-	Andean Northern Observatory, Nummi-Pusula
D02	Petit Sant Feliu Observatory (Observatori Petit Sant Feliu), Sant Feliu de Llobregat	(Spain)	CT	Observatori Petit Sant Feliu
D03	Rantiga Observatory (Rantiga Osservatorio) Carpineti	(Italy)	-	Rantiga Osservatorio, Tincana
D04	Krasnodar Observatory	(Russia)	-	Krasnodar
D05	ISON-Terskol Observatory	(Russia)	-	ISON-Terskol Observatory
D06	Tuscolana Association of Astronomy (Associazione Tuscolana di Astronomia)	(Italy)	-	Associazione Tuscolana di Astronomia, Domatore
D07	Wegberg Observatory	(Germany)	NRW	Wegberg
D08	Ghezz Observatory	(Switzerland)	SWI	Ghezz Observatory, Leontica
D09	Observatory Grömme	(Belgium)	-	Observatory Gromme, Maasmechelen
D10	Gaertringen Observatory, Gärtringen	(Germany)	BW	Gaertringen
D11	Bastidan Observatory	(France)	Marseille	Bastidan Observatory
D12	Filzi School Observatory	(Italy)	S.Tirol	Filzi School Observatory, Laives
D13	Cat's Eye Observatory	(Italy)	Toscana	Cat's Eye Observatory
D14	Nanchuan Observatory	(China)	-	Nanchuan Observatory, Guangzhou
D15	F. Schiller-Gymnasium Observatory (Sternwarte Friedrich-Schiller-Gymnasium)	(Germany)	TH	Sternwarte F.Schiller-Gymnasium, Weimar
D16	Po Leung Kuk Observatory	(Hong Kong)	HK	Po Leung Kuk Observatory, Tuen Mun
D17	Hong Kong Observatory	(Hong Kong)	HK	Hong Kong
D18	Mount Guizi Observatory	(China)	-	Mt. Guizi Observatory
D19	Hong Kong Space Museum	(Hong Kong)	HK	Hong Kong Space Museum, Tsimshatsui
D20	Zadko Observatory	(Australia)	WA	Zadko Observatory, Wallingup Plain
D21	Shenton Park Observatory	(Australia)	WA	Shenton Park
D22	UWA Observatory	(Australia)	WA	UWA Observatory, Crawley
D24	LightBuckets Observatory	(Australia)	WA	LightBuckets Observatory, Pingelly
D25	Tzec Maun Observatory	(Australia)	WA	Tzec Maun Observatory, Pingelly (before 2010)
D29	PMO NEO Survey Program at the XuYi Station of the Purple Mountain Observatory	(China)	-	Purple Mountain Observatory, XuYi Station
D32	JiangNanTianChi Observatory	(China)	-	JiangNanTianChi Observatory, Mt. Getianling
D33	Kenting Observatory at Checheng	(Taiwan)	-	Kenting Observatory, Checheng
D34	Kenting Observatory at Hengchun	(Taiwan)	-	Kenting Observatory, Hengchun
D35	Lulin Observatory	(Taiwan)	-	Lulin Observatory
D36	Tataka Observatory	(Taiwan)	-	Tataka, Mt. Yu-Shan National Park
D37	Lulin Widefield Telescope, see #D35	(Taiwan)	-	Lulin Widefield Telescope, Mt. Lulin
D39	Shandong University Observatory	(China)	Weihai	Shandong University Observatory, Weihai
D44	Ishigakijima Astronomical Observatory	(Japan)	47	Ishigakijima Astronomical Observatory
D53	ISON-Blagovechensk Observatory	(Russia)	-	ISON-Blagoveschensk Observatory
D54	MASTER-II Observatory	(Russia)	-	MASTER-II Observatory, Blagoveshchensk
D55	Kangwon Science High School Observatory	(South Korea)	-	Kangwon Science High School Observatory, Ksho
D57	Gimhae Astronomical Observatory	(South Korea)	-	Gimhae Astronomical Observatory, Uhbang-dong
D58	KSA SEM Observatory	(South Korea)	-	KSA SEM Observatory, Danggam-dong
D60	Sparky's Stars, Masseris	ITA		Sparky's Stars, Masseris
D61	Suntopia Marina Observatory	(Japan)	-	Suntopia Marina, Sumoto
D62	Miyaki-Argenteus Observatory	(Japan)	-	Miyaki-Argenteus
D63	G. Pascoli Observatory	(Italy)	-	G. Pascoli Observatory, Castelvecchio Pascoli
D69	JMU Space-Observatory (University of Würzburg)	(Germany)	FB	JMU Space-Observatory
D70	Tosa Observatory	(Japan)	-	Tosa
D74	Nakagawa Observatory (Anan Science Center Nakagawa Observatory; Nakagawa Science Center Nakagawa Observatory)	(Japan)	-	Nakagawa
D78	Iga-Ueno Observatory	(Japan)	-	Iga-Ueno
D79	YSVP Observatory	(Australia)	SA	YSVP Observatory, Vale Park
D80	Gumma Astronomical Observatory (CHECK with: Gunma Astronomical Observatory,)	(Japan)	10	Gumma Astronomical Observatory
D81	Nagano Observatory	(Japan)	20	Nagano
D82	Wallaroo Observatory	(Australia)	SA	Wallaroo
D83	Miwa Observatory	(Japan)	-	Miwa
D84	Hallet Cove Observatory	(Australia)	SA	Hallet Cove
D85	Ingle Farm Observatory	(Australia)	SA	Ingle Farm
D86	Penwortham Observatory	(Australia)	SA	Penwortham
D87	Brooklyn Park Observatory	(Australia)	SA	Brooklyn Park
D88	Hiratsuka Observatory	(Japan)	-	Hiratsuka
D89	Yamagata Astronomical Observatory (Yamagata Tenmondai)	(Japan)	06	Yamagata
D90	RAS Observatory	(Australia)	SA	RAS Observatory, Moorook
D91	Hamanowa Astronomical Observatory (HAO), observers: Hiromi Hamanowa, Hiroko Hamanowa	(Japan)	13	Adati
D92	Osaki Observatory	(Japan)	-	Osaki
D93	Sendai Astronomical Observatory	(Japan)	-	Sendai Astronomical Observatory
D94	Takanezawa Observatory	(Japan)	09	Takanezawa, Tochigi
D95	Kurihara Observatory	(Japan)	-	Kurihara
D96	Tzec Maun Observatory	(Australia)	SA	Tzec Maun Observatory, Moorook
D97	Berri Observatory	(Australia)	SA	Berri
E00	Castlemaine Observatory	(Australia)	Vic	Castlemaine
E01	South Yarra (Barfold)	(Australia)	Vic	Barfold
E03	RAS Observatory	(Australia)	Vic	RAS Observatory, Officer
E04	Pacific Sky Observatory, Northern Mariana Islands	(United States)	MP	Pacific Sky Observatory, Saipan
E05	Earl Hill Observatory	(Australia)	Qld	Earl Hill Observatory, Trinity Beach
E07	Murrumbateman Observatory	(Australia)	NSW	Murrumbateman
E08	Wobblesock Observatory	(Australia)	NSW	Wobblesock Observatory, Coonabarabran
E09	Oakley Southern Sky Observatory	(Australia)	NSW	Oakley Southern Sky Observatory, Coonabarabran
E10	Faulkes Telescope South at Siding Spring	(Australia)	NSW	Siding Spring-Faulkes Telescope South
E11	Frog Rock Observatory	(Australia)	NSW	Frog Rock Observatory, Mudgee
E12	Siding Spring Survey	(Australia)	NSW	Siding Spring Survey
E13	Wanniassa Observatory	(Australia)	ACT	Wanniassa
E14	Hunters Hill Observatory; observer: David Higgins	(Australia)	ACT	Hunters Hill Observatory, Ngunnawal
E15	Magellan Observatory	(Australia)	NSW	Magellan Observatory, near Goulburn
E16	Grove Creek Observatory	(Australia)	NSW	Grove Creek Observatory, Trunkey
E17	Leura Observatory (renamed to "Blue Mountains Observatory", see: #Q68); observer: Julian Oey	(Australia)	NSW	Leura
E18	BDI Observatory, Bangor	(Australia)	NSW	BDI Observatory, Regents Park
E19	Kingsgrove Observatory	(Australia)	NSW	Kingsgrove
E20	Marsfield Observatory	(Australia)	NSW	Marsfield
E21	Norma Rose Observatory	(Australia)	Qld	Norma Rose Observatory, Leyburn
E22	University of Southern Queensland Observatory	(Australia)	Qld	Univ. of Southern Queensland Obs., Mt. Kent
E23	Arcadia Observatory	(Australia)	NSW	Arcadia
E24	Tangra Observatory	(Australia)	NSW	Tangra Observatory, St. Clair
E25	Rochedale (APTA)	(Australia)	Qld	Rochedale (APTA)
E26	RAS Observatory	(Australia)	Qld	RAS Observatory, Biggera Waters
E27	Thornlands Observatory	(Australia)	Qld	Thornlands
E28	Kuriwa Observatory	(Australia)	NSW	Kuriwa Observatory, Hawkesbury Heights
E81	Nelson Observatory	(New Zealand)	S	Nelson
E83	Wither Observatory	(New Zealand)	N	Wither Observatory, Witherlea
E85	Farm Cove Observatory, Auckland	(New Zealand)	Au	Farm Cove
E87	Turitea Observatory	(New Zealand)	N	Turitea
E89	Geyserland Observatory, Rotorua	(New Zealand)	N	Geyserland Observatory, Pukehangi
E94	Possum Observatory	(New Zealand)	N	Possum Observatory, Gisborne
F51	Pan-STARRS 1 (PS1) at Haleakala Observatory	(United States)	HI	Pan-STARRS 1, Haleakala
F52	Pan-STARRS 2 (PS2) at Haleakala Observatory	(United States)	HI	Pan-STARRS 2, Haleakala
F59	Ironwood Remote Observatory	(United States)	HI	Ironwood Remote Observatory, Hawaii
F60	Ironwood North Observatory	(United States)	HI	Ironwood Observatory, Hawaii
F65	Haleakala-Faulkes Telescope North	(United States)	HI	Haleakala-Faulkes Telescope North
F84	Hibiscus Observatory, Puna'auia	(French Polynesia)	-	Hibiscus Observatory, Punaauia
F85	Tiki Observatory, Puna'auia	(French Polynesia)	-	Tiki Observatory, Punaauia
F86	Moana Observatory, Puna'auia	(French Polynesia)	-	Moana Observatory, Punaauia
G00	AZM Martinsberg Observatory	(Austria)	-	AZM Martinsberg, Oed
G01	Oldenburg University Observatory (Universitätssternwarte Oldenburg)	(Germany)	NI	Universitaetssternwarte Oldenburg
G03	Capricornus Observatory, Csókakő	(Hungary)	-	Capricornus Observatory, Csokako
G04	Schuelerlabor Astronomie St. 7	(Germany)	NRW	Schuelerlabor Astronomie St. 7, Wuppertal
G05	Piconcillo Observatory	(Spain)	AN	Piconcillo, Sierra Morena
G06	Dordrecht, Sterrenburg	(Netherlands)	Zuid Holland	Dordrecht, Sterrenburg
G07	Millau Observatory Observatory	(France)	-	Millau Observatory
G08	Les Pedritxes Observatory	(Spain)	Cat	Observatorio Les Pedritxes, Matadepera
G09	SWF Observatory	(United Kingdom)	England	SWF Observatory, South Woodham Ferrers
G10	Clavier Observatory	(Spain)	-	Clavier Observatory, Lora Del Rio
G11	Breitenweg Observatory, Bergisch Gladbach	(Germany)	NRW	Breitenweg Observatory, Herkenrath
G12	EG Observatory (Sternwarte EG)	(Germany)	NRW	Sternwarte EG, Lippstadt
G13	Astronomihagen Observatory	(Norway)	-	Astronomihagen, Fannrem
G14	Novaloop Observatory	(France)	PACA	Novaloop Observatory, Mougins
G15	Magroforte Observatory	(Italy)	-	Magroforte Observatory, Alessandria
G16	OmegaLab Observatory	(Italy)	Si	OmegaLab Observatory, Palermo
G17	BAS Observatory	(Italy)	Tu	BAS Observatory, Scandicci
G18	ALMO Observatory	(Italy)	ER	ALMO Observatory, Padulle
G19	Immanuel Kant Observatory	(Germany)	-	Immanuel Kant Observatory, Limbach
G20	Brignoles Observatory	(France)	-	Brignoles Observatory
G21	Castrofilippo Observatory (Osservatorio Castrofilippo)	(Italy)	-	Osservatorio Castrofilippo
G22	Experimenta Observatory	(Germany)	-	Experimenta Observatory, Heilbronn
G23	Vulpecula Observatory	(Hungary)	-	Vulpecula Observatory, Budapest
G24	Dettenhausen Observatory	(Germany)	BW	Dettenhausen
G25	Sherbrooke Observatory	(Canada)	QC	Sherbrooke
G26	Fushan Observatory	(China)	Shaanxi	Fushan Observatory, Mt Shaohua
G27	Telescope Fabra ROA Montsec (TFRM), Sant Esteve de la Sarga, Lleida	(Spain)	CT	Fabra Observatory, Montsec
G28	Wyncroft Observatory	(United Kingdom)	ENG	Wyncroft Observatory, Attleborough
G29	Requena Observatory	(Spain)	-	Requena
G30	Casselman Observatory	(Canada)	ON	Casselman
G31	CCAT Trieste Observatory	(Italy)	-	CCAT Trieste
G32	Elena Remote Observatory	(Chile)	Af	Elena Remote Observatory, San Pedro de Atacama
G33	Wickede Observatory	(Germany)	NRW	Wickede
G34	Oberfrauendorf Observatory	(Germany)	-	Oberfrauendorf
G35	Elephant Head Observatory	(United States)	AZ	Elephant Head Observatory, Sahuarita
G36	Calar Alto-CASADO	(Spain)	-	Calar Alto-CASADO
G37	Lowell Discovery Telescope	(United States)	AZ	Lowell Observatory-Lowell Discovery Telescope
G38	La Senda Observatory (Observatorio La Senda)	(Spain)	CLM	Observatorio La Senda, Cabanillas del Campo
G39	ROAD Observatory	(Chile)	Af	ROAD, San Pedro de Atacama
G40	Slooh Observatory	(Spain)	CN	Slooh.com Canary Islands Observatory
G41	Insperity Observatory	(United States)	TX	Insperity Observatory, Humble
G42	UAdeC Observatory (Observatorio Astronómico UAdeC; Autonomous University of Coahuila)	(Mexico)	-	Observatorio Astronomico UAdeC, Saltillo
G43	Buenaventura Suarez Observatory (Observatorio Buenaventura Suarez)	(Argentina)	D	Observatorio Buenaventura Suarez, San Luis
G44	Longa Vista Observatory (Observatorio Longa Vista), Itatiba	(Brazil)	SP	Observatorio Longa Vista, São Paulo
G45	Space Surveillance Telescope (SST) (moved in 2017, from Atom Site, NM, USA, to Australia)	(Australia)	WA	Exmouth, Western Australia
G46	Northwest Florida State College Observatory	(United States)	FL	Pinto Valley Observatory
G47	HillTopTop Observatory	(United States)	NM	HillTopTop Observatory, Edgewood
G48	Doc Greiner Research Observatory	(United States)	NM	Harlingten Research Observatory, Rancho Hildalgo
G49	Minnetonka Observatory	(United States)	MN	Minnetonka
G50	Organ Mesa Observatory, observer: Frederick Pilcher	(United States)	NM	Organ Mesa Observatory, Las Cruces
G51	Byrne Observatory	(United States)	CA	Byrne Observatory, Sedgwick Reserve
G52	Stone Edge Observatory	(United States)	CA	Stone Edge Observatory, El Verano
G53	Alder Springs Observatory	(United States)	CA	Alder Springs Observatory, Auberry
G54	Hemet Observatory	(United States)	CA	Hemet
G55	Bakersfield Observatory	(United States)	CA	Bakersfield
G56	Walnut Creek Observatory	(United States)	CA	Walnut Creek
G57	Dilbert Observatory	(United States)	OR	Dilbert Observatory, Forest Grove
G58	Chabot Space and Science Center	(United States)	CA	Chabot Space and Science Center, Oakland
G59	Maiden Lane Observatory	(United States)	WA	Maiden Lane Obs., Bainbridge Island
G60	Carroll Observatory	(United States)	CA	Carroll Observatory, Montecito
G61	Pleasanton Observatory	(United States)	CA	Pleasanton
G62	Sunriver Nature Center Observatory	(United States)	OR	Sunriver Nature Center Observatory, Sunriver
G63	Mill Creek Observatory	(United States)	OR	Mill Creek Observatory, The Dalles
G64	Blue Canyon Observatory	(United States)	CA	Blue Canyon Observatory
G65	Vulcan North Observatory at Lick Observatory	(United States)	CA	Vulcan North, Lick Observatory, Mount Hamilton
G66	Lake Forest Observatory	(United States)	CA	Lake Forest Observatory, Forest Hills
G67	Rancho del Sol Observatory	(United States)	CA	Rancho Del Sol, Camino
G68	Sierra Stars Observatory	(United States)	CA	Sierra Stars Observatory, Markleeville
G69	Via Capote Observatory; observer: James W. Brinsfield	(United States)	CA	Via Capote Sky Observatory, Thousand Oaks
G70	Francisquito Observatory	(United States)	CA	Francisquito Observatory, Los Angeles
G71	Rancho Palos Verdes Observatory	(United States)	CA	Rancho Palos Verdes
G72	University Hills Observatory	(United States)	CA	University Hills
G73	Mount Wilson-TIE	(United States)	CA	Mount Wilson-TIE
G74	Boulder Knolls Observatory	(United States)	CA	Boulder Knolls Observatory, Escondido
G75	Starry Knight Observatory	(United States)	CA	Starry Knight Observatory, Coto de Caza
G76	Altimira Observatory	(United States)	CA	Altimira Observatory, Coto de Caza
G77	Baldwin Lake Observatory	(United States)	CA	Baldwin Lake
G78	Desert Wanderer Observatory	(United States)	CA	Desert Wanderer Observatory, El Centro
G79	Goat Mountain Astronomical Research Station (GMARS); observer: Robert Stephens (also see #646 and #U81)	(United States)	CA	Goat Mountain Astronomical Research Station
G80	Sierra Remote Observatories	(United States)	CA	Sierra Remote Observatories, Auberry
G81	Temecula Observatory	(United States)	CA	Temecula
G82	SARA Observatory (Southeastern Association for Research in Astronomy)	(United States)	AZ	SARA Observatory, Kitt Peak
G83	Large Binocular Telescope	(United States)	AZ	Mt. Graham-LBT
G84	Mount Lemmon Sky Center	(United States)	AZ	Mount Lemmon SkyCenter
G85	Vermillion Cliffs Observatory	(United States)	UT	Vermillion Cliffs Observatory, Kanab
G86	Tucson-Winterhaven Observatory	(United States)	AZ	Tucson-Winterhaven
G87	Calvin M. Hooper Memorial Observatory	(United States)	UT	Calvin M. Hooper Memorial Observatory, Hyde Park
G88	LAMP Observatory	(United States)	AZ	LAMP Observatory, New River
G89	Kachina Observatory	(United States)	AZ	Kachina Observatory, Flagstaff
G90	Three Buttes Observatory	(United States)	AZ	Three Buttes Observatory, Tucson
G91	2MASS (Two Micron All-Sky Survey) at Whipple Obs. (see #696)	(United States)	AZ	Whipple Observatory, Mt. Hopkins—2MASS
G92	Jarnac Observatory	(United States)	AZ	Jarnac Observatory, Vail
G93	Sonoita Research Observatory	(United States)	AZ	Sonoita Research Observatory, Sonoita
G94	Sonoran Skies Observatory	(United States)	AZ	Sonoran Skies Observatory, St. David
G95	Hereford Arizona Observatory	(United States)	AZ	Hereford Arizona Observatory, Hereford
G96	Mount Lemmon Survey	(United States)	AZ	Mt. Lemmon Survey
G97	Astronomical League Alpha Observatory	(United States)	AZ	Astronomical League Alpha Observatory, Portal
G98	Calvin-Rehoboth Robotic Observatory	(United States)	NM	Calvin-Rehoboth Observatory, Rehoboth
G99	NF Observatory	(United States)	NM	NF Observatory, Silver City
H00	Tyrone Observatory	(United States)	NM	Tyrone
H01	Magdalena Ridge Observatory, New Mexico Tech	(United States)	NM	Magdalena Ridge Observatory, Socorro
H02	Sulphur Flats Observatory	(United States)	NM	Sulphur Flats Observatory, La Cueva
H03	Sandia View Observatory	(United States)	NM	Sandia View Observatory, Rio Rancho
H04	Santa Fe Observatory	(United States)	NM	S
H05	Edmund Kline Observatory	(United States)	CO	Edmund Kline Observatory, Deer Trail
H06	Remote Astronomical Society Observatory of New Mexico, a.k.a. RAS Observatory of New Mexico; New Mexico Skies Observatory; iTelescope Observatory	(United States)	NM	iTelescope Observatory, Mayhill
H07	7300 Observatory	(United States)	NM	7300 Observatory, Cloudcroft
H08	BlackBird Observatory; observer: Ken Levin	(United States)	NM	BlackBird Observatory, Cloudcroft
H09	Antelope Hills Observatory; observer: Robert A. Koff (also see #713)	(United States)	CO	Antelope Hills Observatory, Bennett
H10	Tzec Maun Observatory (Tzec Maun Foundation Observatory at Mayhill; also see Cloudcroft location: #V29)	(United States)	NM	Tzec Maun Observatory, Mayhill
H11	LightBuckets Observatory, Rodeo (LightBuckets re-located to #B10 in 2011)	(United States)	NM	LightBuckets Observatory, Rodeo
H12	TechDome, Mayhill	(United States)	NM	TechDome, Mayhill
H13	Lenomiya Observatory	(United States)	AZ	Lenomiya Observatory, Casa Grande
H14	Morning Star Observatory, Tucson	(United States)	AZ	Morning Star Observatory, Tucson
H15	ISON-NM, Mayhill	(United States)	NM	ISON-NM Observatory, Mayhill
H16	HUT Observatory, Eagle	(United States)	CO	HUT Observatory, Eagle
H17	Angel Peaks Observatory	(United States)	CO	Angel Peaks Observatory
H18	Vail	(United States)	AZ	Vail View Observatory, Vail
H19	Lone Star Observatory	(United States)	OK	Lone Star Observatory, Caney
H20	Eastern Illinois University Obs.	(United States)	IL	Eastern Illinois University Obs., Charleston
H21	Astronomical Research Observatory or Astronomical Research Institute	(United States)	IL	Astronomical Research Observatory, Westfield
H22	Terre Haute	(United States)	IN	Terre Haute
H23	Pear Tree Observatory	(United States)	FL	Pear Tree Observatory, Valparaiso
H24	J. C. Veen Observatory	(United States)	MI	J. C. Veen Observatory, Lowell
H25	Harvest Moon Observatory	(United States)	MN	Harvest Moon Observatory, Northfield
H26	Doc Greiner Research Observatory, also see #G48	(United States)	WI	Doc Greiner Research Observatory, Janesvillle
H27	Moonglow Observatory	(United States)	MO	Moonglow Observatory, Warrensburg
H28	Preston Hills Observatory (different from Preston Gott Observatory, Texas Tech University, north of Lubbock; observer: Maurice Clark)	(United States)	TX	Preston Hills Observatory, Celina
H29	Ivywood Observatory	(United States)	OK	Ivywood Observatory, Edmond
H30	University of Oklahoma Observatory	(United States)	OK	University of Oklahoma Observatory, Norman
H31	Star Ridge Observatory	(United States)	TX	Star Ridge Observatory, Weimar
H32	Texas A&M Physics Observatory, College Station	(United States)	TX	Texas A&M Physics Observatory, College Station
H33	Bixhoma Observatory, Bixby	(United States)	OK	Bixhoma Observatory, Bixby
H34	Chapel Hill Observatory	(United States)	TX	Chapel Hill
H35	Leavenworth Observatory	(United States)	KS	Leavenworth
H36	Sandlot Observatory	(United States)	KS	Sandlot Observatory, Scranton
H37	Grems Timmons Observatories	(United States)	IA	Grems Timmons Observatories, Graettinger
H38	Timberline Observatory	(United States)	IA	Timberline Observatory, Urbandale
H39	S.O.S. Observatory (Shed of Science Observatory; SOS); observer: Richard Durkee	(United States)	MN	S.O.S. Observatory, Minneapolis
H40	Nubbin Ridge Observatory	(United States)	AR	Nubbin Ridge Observatory
H41	Petit Jean Mountain	(United States)	AR	Petit Jean Mountain
H42	Wartburg College Observatory	(United States)	IA	Wartburg College Observatory, Waverly
H43	Conway Observatory	(United States)	AR	Conway
H44	Cascade Mountain Observatory	(United States)	AR	Cascade Mountain
H45	Arkansas Sky Observatory	(United States)	AR	Arkansas Sky Obs., Petit Jean Mountain South
H46	Ricky Observatory	(United States)	MO	Ricky Observatory, Blue Springs
H47	Vicksburg Observatory	(United States)	MS	Vicksburg
H48	PSU Greenbush Observatory	(United States)	KS	PSU Greenbush Observatory, Pittsburg
H49	ATU Astronomical Observatory	(United States)	AR	ATU Astronomical Observatory, Russellville
H50	University of Central Arkansas Observatory	(United States)	AR	University of Central Arkansas Obs., Conway
H51	Greiner Research Observatory	(United States)	WI	Greiner Research Observatory, Verona
H52	Hawkeye Observatory	(United States)	IL	Hawkeye Observatory, Durand
H53	Thompsonville Observatory	(United States)	IL	Thompsonville
H54	Cedar Drive Observatory	(United States)	WI	Cedar Drive Observatory, Pulaski
H55	Astronomical Research Observatory, formerly known as Antares Observatory (also see observatory #X39 in Argentina)	(United States)	IL	Astronomical Research Observatory, Charleston
H56	Northbrook Meadow Observatory	(United States)	IL	Northbrook Meadow Observatory
H57	Ohio State University Observatory	(United States)	OH	Ohio State University Observatory, Lima
H58	NASA/MSFC ALaMO	(United States)	AL	NASA/MSFC ALaMO, Redstone Arsenal
H59	Prairie Grass Observatory	(United States)	IN	Prairie Grass Observatory, Camp Cullom
H60	Heartland Observatory	(United States)	IN	Heartland Observatory, Carmel
H61	Newcastle Observatory	(Canada)	-	Newcastle
H62	Calvin College Observatory	(United States)	MI	Calvin College Observatory
H63	DeKalb Observatory, observer: Don Starkey	(United States)	IN	DeKalb Observatory, Auburn
H64	Thomas More College Observatory	(United States)	KY	Thomas More College Observatory, Crestview Hills
H65	Waltonfields Observatory	(United States)	KY	Waltonfields Observatory, Walton
H66	Yellow Springs Observatory	(United States)	OH	Yellow Springs
H67	Stonegate Observatory	(United States)	MI	Stonegate Observatory, Ann Arbor
H68	Red Barn Observatory	(United States)	GA	Red Barn Observatory, Ty Ty
H69	Ohio Wesleyan University	(United States)	OH	Perkins Observatory, Delaware
H70	Asheville Observatory	(United States)	NC	Asheville
H71	Chula Observatory	(United States)	GA	Chula
H72	Evelyn L. Egan Observatory	(United States)	FL	Evelyn L. Egan Observatory, Fort Myers
H73	Lakeland Astronomical Observatory	(United States)	FL	Lakeland Astronomical Observatory, Kirtland
H74	Bar J Observatory	(United States)	FL	Bar J Observatory, New Smyrna Beach
H75	Indian Hill North Observatory	(United States)	OH	Indian Hill North Observatory, Huntsburg
H76	Oakridge Observatory	(United States)	FL	Oakridge Observatory, Miami
H77	Buehler Observatory	(United States)	FL	Buehler Observatory
H78	University of Nariño Observatory	(Colombia)	-	University of Narino Observatory, Pasto
H79	York University Observatory	(Canada)	ON	York University Observatory, Toronto
H80	Halstead Observatory	(United States)	NJ	Halstead Observatory, Princeton
H81	Hartung-Boothroyd Observatory	(United States)	NY	Hartung-Boothroyd Observatory, Ithaca
H82	CBA-NOVAC Observatory	(United States)	VA	CBA-NOVAC Observatory, Front Royal
H83	Timberlake Observatory	(United States)	VA	Timberlake Observatory, Oakton
H84	Northview Observatory	(United States)	NY	Northview Observatory, Mendon
H85	Silver Spring Observatory	(United States)	MD	Silver Spring
H86	CBA-East Observatory	(United States)	MD	CBA-East Observatory, Laurel
H87	Fenwick Observatory	(United States)	VA	Fenwick Observatory, Richmond
H88	Hope Observatory	(United States)	MD	Hope Observatory, Belcamp
H89	Galaxy Blues Observatory	(Canada)	QC	Galaxy Blues Observatory, Gatineau
H90	Ottawa Observatory	(Canada)	ON	Ottawa
H91	Reynolds Observatory	(United States)	NY	Reynolds Observatory, Potsdam
H92	Arcturus Observatory	(United States)	NJ	Arcturus Observatory
H93	Berkeley Heights Observatory	(United States)	NJ	Berkeley Heights
H94	Cedar Knolls Observatory	(United States)	NJ	Cedar Knolls
H95	NJIT Observatory	(United States)	NJ	NJIT Observatory, Newark
H96	Observatoire des Pléïades	(Canada)	QC	Observatoire des Pleiades, Mandeville
H97	Talcott Mountain Science Center	(United States)	CT	Talcott Mountain Science Center, Avon
H98	Dark Roseanne Observatory	(United States)	CT	Dark Rosanne Obs., Middlefield
H99	Sunhill Observatory	(United States)	MA	Sunhill Observatory, Newton
I00	Carbuncle Hill Observatory; observer: Donald Pray (also see #912)	(United States)	RI	Carbuncle Hill Observatory, Coventry
I01	Clay Center Observatory	(United States)	MA	Clay Center Observatory, Brookline
I02	Two Micron All-Sky Survey (2MASS), at #807	(Chile)	Co	Cerro Tololo Observatory, La Serena—2MASS
I03	Astrovirtel (Accessing Astronomical Archives as Virtual Telescopes)	(Chile)	-	European Southern Obs., La Silla—ASTROVIRTEL
I04	Mamalluca Observatory, Vicuña	(Chile)	Co	Mamalluca Observatory
I05	Las Campanas Observatory-TIE	(Chile)	-	Las Campanas Observatory-TIE
I06	Werner Schmidt Observatory, Dennis-Yarmouth Regional HS, South Yarmouth	(United States)	MA	Werner Schmidt Obs., Dennis-Yarmouth Regional HS
I07	Conlin Hill Observatory	(United States)	MA	Conlin Hill Observatory, Oxford
I08	Alianza S4 Observatory, El Leoncito	(Argentina)	J	Alianza S4, Cerro Burek
I09	Cerro Murphy Observatory	(Chile)	Af	Observatorio Cerro Murphy – OCM
I10	CAO – Campo Catino Austral Observatory Survey (CAOS)	(Chile)	Af	CAO, San Pedro de Atacama (until 2012)
I11	Gemini South (Gemini South Observatory)	(Chile)	-	Gemini South Observatory, Cerro Pachón
I12	Phillips Academy Observatory	(United States)	MA	Phillips Academy Observatory, Andover
I13	Burleith Observatory	(United States)	D.C.	Burleith Observatory, Washington D.C.
I14	Tigh Speuran Observatory	(United States)	MA	Tigh Speuran Observatory, Framingham
I15	Wishing Star Observatory	(United States)	MA	Wishing Star Observatory, Barrington
I16	IAA-AI Atacama Observatory	(Chile)	Af	IAA-AI Atacama, San Pedro de Atacama
I17	Thomas G. Cupillari Observatory	(United States)	PA	Thomas G. Cupillari Observatory, Fleetville
I18	Fan Mountain Observatory	(United States)	VA	Fan Mountain Observatory, Covesville
I19	El Gato Gris Observatory (Observatorio El Gato Gris)	(Argentina)	Cór	Observatorio El Gato Gris, Tanti
I20	Salvador Observatory (Observatorio Astronomico Salvador)	(Argentina)	Cór	Observatorio Astronomico Salvador, Rio Cuarto
I21	El Condor Observatory	(Argentina)	Cór	El Condor Observatory, Córdoba
I22	Abbey Ridge Observatory, observer: David Lane	(Canada)	NS	Abbey Ridge Observatory, Stillwater Lake
I23	Frosty Cold Observatory	(United States)	ME	Frosty Cold Observatory, Mash Harbor
I24	Lake of the Woods Observatory	(United States)	VA	Lake of the Woods Observatory, Locust Grove
I25	ECCCO Observatory	(Argentina)	Cór	ECCCO Observatory, Bosque Alegre
I26	Kappa Crucis Observatory (Observatorio Kappa Crucis)	(Argentina)	Cór	Observatorio Kappa Crucis, Cordoba
I27	Barred Owl Observatory	(Canada)	-	Barred Owl Observatory, Carp
I28	Starhoo Observatory	(United States)	MA	Starhoo Observatory, Lakeville
I29	Middlesex School Observatory	(United States)	MA	Middlesex School Observatory, Concord
I30	Geminis Austral Observatory (Observatorio Geminis Austral)	(Argentina)	S	Observatorio Geminis Austral
I31	Colegio Cristo Rey Observatory (Observatorio Astronomico del Colegio Cristo Rey), Rosario	(Argentina)	S	Observatorio Astronomico del Colegio Cristo Rey
I32	Beta Orionis Observatory (Observatorio Beta Orionis)	(Argentina)	S	Observatorio Beta Orionis, Rosario
I33	Southern Astrophysical Research Telescope (SOAR)	(Chile)	-	SOAR, Cerro Pachon
I34	Morgantown Observatory	(United States)	PA	Morgantown
I35	Sidoli Observatory (Observatorio Sidoli)	(Argentina)	BA	Sidoli
I36	Los Campitos Observatory (Observatorio Los Campitos), Cañuelas	(Argentina)	BA	Observatorio Los Campitos, Cañuela
I37	Astrodomi Observatory	(Argentina)	BA	Astrodomi Observatory, Santa Rita
I38	Los Algarrobos Observatory (Observatorio Los Algarrobos)	(Uruguay)	-	Observatorio Los Algarrobos, Salto
I39	Cruz del Sur Observatory (Observatorio Cruz del Sur)	(Argentina)	BA	Observatorio Cruz del Sur, San Justo
I40	TRAPPIST – Transiting Planets and Planetesimals Small Telescope	(Chile)	-	La Silla—TRAPPIST
I41	Zwicky Transient Facility (ZTF) and its predecessor Palomar Transient Factory (PTF) at Palomar Observatory	(United States)	CA	Palomar Mountain—PTF; Palomar Mountain—ZTF
I42	Westport Observatory	(United States)	FL	Westport Observatory
I43	Tarleton State University Observatory	(United States)	TX	Tarleton State University Obs., Stephenville
I44	Northwest Florida State College	(United States)	FL	Northwest Florida State College, Niceville
I45	Observatorio W Crucis	(Argentina)	BA	W Crucis Astronomical Observatory, San Justo
I46	The Cottage Observatory	(United States)	PA	The Cottage Observatory, Altoona
I47	Pierre Auger Observatory	(Argentina)	M	Pierre Auger Observatory, Malargüe
I48	El Catalejo Observatory (Observatorio El Catalejo), La Pampa	(Argentina)	L	Observatorio El Catalejo, Santa Rosa
I49	Sunflower Observatory	(United States)	NM	Sunflower Observatory, Santa Fe
I50	P2 Observatory	(United States)	NM	P2 Observatory, Mayhill
I51	Clinton Observatory	(United States)	MD	Clinton
I52	Mount Lemmon Observatory (CHECK: Mount Lemmon Survey) of the Steward Observatory	(United States)	AZ	Steward Observatory, Mt. Lemmon Station
I53	Armilla Observatory	(Spain)	-	Armilla
I54	Las Vaguadas Observatory (Observatorio Las Vaguadas)	(Spain)	-	Observatorio Las Vaguadas, Badajoz
I55	Valencia Observatory	(Spain)	-	V
I56	John Beckman Observatory (Observatorio Astronómico John Beckman)	(Spain)	-	Observatorio Astronomico John Beckman, Almería
I57	Elche Observatory	(Spain)	-	Elche
I58	Bétera Observatory	(Spain)	-	Betera
I59	Antares Observatory (Observatorio Antares), Camargo, Cantabria	(Spain)	-	Observatorio Fuente de los matos, Muriedas
I60	Guernanderf Observatory	(France)	-	Guernanderf
I61	Ourense Observatory	(Spain)	-	Ourense
I62	Helios Ontigola Observatory (Observatorio Helios Ontigola)	(Spain)	-	Observatorio Helios Ontigola
I63	Cygnus Observatory	(United Kingdom)	-	Cygnus Observatory, New Airesford
I64	Maidenhead Observatory	(United Kingdom)	-	Maidenhead
I65	Yunquera Observatory	(Spain)	-	Yunquera
I66	Taurus Australis Observatory	(Brazil)	DF	Taurus Australis Observatory, Brasília
I67	Hartley Wintney Observatory	(United Kingdom)	-	Hartley Wintney
I68	Pousada dos Anoẽs Observatory	(Brazil)	-	Pousada dos Anoes Observatory
I69	AGM Observatory	(Morocco)	-	AGM Observatory, Marrakech
I70	Gedney House Observatory	(United Kingdom)	ENG	Gedney House Observatory, Kirton
I71	Los Milanos Observatory (Observatorio Los Milanos)	(Spain)	-	Observatorio Los Milanos, Caceres
I72	Carpe-Noctem Observatory (Observatorio Carpe-Noctem)	(Spain)	MD	Observatorio Carpe-Noctem, Madrid
I73	Salvia Observatory	(France)	-	Salvia Observatory, Saulges
I74	Baxter Garden Observatory	(United Kingdom)	ENG	Baxter Garden Observatory, Salisbury
I75	Castellon Observatory (Observatorio Castellon)	(Spain)	-	Observatorio Castellon
I76	Tesla Observatory	(Spain)	-	Observatorio Tesla, Valdemorillo
I77	CEAMIG-REA Observatory	(Brazil)	MG	CEAMIG-REA Observatory, Belo Horizonte
I78	Principia Observatory (Observatorio Principia)	(Spain)	-	Observatorio Principia, Málaga
I79	AstroCamp Observatory	(Spain)	-	AstroCamp, Nerpio
I80	Rose Cottage Observatory	(United Kingdom)	ENG	Rose Cottage Observatory, Keighley
I81	Tarbatness Observatory	(United Kingdom)	SCT	Tarbatness Observatory, Portmahomack
I82	Güímar Observatory	(Spain)	CN	Guimar
I83	Cherryvalley Observatory	(Republic of Ireland)	-	Cherryvalley Observatory, Rathmolyon
I84	Cerro del Viento Observatory	(Spain)	-	Cerro del Viento, Badajoz
I85	Las Negras Observatory	(Spain)	-	Las Negras
I86	UCM Observatory (Observatorio UCM)	(Spain)	MD	Observatorio UCM, Madrid
I87	Astroshot Observatory	(Republic of Ireland)	-	Astroshot Observatory, Monasterevin
I88	Fuensanta de Martos Observatory	(Spain)	-	Fuensanta de Martos
I89	RAS Observatory	(Spain)	-	iTelescope Observatory, Nerpio
I90	Blackrock Castle Observatory	(Republic of Ireland)	-	Blackrock Castle Observatory
I91	Retamar Observatory	(Spain)	-	Retamar
I92	Astreo Observatory	(Spain)	-	Astreo Observatory, Mairena del Aljarafe
I93	Saint Pardon de Conques Observatory	(France)	-	St Pardon de Conques
I94	Rho Ophiocus Observatory (Observatorio Rho Ophiocus)	(Spain)	MD	Observatorio Rho Ophiocus, Las Rozas de Madrid
I95	Hita Observatory (Observatorio de la Hita)	(Spain)	-	Observatorio de la Hita
I96	Hyperion Observatory	(Spain)	-	Hyperion Observatory, Urbanizacion Caraquiz
I97	Penn Heights Observatory	(United Kingdom)	-	Penn Heights Observatory, Rickmansworth
I98	El Berrueco Observatory	(Spain)	-	El Berrueco
I99	Blanquita Observatory (Observatorio Blanquita)	(Spain)	MD	Observatorio Blanquita, Vaciamadrid
J00	Segorbe Observatory	(Spain)	Castellon	Segorbe
J01	Cielo Profundo Observatory (Observatorio Cielo Profundo), Oviedo	(Spain)	-	Observatorio Cielo Profundo, Leon
J02	Busot Observatory	(Spain)	-	Busot
J03	Gothers Observatory	(United Kingdom)	-	Gothers Observatory, St. Dennis
J04	OGS Telescope	(Spain)	CN	ESA Optical Ground Station, Tenerife
J05	Bootes Observatory	(Spain)	-	Bootes Observatory, Boecillo
J06	Trent Astronomical Observatory	(United Kingdom)	-	Trent Astronomical Observatory, Clifton
J07	SPAG Monfragüe Observatory (Observatorio SPAG Monfragüe)	(Spain)	-	Observatorio SPAG Monfrague, Palazuelo-Empalme
J08	Zonalunar Observatory (Observatorio Zonalunar)	(Spain)	V	Observatorio Zonalunar, Puzol
J09	Balbriggan Observatory	(Republic of Ireland)	-	Balbriggan
J10	Alicante Observatory	(Spain)	-	Alicante
J11	Matosinhos Observatory	(Portugal)	-	Matosinhos
J12	Caraquiz Observatory	(Spain)	-	Caraquiz
J13	Liverpool Telescope at La Palma	(Spain)	CN	La Palma-Liverpool Telescope
J14	La Corte Observatory	(Spain)	-	La Corte
J15	Muxagata Observatory	(Portugal)	-	Muxagata
J16	An Carraig Observatory	(United Kingdom)	NIR	An Carraig Observatory, Loughinisland
J17	Ragdon Observatory	(United Kingdom)	-	Ragdon
J18	Dingle Observatory	(United Kingdom)	WLS	Dingle Observatory, Montgomery
J19	El Maestrat Observatory	(Spain)	-	El Maestrat
J20	Aravaca Observatory	(Spain)	-	Aravaca
J21	El Boalo Observatory	(Spain)	-	El Boalo
J22	Tacande Observatory	(Spain)	CN	Tacande Observatory, La Palma
J23	La Couyere Observatory (Centre Astronomique de La Couyere)	(France)	-	Centre Astronomique de La Couyere
J24	Altamira Observatory (Observatorio Altamira)	(Spain)	CN	Observatorio Altamira
J25	Penamayor Observatory	(Spain)	-	Penamayor Observatory, Nava
J26	The Spaceguard Centre	(United Kingdom)	-	The Spaceguard Centre, Knighton
J27	El Guijo Observatory	(Spain)	-	El Guijo Observatory
J28	Jaén Observatory (Observatorio Jaén)	(Spain)	-	Jaen
J29	Nira Observatory (Observatorio Nira)	(Spain)	-	Observatorio Nira, Tias
J30	Ventilla Observatory (Observatorio Ventilla)	(Spain)	MD	Observatorio Ventilla, Madrid
J31	La Axarquia Observatory	(Spain)	-	La Axarquia
J32	Aljaraque Observatory	(Spain)	-	Aljaraque
J33	Bayfordbury Observatory	(United Kingdom)	ENG	University of Hertfordshire Obs., Bayfordbury
J34	La Fecha Observatory	(Spain)	-	La Fecha
J35	Tucci Observatory	(Spain)	-	Tucci Observatory, Martos
J36	DiezALaOnce Observatory (Observatorio DiezALaOnce)	(Spain)	-	Observatorio DiezALaOnce, Illana
J37	Huelva Observatory	(Spain)	-	Huelva
J38	La Vara Observatory (Observatorio La Vara)	(Spain)	-	Observatorio La Vara, Valdés
J39	Ingenio Observatory	(Spain)	-	Ingenio
J40	Málaga Observatory	(Spain)	-	Malaga
J41	Raheny Observatory	(Republic of Ireland)	-	Raheny
J42	Puzol Observatory (Punto de Observación de Puçol; POP), observer: Amadeo Aznar	(Spain)	V	Puzol
J43	Oukaïmeden Observatory, Oukaïmeden, location of project MOSS	(Morocco)	-	Oukaimeden Observatory, Marrakech
J44	Iturrieta Observatory (Observatorio Iturrieta)	(Spain)	-	Observatorio Iturrieta, Alava
J45	MT Cabreja Observatory (Observatorio Montana Cabreja), Gran Canaria	(Spain)	CN	Observatorio Montana Cabreja, Vega de San Mateo
J46	MT Blanca Observatory (Observatorio Montana Blanca)	(Spain)	-	Observatorio Montana Blanca, Tias
J47	Nazaret Observatory (Observatorio Nazaret)	(Spain)	-	Observatorio Nazaret
J48	Observatory Mackay	(Spain)	-	Observatory Mackay, La Laguna
J49	Santa Pola Observatory	(Spain)	-	Santa Pola
J50	NEON Observatory at La Palma	(Spain)	CN	La Palma-NEON
J51	Atlante Observatory (Observatorio Atlante)	(Spain)	CN	Observatorio Atlante, Tenerife
J52	Pinsoro Observatory (Observatorio Pinsoro)	(Spain)	-	Observatorio Pinsoro
J53	Posadas Observatory	(Spain)	-	Posadas
J54	Bradford Robotic Telescope, Tenerife	(Spain)	CN	Bradford Robotic Telescope
J55	Los Altos de Arguineguin Observatory	(Spain)	-	Los Altos de Arguineguin Observatory
J56	La Avejerilla Observatory (Observatorio La Avejerilla)	(Spain)	-	Observatorio La Avejerilla
J57	Alto Turia Observatory (Centro Astronómico Alto Turia)	(Spain)	V	Centro Astronomico Alto Turia, Valencia
J58	Brynllefrith Observatory	(United Kingdom)	WLS	Brynllefrith Observatory, Llantwit Fardre
J59	Linceo Observatory (Observatorio Linceo)	(Spain)	CB	Observatorio Linceo, Santander
J60	Tocororo Observatory	(Spain)	CL	Tocororo Observatory, Arquillinos
J61	Brownstown Observatory	(Republic of Ireland)	-	Brownstown Observatory, Kilcloon
J62	Kingsland Observatory	(Republic of Ireland)	-	Kingsland Observatory, Boyle
J63	San Gabriel Observatory	(Spain)	-	San Gabriel
J64	La Mata Observatory	(Spain)	-	La Mata
J65	Celbridge Observatory	(Republic of Ireland)	-	Celbridge
J66	Kinver Observatory	(United Kingdom)	-	Kinver
J67	La Pobla de Vallbona Observatory (Observatorio La Pobla de Vallbona)	(Spain)	V	Observatorio La Pobla de Vallbona
J68	Tweenhills Observatory, Gloucestershire	(United Kingdom)	ENG	Tweenhills Observatory, Hartpury
J69	North Observatory	(United Kingdom)	ENG	North Observatory, Clanfield
J70	Vega del Thader Observatory (Observatorio Astronómico Vega del Thader)	(Spain)	-	Obs. Astronomico Vega del Thader, El Palmar
J71	Willow Bank Observatory, Lancashire	(United Kingdom)	ENG	Willow Bank Observatory
J72	Valle del Sol Observatory	(Spain)	-	Valle del Sol
J73	Quainton Observatory, Buckinghamshire	(United Kingdom)	ENG	Quainton
J74	Bilbao Observatory	(Spain)	Biscay	Bilbao
J75	La Sagra Observatory (Observatorio Astronómico de La Sagra; OLS); a remote station of OAM, see #620	(Spain)	-	OAM Observatory, La Sagra
J76	La Murta Observatory	(Spain)	-	La Murta
J77	Golden Hill Observatory, Dorset	(United Kingdom)	ENG	Golden Hill Observatory, Stourton Caundle
J78	Murcia Observatory	(Spain)	-	Murcia
J79	Calarreona Observatory (Observatorio Calarreona)	(Spain)	Murcia	Observatorio Calarreona, Águilas
J80	Sainte-Hélène Observatory, Sainte-Hélène, Gironde	(France)	-	Sainte Helene
J81	Guirguillano Observatory	(Spain)	-	Guirguillano
J82	Leyland Observatory	(United Kingdom)	-	Leyland
J83	Olive Farm Observatory	(United Kingdom)	-	Olive Farm Observatory, Hoghton
J84	South Observatory	(United Kingdom)	-	South Observatory, Clanfield
J85	Makerstoun Observatory	(United Kingdom)	-	Makerstoun
J86	Sierra Nevada Observatory (Observatorio de Sierra Nevada; OSN), Loma de Dilar	(Spain)	Granada	Sierra Nevada Observatory
J87	La Cañada Observatory (Observatorio de La Cañada), Ávila	(Spain)	CL	La Canada
J88	Strawberry Field Observatory	(United Kingdom)	ENG	Strawberry Field Obs., Southampton
J89	Tres Cantos Observatory	(Spain)	-	Tres Cantos Observatory
J90	West Challow Observatory	(United Kingdom)	-	West Challow
J91	Alt emporda Observatory	(Spain)	-	Alt emporda Observatory, Figueres
J92	Beaconsfield Observatory	(United Kingdom)	-	Beaconsfield
J93	Mount Tuffley Observatory	(United Kingdom)	ENG	Mount Tuffley Observatory, Gloucester
J94	Abbeydale Observatory, Gloucester	(United Kingdom)	ENG	Abbeydale
J95	Great Shefford Observatory, Berkshire	(United Kingdom)	ENG	Great Shefford
J96	Cantabria Observatory (Observatorio de Cantabria)	(Spain)	CB	Observatorio de Cantabria
J97	Alginet Observatory	(Spain)	V	Alginet
J98	Manises Observatory (Observatorio Manises)	(Spain)	V	Observatorio Manises
J99	Burjassot Observatory	(Spain)	V	Burjassot
K00	Hanau Observatory	(Germany)	-	Hanau
K01	Astrognosis Observatory	(United Kingdom)	-	Astrognosis Observatory, Bradwell
K02	Eastwood Observatory	(United Kingdom)	-	Eastwood Observatory, Leigh on Sea
K03	Montsec Observatory (Observatori Astronòmic del Montsec; OAdM)	(Spain)	CT	Observatori AAS Montsec
K04	Lo Fossil Observatory	(Spain)	CT	Lo Fossil Observatory, Àger
K05	Eden Observatory	(United Kingdom)	ENG	Eden Observatory, Banham
K06	Montagut Observatory (Observatorio Montagut)	(Spain)	CT	Observatorio Montagut, Can Sola
K07	Gravelle Observatory (Observatoire de Gravelle)	(France)	Paris	Observatoire de Gravelle, St. Maurice
K08	Lledoner Observatory (Observatorio Lledoner)	(Spain)	CT	Observatorio Lledoner, Vallirana
K09	Llica d'Amunt Observatory (Observatori Astronomic de Lliçà d'Amunt)	(Spain)	-	Llica d'Amunt
K10	Micro Palomar	(France)	-	Micro Palomar, Reilhanette
K11	Pommier Observatory (Observatoire de Pommier)	(France)	-	Observatoire de Pommier
K12	Marratxi Observatory (Observatorio Astronómico de Marratxi)	(Spain)	-	Observatorio Astronomico de Marratxi
K13	Albireo Observatory	(Spain)	-	Albireo Observatory, Inca
K14	Sencelles Observatory (Observatorio de Sencelles)	(Spain)	-	Observatorio de Sencelles
K15	Murviel-lès-Montpellier Observatory	(France)	-	Murviel-les-Montpellier
K16	Reilhanette Observatory	(France)	-	Reilhanette
K17	Valentines Observatory (Observatoire des Valentines)	(Switzerland)	SWF	Observatoire des Valentines, Bex
K18	Hésingue Observatory	(France)	-	Hesingue
K19	PASTIS Observatory	(France)	-	PASTIS Observatory, Banon
K20	Danastro Observatory	(Belgium)	-	Danastro Observatory, Romerée
K21	Saint-Saturnin-lès-Avignon	(France)	-	Saint-Saturnin-les-Avignon
K22	Les Barres Observatory	(France)	-	Les Barres Observatory, Lamanon
K23	Gorgonzola Observatory	(Italy)	-	Gorgonzola
K24	Schmelz Observatory	(Germany)	-	Schmelz
K25	Haute Provence Sud, Saint-Michel-l'Observatoire, see #511	(France)	PACA	Haute Provence Sud, Saint-Michel-l'Observatoire
K26	Contern	(Luxembourg)	-	Contern
K27	St-Martin Observatory, Amathay Vésigneux	(France)	-	St-Martin Observatory, Amathay Vesigneux
K28	Sternwarte Eckdorf	(Germany)	-	Sternwarte Eckdorf
K29	Stellarium Gornergrat	(Switzerland)	SWG	Stellarium Gornergrat
K30	Lüscherz Observatory	(Switzerland)	SWG	Luscherz
K31	Osservatorio Astronomico di Bellino	(Italy)	-	Osservatorio Astronomico di Bellino
K32	Maritime Alps Observatory, Cuneo	(Italy)	-	Maritime Alps Observatory, Cuneo
K33	San Defendente	(Italy)	-	San Defendente
K34	Turin	(Italy)	-	Turin
K35	Huenfelden Observatory	(Germany)	-	Huenfelden
K36	Ebersheim Observatory	(Germany)	-	Ebersheim
K37	Cereseto Observatory	(Italy)	-	Cereseto
K38	M57 Observatory	(Italy)	-	M57 Observatory, Saltrio
K39	Serra Observatory	(Italy)	-	Serra Observatory
K40	Altdorf Observatory	(Germany)	-	Altdorf
K41	Vegaquattro Astronomical Observatory	(Italy)	-	Vegaquattro Astronomical Obs., Novi Ligure
K42	Knielingen Observatory	(Germany)	-	Knielingen
K43	OVM Observatory	(Italy)	Lo	OVM Observatory, Chiesa in Valmalencom
K44	Marienburg Observatory (Marienburg Sternwarte)	(Germany)	-	Marienburg Sternwarte, Hildesheim
K45	Punta Falcone Observatory (Osservatorio Astronomico di Punta Falcone)	(Italy)	-	Oss. Astronomico di Punta Falcone, Piombino
K46	Bamberg Observatory	(Germany)	-	Bamberg
K47	BSCR Observatory	(Italy)	-	BSCR Observatory, Santa Maria a Monte
K48	Keyhole Observatory	(Italy)	-	Keyhole Observatory, San Giorgio di Mantova
K49	Carpione Observatory	(Italy)	-	Carpione Observatory, Spedaletto
K50	Feuerstein Observatory (Sternwarte Feuerstein)	(Germany)	-	Sternwarte Feuerstein, Ebermannstadt
K51	Celado Observatory (Osservatorio del Celado)	(Italy)	-	Osservatorio del Celado, Castello Tesino
K52	Gwen Observatory	(Italy)	-	Gwen Observatory, San Francesco al Campo
K53	Marina di Cerveteri	(Italy)	-	Marina di Cerveteri
K54	Astronomical Observatory University of Siena	(Italy)	-	Astronomical Observatory University of Siena
K55	Wallhausen Observatory	(Germany)	-	Wallhausen
K56	Osservatorio di Foligno	(Italy)	-	Osservatorio di Foligno
K57	Fiore Observatory	(Italy)	-	Fiore Observatory
K58	Gevelsberg Observatory	(Germany)	-	Gevelsberg
K59	Elsterland Observatory, Jeßnigk	(Germany)	-	Elsterland Observatory, Jessnigk
K60	Lindby Observatory	(Sweden)	-	Lindby
K61	Rokycany Observatory	(Czech Republic)	-	Rokycany Observatory
K62	Teplice Observatory	(Czech Republic)	-	Teplice Observatory
K64	Waizenreuth Observatory	(Germany)	-	Waizenreuth
K65	Cesena Observatory	(Italy)	-	Cesena
K66	Osservatorio Astronomico di Anzio	(Italy)	-	Osservatorio Astronomico di Anzio
K67	Bayerwald Sternwarte, Spiegelau, see #C69	(Germany)	-	Bayerwald Sternwarte, Spiegelau
K68	Osservatorio Elianto	(Italy)	-	Osservatorio Elianto, Pontecagnano
K69	Riethnordhausen Observatory	(Germany)	-	Riethnordhausen
K70	Rosarno Observatory	(Italy)	-	Rosarno
K71	Neutraubling Observatory	(Germany)	-	Neutraubling
K72	Celico Observatory	(Italy)	-	Celico
K73	Gravina in Puglia	(Italy)	-	Gravina in Puglia
K74	Muensterschwarzach Observatory	(Germany)	-	Muensterschwarzach Observatory, Schwarzach
K75	Astro Dolomites Observatory	(Italy)	-	Astro Dolomites, Santa Cristina Valgardena
K76	BSA Osservatorio	(Italy)	-	BSA Osservatorio, Savigliano
K77	EHB01 Observatory	(Germany)	-	EHB01 Observatory, Engelhardsberg
K78	Iota Scorpii Observatory, obs.: Giulio Scarfì	(Italy)	Li	Iota Scorpii Observatory, La Spezia
K79	Erfurt Observatory	(Germany)	TH	Erfurt
K80	Platanus Observatory	(Poland)	WV	Platanus Observatory, Lusówko
K81	P.M.P.H.R. Deep Sky Observatory	(Italy)	La	P.M.P.H.R. Deep Sky Observatory, Atina
K82	Alphard Observatory	(Italy)	-	Alphard Observatory, Ostuni
K83	Beppe Forti Astronomical Observatory	(Italy)	Tu	Beppe Forti Astronomical Observatory, Montelupo
K84	Felliscopio Observatory	(Italy)	ER	Felliscopio Observatory, Fellicarolo
K85	Kelmis Observatory	(Belgium)	VAL	Kelmis
K86	Brescia Observatory	(Italy)	Lo	Brescia
K87	Dettelbach Vineyard Observatory	(Germany)	FB	Dettelbach Vineyard Observatory
K88	GINOP-KHK, (see #461, #561 and #053), GINOP program:	(Hungary)	-	GINOP-KHK, Piszkéstető
K89	Digital Stargate Observatory	(Italy)	Tu	Digital Stargate Observatory, Manciano
K90	Sopot Astronomical Observatory	(Serbia)	-	Sopot Astronomical Observatory
K91	Sutherland-LCO A	(South Africa)	-	Sutherland-LCO A
K92	Sutherland-LCO B	(South Africa)	-	Sutherland-LCO B
K93	Sutherland-LCO C	(South Africa)	-	Sutherland-LCO C
K94	Sutherland Observatory	(South Africa)	-	Sutherland
K95	MASTER-SAAO Telescope	(South Africa)	-	MASTER-SAAO Observatory, Sutherland
K96	Savelli Observatory, Savelli	(Italy)	Cal	Savelli Observatory
K97	Freconrupt Observatory	(France)	BR	Freconrupt
K98	6ROADS Observatory 1	(Poland)	WV	6ROADS Observatory 1, Wojnowko
K99	Derenivka Observatory	(Ukraine)	-	Derenivka Observatory
L00	East Rome Observatory	(Italy)	-	East Rome Observatory, Rome
L01	Tičan Observatory (new Višnjan Observatory), also see #120	(Croatia)	–	Višnjan Observatory, Tičan
L02	NOAK Observatory	(Greece)	-	NOAK Observatory, Stavraki
L03	SGT Observatory	(Austria)	UA	SGT Observatory, Gaflenz
L04	ROASTERR-1 Observatory	(Romania)	-	ROASTERR-1 Observatory, Cluj-Napoca
L05	Dridri Observatory	(Italy)	Lo	Dridri Observatory, Franciacorta
L06	Sormano 2 Observatory, also see #587	(Italy)	Lo	Sormano 2 Observatory, Bellagio Via Lattea
L07	Salvatore di Giacomo Observatory (Osservatorio Salvatore di Giacomo)	(Italy)	Cam	Osservatorio Salvatore di Giacomo, Agerola
L08	Metsähovi Optical Telescope	(Finland)	-	Metsahovi Optical Telescope, Metsahovi
L09	Sutherland-LCO Aqawan	(South Africa)	NC	Sutherland-LCO Aqawan A #1
L10	Kryoneri Observatory, Kryoneri	(Greece)	-	Kryoneri Observatory
L11	Sandvreten Observatory	(Sweden)	Up	Sandvreten Observatory
L12	Koksijde Observatory	(Belgium)	VLG	Koksijde
L13	Stardust Observatory	(Romania)	-	Stardust Observatory, Brasov
L14	Vaulx-en-Velin Observatory	(France)	Lyon	Planetarium de Vaulx-en-Velin Observatory
L15	St. George Observatory (not to be confused with: St. George Observatory, Louisiana, USA)	(Romania)	-	St. George Observatory, Ploiești
L16	Stardreams Observatory	(Romania)	-	Stardreams Observatory, Valenii de Munte
L17	Albanyà Observatory, Albanyà	(Spain)	CT	Observatori Astronomic Albanya
L18	QOS Observatory	(Ukraine)	-	QOS Observatory, Zalistsi
L19	Felsina Observatory (Osservatorio Felsina) AAB, Montepastore	(Italy)	-	Osservatorio Felsina AAB, Montepastore
L20	Sarajevo Observatory	(Bosnia and Herzegovina)	-	AG\_Sarajevo Observatory, Sarajevo
L21	Ostrov Observatory	(Romania)	-	Ostrov Observatory, Constanta
L22	Bârlad Observatory	(Romania)	-	Barlad Observatory
L23	Schela Observatory	(Romania)	-	Schela Observatory
L24	Gauteng Observatory (Gauteng City-Region Observatory; GCRO)	(South Africa)	Gauteng	Gauteng
L25	Smolęcin Observatory	(Poland)	WPV	Smolecin
L26	Sanderphil Urban Observatory	(Italy)	La	Sanderphil Urban Observatory, Civitavecchia
L27	29PREMOTE Observatory	(France)	AHP	29PREMOTE Observatory, Dauban
L28	ISON-Castelgrande Observatory, Castelgrande, Basilicata	(Italy)	B	ISON-Castelgrande Observatory
L29	Drebach-South Observatory	(Namibia)	-	Drebach-South Observatory, Windhoek
L30	Lohbach Observatory, Benninghofen, Dortmund	(Germany)	NRW	Lohbach Observatory, Benninghofen
L31	RaSo Observatory	(Germany)	SN	RaSo Observatory, Chemnitz
L32	Korea Microlensing Telescope Network (at SAAO)	(South Africa)	-	Korea Microlensing Telescope Network-SAAO
L33	Ananjev Observatory (Private astronomical observatory Ananjev)	(Ukraine)	Odesa	Ananjev
L34	Galhassin Robotic Telescope	(Italy)	Si	Galhassin Robotic Telescope, Isnello
L35	DreamSky Observatory	(Ukraine)	-	DreamSky Observatory, Lisnyky
L36	BlueEye600 Telescope (at Ondřejov Observatory)	(Czech Republic)	-	Ondřejov—BlueEye600 Telescope
L37	Alnitak Observatory	(Spain)	Cádiz	Observatorio Alnitak, El Puerto de Santa María
L38	Schafsweide Observatory (Gartensternwarte Schafsweide)	(Germany)	-	Gartensternwarte Schafsweide, Schelde
L39	Spica Observatory (Osservatorio Spica)	(Italy)	-	Osservatorio Spica, Signa
L40	Rastpfuhl Observatory (Sternwarte Saarbruecken Rastpfuhl)	(Germany)	S	Sternwarte Saarbruecken Rastpfuhl
L41	Ponte Uso Observatory	(Italy)	-	Ponte Uso
L42	Observatory-Astrocamp Manciano	(Italy)	-	Observatory-Astrocamp Manciano
L43	Ager Observatory	(Spain)	CT	Ager, Leida
L44	AstroVal Observatory	(Switzerland)	SWF	, Le Chenit
L45	ObsCT Observatory	(Italy)	-	ObsCT, Catania
L46	Majadahonda Observatory	(Spain)	-	Observatorio Majadahonda
L47	Piobbico Observatory	(Italy)	-	Osservatorio Astronomico, Piobbico
L48	Baia Mare Observatory	(Romania)	-	Baia Mare
L49	Vega Observatory (VEGA-Sternwarte)	(Austria)	-	VEGA-Sternwarte, Dorfleiten
L50	GenShtab Observatory	(Republic of Crimea (Russia))	-	GenShtab Observatory, Nauchnij
L51	MARGO (Gennadiy Borisov's observatory)	(Republic of Crimea (Russia))	-	MARGO, Nauchnij
L52	MASTER-Tavrida	(Republic of Crimea (Russia))	-	MASTER-Tavrida
L53	Lomazzo Observatory	(Italy)	Lo	Lomazzo Observatory, Como
L54	Berthelot Observatory	(Romania)	-	Berthelot Observatory, Hunedoara
L55	Sura Gardens Observatory	(Ukraine)	-	Sura Gardens, Dnipro
L56	Limburg Observatory (Sternwarte Limburg)	(Germany)	Hesse	Sternwarte Limburg, Limburg
L57	Bacău Observatory, Bacău	(Romania)	-	Bacau Observatory, Bacau
L58	Heavenly Owl Observatory	(Ukraine)	-	Heavenly Owl observatory
L59	Compustar Observatory	(France)	NOR	Compustar Observatory, Rouen
L60	Popovich Observatory	(Ukraine)	-	Popovich Observatory, Ivanivka
L61	MONET South Observatory	(South Africa)	-	MONET South, Sutherland
L62	Hypatia Observatory	(Italy)	-	Hypatia Observatory, Rimini
L63	HOB Observatory, Capraia e Limite	(Italy)	-	HOB Observatory, Capraia Fiorentina
L64	Martesana Observatory, Cassina de' Pecchi	(Italy)	-	Martesana Observatory, Cassina de Pecchi
L65	Bredenkamp Observatory	(Germany)	-	Bredenkamp Observatory, Bremen
L66	MeerLICHT-1 at South African Astronomical Observatory	(South Africa)	-	MeerLICHT-1, Sutherland
L67	Cherkizovo Observatory	(Russia)	-	Cherkizovo Observatory, Moscow Oblast
L68	PESCOPE Observatory	(South Africa)	-	PESCOPE, Port Elizabeth
L69	LaCaille Observatory	(South Africa)	-	LaCaille Observatory, Pretoria
L70	Zvjezdarnica Observatory	(Croatia)	-	Zvjezdarnica Graberje, Zagreb
L71	Vedrus Observatory	(Russia)	Krasnodar	Vedrus Observatory, Azovskaya
L72	Melezhy Astrophoto Observatory	(Russia)	Moscow	Melezhy Astrophoto Observatory
L73	Blessed Hermann Observatory (Osservatorio Beato Ermanno)	(Italy)	Tu	Blessed Hermann Observatory, Impruneta
L74	AstroColauri Observatory	(Italy)	Cam	AstroColauri, Naples
L75	Tartu Observatory of University of Tartu (see 075 for the Tartu Old Observatory)	(Estonia)	-	Tartu Observatory of Tartu University
L76	Nomad Observatory	(Russia)	-	Nomad Observatory, Kochevanchik
L77	RDSS, Kovalevka	(Russia)	-	RDSS, Kovalevka
L78	Marco Observatory	(Italy)	Cam	Marco Observatory, Salerno
L79	BOSZA Observatory	(Hungary)	-	BOSZA Observatory, Szalanta
L80	SpringBok Observatory, Tivoli Astro Farm	(Namibia)	-	SpringBok Observatory, Tivoli
L81	Skygems Namibia Remote Observatory	(Namibia)	-	Skygems Namibia Remote Observatory
L82	Crow Observatory	(Portugal)	-	Crow Observatory, Portalegre
L83	UJA Observatory	(Spain)	Andalusia	UJA Observatory, Jaen
L84	Letnik Observatory	(Russia)	-	Letnik, Rostov Oblast
L85	BiAnto Observatory	(Italy)	Cal	BiAnto Observatory, Lauria
L86	Giordano Bruno Observatory	(Italy)	Lo	Giordano Bruno Observatory, Brallo
L87	Moonbase South Observatory	(Namibia)	-	Moonbase South Observatory, Hakos
L88	Le Pleiadi Station (Stazione Astronomica Le Pleiadi)	(Italy)	Bas	Stazione Astronomica Le Pleiadi, Pantane
L89	PAO Observatory	(Italy)	Tus	PAO, Prato
L90	ABObservatory	(Italy)	Cal	ABObservatory, Rosarno
L91	Antares MTM Observatory, San Donato Val di Comino	(Italy)	Laz	Antares MTM Observatory, S. Donato
L92	San Costantino Observatory, (San Costantino di Briatico)	(Italy)	Cal	Toni Scarmato's Observatory
L93	Garraf Observatory	(Spain)	CT	Garraf Observatory, Sant Pere de Ribes
L94	MOMA Observatory (Observatorio MOMA)	(Spain)	Asturias	Observatorio MOMA, Oviedo
L95	Canteras Observatory	(Spain)	Murcia	Canteras, Murcia
L96	ISON-Byurakan Observatory	(Armenia)	-	ISON-Byurakan Observatory
L97	Castle Fields Observatory	(United Kingdom)	ENG	Castle Fields Observatory, Calne
L98	La Sagra Observatory	(Spain)	Granada	La Sagra Observatory, Puebla de Don Fadrique
L99	Novoselki Observatory	(Ukraine)	-	Novoselki
M01	Weizmann Astrophysical Observatory			
M03	Badalona Boreal Observatory	(Spain)	CL	Badalona Boreal
M10	CPF Observatory, Saint-Vallier-de-Thiey	(France)	-	CPF Observatory, St Vallier de Thiey
M15	Virgo Observatory	(Italy)	Lo	Virgo Observatory, Seveso
M18	Koeditz Observatory	(Germany)	Ba	Koeditz
M20	Polse di Cougnes Observatory	(Italy)	F	Polse di Cougnes Observatory, Zuglio
M22	ATLAS–SAAO	(South Africa)	-	ATLAS South Africa, Sutherland
M28	Lesedi Telescope, South African Astronomical Observatory	(South Africa)	NC	Lesedi Telescope-SAAO Observatory, Sutherland
M33	OWL-Net	(Israel)	-	OWL-Net, Mitzpe Ramon
M42	Emirates Observatory	(United Arab Emirates)	-	Emirates Observatory, Al Rahba
M43	Al Sadeem Observatory	(United Arab Emirates)	-	Al Sadeem Observatory, Abu Dhabi
M44	Al-Khatim Observatory	(United Arab Emirates)	-	Al-Khatim Observatory, Abu Dhabi
M46	Althuraya Astronomy Center	(United Arab Emirates)	-	Althuraya Astronomy Center, Dubai
M47	Sharjah Observatory	(United Arab Emirates)	-	Sharjah Observatory, Sharjah
M68	School 1502 Rooftop Observatory	(Russia)	Moscow	Moscow, Russia
M90	Chervishevo Observatory	(Russia)	-	Chervishevo
N27	Omsk-Yogik Observatory	(Russia)	-	Omsk-Yogik Observatory
N30	Zeds Astronomical Observatory	(Pakistan)	-	Zeds Astronomical Observatory, Lahore
N31	Eden Astronomical Observatory	(Pakistan)	-	Eden Astronomical Observatory, Lahore
N42	Tien-Shan Astronomical Observatory	(Kazakhstan)	-	Tien-Shan Astronomical Observatory
N43	Plateau Observatory for Dome A, at Chinese Kunlun Station	(Antarctica)	–	Plateau Observatory for Dome A, Kunlun Station
N50	Himalayan Chandra Telescope	(India)	-	Himalayan Chandra Telescope, IAO, Hanle
N51	GROWTH India Telescope	(India)	-	GROWTH India Telescope, IAO, Hanle
N55	Corona Borealis Observatory	(China)	-	Corona Borealis Observatory, Ngari
N56	Zijinshan-Beimian Survey, Ngari Prefecture	(China)	-	Zijinshan-Beimian Survey, Ali
N82	Multa Observatory	(Russia)	-	Multa Observatory
N86	Xingming Observatory-KATS	(China)	-	Xingming Observatory-KATS, Nanshan
N87	Nanshan Station of the Xinjiang Observatory	(China)	-	Nanshan Station, Xinjiang Observatory
N88	Xingming Observatory #3, Nanshan	(China)	-	Xingming Observatory #3, Nanshan
N89	Xingming Observatory #2	(China)	-	Xingming Observatory #2, Nanshan
O02	Galaxy Tibet YBJ Observatory	(China)	Tibet	Galaxy Tibet YBJ Observatory, Yangbajing
O37	TRT-NEO Observatory	(Thailand)	-	TRT-NEO, Chiangmai
O42	Gaomeigu Gemini Observatory, LiJiang	(China)	Yunnan	Gemini
O43	Observatori Negara	(Malaysia)	-	Observatori Negara, Langkawi
O44	Lijiang Station, Yunnan Observatories	(China)	-	Lijiang Station, Yunnan Observatories
O45	Yunnan-HK Observatory	(China)	-	Yunnan-HK Observatory, Gaomeigu
O47	Yunling Observatory	(China)	-	Yunling Observatory, Yunnan
O48	Purple Mountain Observatory, Yaoan Station, 0.8-meter	(China)	-	Purple Mountain Observatory, Yaoan (0.8-m)
O49	Yaoan Station of the Purple Mountain Observatory	(China)	-	Purple Mountain Observatory, Yaoan Station
O50	Hin Hua Observatory	(Malaysia)	-	Hin Hua Observatory, Klang
O72	OWL-Net, Songino Khairkhan	(Mongolia)	-	OWL-Net, Songino
O75	ISON-Hureltogoot Observatory	(Mongolia)	-	ISON-Hureltogoot Observatory
O85	LiShan Observatory	(China)	-	LiShan Observatory, Lintong
P18	Birch Forest Observatory, Lǎbāgōumén	(China)	-	Birch Forest Observatory, LaBaGouMen
P25	Kinmen Educational Remote Observatory	(Taiwan)	-	Kinmen Educational Remote Observatory, Jincheng
P30	Jiangnantianchi Observatory, Anji County	(China)	-	Jiangnantianchi Observatory, Anji
P31	Starlight Observatory	(China)	ZJ	Starlight Observatory, Tianhuangping
P34	Lvye Observatory	(China)	-	Lvye Observatory, Suzhou
P35	Cuteip Remote Observatory	(Taiwan)	-	Cuteip Remote Observatory, Changhua
P36	ULTRA Observatory	(China)	-	ULTRA Observatory, Suzhou
P37	HuiWen High School Observatory	(Taiwan)	TWN	HuiWen High School Observatory, Taichung City
P40	Chinese Culture University Observatory	(Taiwan)	-	Chinese Culture University, Taipei
P48	ASTEP Observatory	(Antarctica)	-	ASTEP, Concordia Station
P63	GSA Observatory	(South Korea)	Gwangju	GSA Observatory, Gwangju
P64	GSHS Observatory	(South Korea)	Gyeonggi	GSHS Observatory, Suwon
P65	OWL-Net, Daedeoksan (Samcheok/Taebaek)	(South Korea)	Daejeon	OWL-Net, Daedeok
P66	Deokheung Optical Astronomy Observatory	(South Korea)	South Jeolla	Deokheung Optical Astronomy Observatory
P67	Kangwon National University Observatory	(South Korea)	Gangwon	Kangwon National University Observatory
P68	DDSHS Biryong Observatory	(South Korea)	Daejeon	DDSHS Biryong Observatory
P71	Miryang Arirang Astronomical Observatory	(South Korea)	South Gyeongsang	Miryang Arirang Astronomical Observatory
P72	OWL-Net, Bohyeonsan	(South Korea)	North Gyeongsang	OWL-Net, Mt. Bohyun
P73	BSH Byulsem Observatory	(South Korea)	Busan	BSH Byulsem Observatory, Busan
P87	Hirao Observatory, Yamaguchi Prefecture	(Japan)	-	Hirao Observatory, Yamaguchi
P93	Space Tracking and Communications Center	(Japan)	-	Space Tracking and Communications Center, JAXA
Q02	Sakai Observatory	(Japan)	-	Sakai Observatory, Osaka
Q11	Shinshiro Observatory	(Japan)	23	Shinshiro
Q12	Nagano Observatory (also see #D81)	(Japan)	-	Nagano Observatory
Q19	Machida Observatory	(Japan)	-	Machida
Q21	Southern Utsunomiya Observatory	(Japan)	-	Southern Utsunomiya
Q23	Sukagawa Observatory	(Japan)	-	Sukagawa
Q24	Katori Observatory	(Japan)	-	Katori
Q33	Nayoro Observatory	(Japan)	-	Nayoro Observatory, Hokkaido University
Q38	Lake Boga Observatory (Swan Hill Observatory)	(Australia)	Vic	Swan Hill
Q54	Harlingten Telescope, Greenhill Observatory	(Australia)	TAS	Harlingten Telescope, Greenhill Observatory
Q55	SkyMapper at Siding Spring Observatory	(Australia)	NSW	SkyMapper, Siding Spring
Q56	Heaven's Mirror Observatory	(Australia)	NSW	Heaven's Mirror Observatory, Yass
Q57	Korea Microlensing Telescope Network-SSO	(Australia)	NSW	Korea Microlensing Telescope Network-SSO
Q58	Siding Spring Observatory: LCO Clamshell #1	(Australia)	NSW	Siding Spring-LCO Clamshell #1
Q59	Siding Spring Observatory: LCO Clamshell #2 (Las Cumbres Observatory Global Telescope)	(Australia)	NSW	Siding Spring-LCO Clamshell #2
Q60	Siding Spring Observatory: ISON-SSO Observatory	(Australia)	NSW	ISON-SSO Observatory, Siding Spring
Q61	Siding Spring Observatory: PROMPT	(Australia)	NSW	PROMPT, Siding Spring
Q62	Siding Spring Observatory: iTelescope Observatory	(Australia)	NSW	iTelescope Observatory, Siding Spring
Q63	Siding Spring Observatory: LCO A (Las Cumbres Observatory Global Telescope)	(Australia)	NSW	Siding Spring-LCO A
Q64	Siding Spring Observatory: LCO B (Las Cumbres Observatory Global Telescope)	(Australia)	NSW	Siding Spring-LCO B
Q65	Warrumbungle Observatory	(Australia)	NSW	Warrumbungle Observatory
Q66	Siding Spring Observatory: Janess-G, JAXA	(Australia)	NSW	Siding Spring-Janess-G, JAXA
Q67	JBL Observatory	(Australia)	NSW	JBL Observatory, Bathurst
Q68	Blue Mountains Observatory	(Australia)	NSW	Blue Mountains Observatory, Leura
Q69	Hazelbrook (O'Day)	(Australia)	NSW	Hazelbrook (O'Day)
Q70	Glenlee Observatory Observatory	(Australia)	QLD	Glenlee Observatory, Glenlee
Q78	Woogaroo Observatory, Forest Lake	(Australia)	QLD	Woogaroo Observatory, Forest Lake
Q79	Samford Valley Observatory	(Australia)	Qld	Samford Valley Observatory
Q80	Birkdale Observatory	(Australia)	Qld	Birkdale
Q81	Caloundra West Observatory	(Australia)	Qld	Caloundra West
R17	Teide Observatory, Tenerife	(Spain)	CN	ATLAS-TDO
R57	Aorangi Iti Observatory, also see #474	(New Zealand)	Ca	Aorangi Iti Observatory, Lake Tekapo
R58	Beverly-Begg Observatory	(New Zealand)	Otg	Beverly-Begg Observatory, Dunedin
R65	R. F. Joyce Observatory	(New Zealand)	-	R. F. Joyce Observatory, Christchurch
R66	Mooray Observatory	(New Zealand)	-	Mooray Observatory, Christchurch
R70	WATCH	(France)	-	Beychac Et Caillau
T03	Haleakala-LCO Clamshell #3	(United States)	HI	Haleakala-LCO Clamshell #3
T04	Haleakala-LCO OGG B #2	(United States)	HI	Haleakala-LCO OGG B #2
T05	Asteroid Terrestrial-impact Last Alert System (ATLAS-HKO; at Haleakala Observatory)	(United States)	HI	ATLAS-HKO, Haleakala
T07	ATLAS-MLO Auxiliary Camera	(United States)	-	ATLAS-MLO Auxiliary Camera, Mauna Loa
T08	Asteroid Terrestrial-impact Last Alert System (ATLAS-MLO; at Mauna Loa Observatory)	(United States)	HI	ATLAS-MLO, Mauna Loa
T09	Mauna Kea-UH/Tholen NEO Follow-Up (Subaru)	(United States)	HI	Mauna Kea-UH/Tholen NEO Follow-Up (Subaru)
T10	Submillimeter Array (SMA), Mauna Kea Observatories	(United States)	HI	Submillimeter Array, Mauna Kea (SMA)
T12	Mauna Kea-UH/Tholen NEO Follow-Up (2.24-m)	(United States)	HI	Mauna Kea-UH/Tholen NEO Follow-Up (2.24-m)
T14	Mauna Kea-UH/Tholen NEO Follow-Up (CFHT)	(United States)	HI	Mauna Kea-UH/Tholen NEO Follow-Up (CFHT)
U52	Shasta Valley Observatory	(United States)	CA	Shasta Valley Observatory, Grenada (?)
U53	Murray Hill Observatory	(United States)	OR	Murray Hill Observatory, Beaverton
U54	Hume Observatory	(United States)	CA	Hume Observatory, Santa Rosa
U55	Golden Ears Observatory	(Canada)	BC	Golden Ears Observatory, Maple Ridge
U56	Palo Alto Observatory	(United States)	CA	Palo Alto
U57	Black Mountain Observatory	(United States)	CA	Black Mountain Observatory, Los Altos
U63	Burnt Tree Hill Observatory	(United States)	WA	Burnt Tree Hill Observatory, Cle Elum
U64	Lind Observatory – Central Washington University (CWU)	(United States)	WA	CWU-Lind Observatory, Ellensburg
U65	CWU Observatory	(United States)	WA	CWU Observatory, Ellensburg
U67	Jack C. Davis Observatory	(United States)	NV	Jack C. Davis Observatory, Carson City
U68	JPL SynTrack Robotic Telescope	(United States)	CA	JPL SynTrack Robotic Telescope, Auberry
U69	iTelescope SRO Observatory	(United States)	CA	iTelescope SRO Observatory, Auberry
U70	RASC Observatory	(United States)	CA	RASC Observatory, Alder Springs
U71	AHS Observatory	(United States)	CA	AHS Observatory, Castaic
U72	Tarzana Observatory	(United States)	CA	Tarzana
U73	Redondo Beach	(United States)	CA	Redondo Beach
U74	JPL SynTrack Robotic Telescope 2	(United States)	CA	JPL SynTrack Robotic Telescope 2, Auberry
U76	Maury Lewin Astronomical Observatory; observer: Pablo Lewin	(United States)	CA	Glendora
U77	Rani Observatory	(United States)	CA	Rani Observatory, San Diego
U78	Cedar Glen Observatory	(United States)	CA	Cedar Glen Observatory
U79	Cosmos Research Center	(United States)	CA	Cosmos Research Center, Encinitas
U80	DanHenge Observatory – Center for Solar System Studies (CS3); observer: Daniel Coley	(United States)	CA	CS3-DanHenge Observatory, Landers
U81	Trojan Station – Center for Solar System Studies (CS3); observer: Robert D. Stephens	(United States)	CA	CS3-Trojan Station, Landers
U82	Palmer Divide Station – Center for Solar System Studies (CS3); observer: Brian D. Warner	(United States)	CA	CS3-Palmer Divide Station, Landers
U83	Mount Laguna Observatory, Mount Laguna	(United States)	CA	Mount Laguna Observatory
U96	Athabasca University Geophysical Observatory	(Canada)	AB	Athabasca University Geophysical Observatory
U97	JPL SynTrack Robotic Telescope 3	(United States)	AZ	JPL SynTrack Robotic Telescope 3, Flagstaff
U98	NAC Observatory; observer: Mike Wiles	(United States)	AZ	NAC Observatory, Benson
V00	Bok Telescope at the Kitt Peak National Observatory	(United States)	AZ	Kitt Peak-Bok
V01	Mountainville Observatory	(United States)	UT	Mountainville Observatory, Alpine
V02	Command Module Observatory; observer: Thomas A. Polakis	(United States)	AZ	Command Module, Tempe
V03	Big Water Observatory	(United States)	UT	Big Water
V04	FRoST, Anderson Mesa Station, see #688	(United States)	AZ	FRoST, Anderson Mesa
V05	Rusty Mountain Observatory	(United States)	AZ	Rusty Mountain Observatory, Gold Canyon
V06	Catalina Sky Survey-Kuiper, also see #703	(United States)	AZ	Catalina Sky Survey-Kuiper
V07	Whipple Observatory PAIRITEL (also see #696 and #G91)	(Chile)	-	Whipple Observatory, Mount Hopkins-PAIRITEL
V08	Mountain Creek Ranch	(United States)	AZ	Mountain Creek Ranch, Vail
V09	Moka Observatory	(United States)	AZ	Moka Observatory, Benson
V10	Sierra Sinagua Observatory	(United States)	AZ	Sierra Sinagua Observatory, Flagstaff
V11	Saguaro Observatory	(United States)	AZ	Saguaro Observatory, Tucson
V12	Elgin Observatory	(United States)	AZ	Elgin
V13	Little Moose Observatory	(United States)	UT	Little Moose Observatory, Timber Lakes
V14	Moose Springs Observatory	(United States)	UT	Moose Springs Observatory, Timber Lakes
V15	OWL-Net, Mount Lemmon Observatory	(United States)	AZ	OWL-Net, Mt. Lemmon
V16	Crowson Observatory, Dark Sky New Mexico	(United States)	NM	Dark Sky New Mexico, Animas
V17	Leo Observatory	(United States)	AZ	Leo Observatory, Tucson
V19	Whiskey Creek Observatory	(United States)	NM	Whiskey Creek Observatory
V20	Killer Rocks Observatory	(United States)	NM	Killer Rocks Observatory, Pie Town
V21	Cewanee Observatory at DSNM	(United States)	NM	Cewanee Observatory at DSNM
V23	FOAH Observatory	(United States)	NM	FOAH Observatory, Magdalena
V24	Sonoran Desert Skies Observatory, observer: Alex Helms	(United States)	AZ	Sonoran Desert Skies Observatory, Pearce
V26	UAS-ISON Observatory, Cosala	(Mexico)	-	UAS-ISON Observatory, Cosalá
V27	North Mesa Observatory	(United States)	NM	North Mesa Observatory, Los Alamos
V28	Deep Sky West Observatory	(United States)	NM	Deep Sky West Observatory, Rowe
V29	Cloudcroft Observatory (Tzec Maun Cloudcroft Facility located at Cloudcroft; also see Mayhill location: #H10)	(United States)	NM	Tzec Maun Cloudcroft Facility
V30	Heaven on Earth Observatory	(United States)	NM	Heaven on Earth Observatory, Mayhill
V31	Hazardous Observatory	(United States)	NM	Hazardous Observatory, Mayhill
V32	Canvas View New Mexico Skies, (at Mayhill location)	(United States)	NM	Canvas View New Mexico Skies, Mayhill
V34	Black Forest Observatory	(United States)	CO	Black Forest
V35	Deep Sky Observatory	(United States)	TX	Deep Sky Observatory Collaborative, Pier 5
V36	The Ranch Observatory, Artesia	(United States)	NM	The Ranch Observatory, Lakewood
V37	McDonald Observatory-LCO ELP, also see #711	(United States)	TX	McDonald Observatory-LCO ELP
V38	McDonald Observatory-LCO ELP Aqawan A #1, also see #711	(United States)	TX	McDonald Observatory-LCO ELP Aqawan A #1
V39	McDonald Observatory-LCO ELP B	(United States)	TX	McDonald Observatory-LCO ELP B
V40	Dark Sky Observatory	(United States)	TX	Dark Sky Observatory, Fort Davis
V41	Rapid City Observatory	(United States)	SD	Rapid City
V42	Dimension Point Observatory	(United States)	NM	Dimension Point, Mayhill
V58	Medina Dome Observatory	(United States)	TX	Medina Dome, Medina
V59	Millwood Observatory	(United States)	TX	Millwood Observatory, Comfort
V60	Putnam Mountain Observatory	(United States)	TX	Putman Mountain Observatory
V61	Shed of Science South Observatory	(United States)	TX	Shed of Science South, Pontotoc
V62	Live Oak Observatory	(United States)	TX	Live Oak Observatory, Pontotoc
V63	Tara Observatory	(United States)	TX	Tara Observatory, Cherokee
V70	Starry Night Observatory	(United States)	TX	Starry Night Observatory, Columbus
V72	Omaha Observatory	(United States)	NE	Omaha
V74	Katy Observatory	(United States)	TX	Katy Observatory, Katy
V78	Spirit Marsh Observatory	(United States)	MN	Spirit Marsh Observatory. Sauk Centre
V81	Fayetteville Observatory	(United States)	NC	Fayetteville
V83	Rolling Hills Observatory	(United States)	MO	Rolling Hills Observatory, Warrensburg
V86	Rattle Snake Observatory	(United States)	MO	Rattle Snake Observatory, Sedalia
V88	River Ridge Observatory	(United States)	AR	River Ridge Observatory, Conway
V93	Pin Oak Observatory, Fort Madison	(United States)	IA	Pin Oak Observatory, Fort Madison
V94	Cherokeeridge Observatory	(United States)	IA	Cherokeeridge Observatory, Fort Madison
W04	Mark Evans Observatory	(United States)	IL	Mark Evans Observatory, Bloomington
W08	Jimginny Observatory	(United States)	IL	Jimginny Observatory, Naperville
W11	Calumet Astronomy Center	(United States)	IN	Northwest Indiana Robotic Telescope, Lowell
W14	Harvest Observatory	(United States)	AL	Harvest
W16	Pleasant Groves Observatory	(United States)	AL	Pleasant Groves Observatory
W19	Kalamazoo Observatory	(United States)	MI	Kalamazoo
W23	Hevonen Farm Observatory	(United States)	OH	Hevonen Farm Observatory, Oxford
W22	WestRock Observatory	(United States)	GA	WestRock Observatory, Columbus
W25	RMS Observatory	(United States)	OH	RMS Observatory, Cincinnati
W28	Ex Nihilo Observatory	(United States)	GA	Ex Nihilo Observatory, Winder
W30	Georgia College Observatory	(United States)	GA	Georgia College Observatory, Milledgeville
W31	Deerlick Observatory	(United States)	GA	Deerlick Observatory, Crawfordville
W32	Crawfordville Observatory	(United States)	GA	Crawfordville Observatory
W33	Transit Dreams Observatory	(United States)	SC	Transit Dreams Observatory, Campobello
W34	Squirrel Valley Observatory	(United States)	NC	Squirrel Valley Observatory, Columbus
W42	Mind's Eye Observatory	(United States)	FL	St Sebastian Preserve Sebastian, Florida Sebastian
W38	Dark Sky Observatory	(United States)	NC	Dark Sky Observatory, Boone
W46	Foxfire Village Observatory, Foxfire	(United States)	NC	Foxfire Village
W49	CBA-MM Observatory	(United States)	WV	CBA-MM Observatory, Mountain Meadows
W50	Apex	(United States)	NC	Apex
W53	Hagerstown Observatory	(United States)	MD	Hagerstown
W54	Mark Slade Remote Observatory	(United States)	VA	Mark Slade Remote Observatory, Wilderness
W55	Natelli Observatory	(United States)	MD	Natelli Observatory, Frederick
W61	Leeside Observatory	(Canada)	ON	Leeside Observatory, Elgin
W62	Comet Hunter Observatory 2	(United States)	PA	Comet Hunter Observatory2, New Ringgold
W63	Astronomical Observatory Technological University Of Pereira (Observatorio Astronómico De la Universidad Tecnológica De Pereira)	(Colombia)	Risaralda	Observatorio Astronomico UTP, Pereira
W65	GOZ Observatory (Observatoire GOZ), Montpellier	(Canada)	QBC	Observatoire GOZ, Montpellier
W66	SVH Observatory	(United States)	NJ	SVH Observatory, Blairstown
W67	Paul Robinson Observatory	(United States)	NJ	Paul Robinson Observatory, Voorhees State Park
W68	ATLAS-CHL	(Chile)	IV	El Sauce Observatory, Rio Hurtado
W70	Loose Goose Observatory	(Canada)	QC	Loose Goose Observatory, Saint-Jérôme
W71	Rand II Observatory	(United States)	NY	Rand II Observatory, Lake Placid
W72	Trumbull Observatory	(United States)	CT	Trumbull Observatory, Trumbull
W73	Moquegua Observatory (Observatorio Astronomico de Moquegua)	(Peru)	-	Observatorio Astronomico de Moquegua, Carumas
W74	Danish National Telescope, ESO-La Silla Observatory	(Chile)	-	Danish Telescope, La Silla
W75	SPECULOOS-South Observatory, Paranal	(Chile)	Af	SPECULOOS-South Observatory, Paranal
W76	CHILESCOPE Observatory, Río Hurtado	(Chile)	Co	CHILESCOPE Observatory, Rio Hurtad
W77	Skyledge Observatory	(United States)	CT	Skyledge Observatory, Killingworth
W78	Clay Telescope	(United States)	MA	Clay Telescope, Harvard University
W79	Cerro Tololo-LCO Aqawan B #1, see #807	(Chile)	Co	Cerro Tololo-LCO Aqawan B #1
W80	Westwood Observatory	(United States)	MA	Westwood
W81	Nebula Knoll Observatory	(United States)	NH	Nebula Knoll Observatory, East Wakefield
W82	Mendel Observatory	(United States)	MA	Mendel Observatory, Merrimack College
W83	Whitin Observatory	(United States)	MA	Whitin Observatory, Wellesley
W84	Cerro Tololo-Dark Energy Camera (DECam) of The Dark Energy Survey, also see #807	(Chile)	Co	Cerro Tololo-DECam
W85	Cerro Tololo-LCO A, at #807	(Chile)	Co	Cerro Tololo-LCO A
W86	Cerro Tololo-LCO B, at #807	(Chile)	Co	Cerro Tololo-LCO B
W87	Cerro Tololo-LCO C, at #807	(Chile)	Co	Cerro Tololo-LCO C
W88	Slooh (Slooh.com)	(Chile)	Co	Slooh.com Chile Observatory, La Dehesa
W89	Cerro Tololo-LCO Aqawan A #1, at #807	(Chile)	Co	Cerro Tololo-LCO Aqawan A #1
W90	Phillips Exeter Academy Grainger Observatory	(United States)	NH	Phillips Exeter Academy Grainger Observatory
W91	VHS-VISTA, Cerro Paranal	(Chile)	-	VHS-VISTA, Cerro Paranal
W92	MASTER-OAFA Observatory	(Argentina)	J	MASTER-OAFA Observatory, San Juan
W93	Korea Microlensing Telescope Network-CTIO	(Chile)	Af	Korea Microlensing Telescope Network-CTIO
W94	MAPS, San Pedro de Atacama	(Chile)	Af	S.P.A.C.E. observatory, San Pedro de Atacama
W95	Panamanian Observatory (Observatorio Panameño en San Pedro de Atacama)	(Chile)	Af	Observatorio Panameno, San Pedro de Atacama
W96	CAO (since 2013)	(Chile)	Af	CAO, San Pedro de Atacama (since 2013)
W97	Atacama Desert Observatory	(Chile)	Af	Atacama Desert Observatory, San Pedro de Atacama
W98	Polonia Observatory	(Chile)	Af	Polonia Observatory, San Pedro de Atacama
W99	Atacama Desert Observatory	(Chile)	Af	SON, San Pedro de Atacama Station
X00	Tolar Observatory (Observatorio Astronomico Tolar)	(Argentina)	-	Observatorio Astronomico Tolar
X01	Hurtado Observatory	(Chile)	-	Observatory Hurtado,
X02	Telescope Live Observatory	(Chile)	-	Telescope Live, El Sauce
X03	SADR Observatory (Observatoire SADR)	(Chile)	-	Observatoire SADR, Poroto
X04	MCD Observatory, Saint-Anaclet	(Canada)	QC	-
X05	Simonyi Survey Telescope, Vera C. Rubin Observatory	(Chile)	-	Vera C. Rubin Observatory
X09	Deep Random Survey	(Chile)	IV	Deep Random Survey, Rio Hurtado
X12	Los Cabezones Observatory (Observatorio Los Cabezones)	(Argentina)	-	Observatorio Los Cabezones
X13	Bosque Alegre Observatory (Observatorio Remoto Bosque Alegre; Estación Astrofísica de Bosque Alegre, Observatorio Astronómico de Córdoba)	(Argentina)	Cór	Observatorio Remoto Bosque Alegre
X14	Orbis Tertius Observatory (Observatorio Orbis Tertius)	(Argentina)	Cór	Observatorio Orbis Tertius, Córdoba
X16	Astronomía Sigma Octante	-	Bo	Cochabamba
X31	Galileo Galilei Observatory (Oro Verde Observatory; Observatorio Astronómico de Oro Verde)	(Argentina)	E	Galileo Galilei Observatory, Oro Verde
X38	Pueyrredon Observatory (Observatorio Pueyrredon)	(Argentina)	BA	Observatorio Pueyrredon, La Lonja
X39	Antares Observatory (Observatorio Antares), also see U.S. observatory #H55	(Argentina)	BA	Observatorio Antares, Pilar
X50	Montevideo Astronomical Observatory (Observatorio Astronomico de Montevideo)	(Uruguay)	-	Observatorio Astronomico de Montevideo
X57	CMF Observatory (Polo Astronômico Casimiro Montenegro Filho) and planetarium	(Brazil)	PR	Polo Astronomico CMF, Foz do Iguaçu
X70	OATU Observatory (Observatorio OATU)	(Brazil)	SP	Observatorio OATU, Tupi Paulista
X77	Centro Astronomico Nevoeiro - Antonio Olinto	(Brazil)	PR	Centro Astronomico Nevoeiro - Antonio Olinto
X74	Campo dos Amarais Observatory	(Brazil)	SP	Observatorio Campo dos Amarais
X87	Dogsheaven Observatory	(Brazil)	DF	Dogsheaven Observatory, Brasília
X88	Adhara Observatory (Observatório Adhara)	(Brazil)	SP	Observatorio Adhara, Sorocaba
X89	Rocca Observatory	(Brazil)	DF	Rocca Observatory, Brasília
X90	Carina Observatory	(Brazil)	DF	Carina Observatory, Brasília
Y00	SONEAR Observatory (SONEAR Observatory), Southern Observatory for Near Earth Asteroids Research	(Brazil)	MG	SONEAR Observatory, Oliveira
Y16	ROCG Observatory	(Brazil)	-	ROCG, Campos dos Goytacazes
Y28	OASI Observatory, Itacuruba	(Brazil)	PE	OASI, Nova Itacuruba
Y40	Discovery Observatory	(Brazil)	-	Discovery Observatory, Caruaru
Y64	Transient Survey Telescope, TST, Tenerife	(Spain)	CN	Transient Survey Telescope, TST, Teide
Y65	Two-meter Twin Telescope, TTT1, Tenerife	(Spain)	CN	Two-meter Twin Telescope, TTT1, Teide
Y66	Two-meter Twin Telescope, TTT2, Tenerife	(Spain)	CN	Two-meter Twin Telescope, TTT2, Teide
Y68	Two-meter Twin Telescope, TTT3, Tenerife	(Spain)	CN	Two-meter Twin Telescope, TTT3, Teide
Z02	HAO observatory (at Oukaïmeden Observatory)	(Morocco)	-	HAO observatory, Oukaimeden
Z03	Rio Cofio Observatory	(Spain)	MD	Rio Cofio, Robledo de Chavela
Z05	Horus Observatory (Observatorio Horus)	(Spain)	-	Observatorio Horus, Cártama
Z06	Marina Sky Observatory	(Spain)	Cas	Marina Sky, Nerpio
Z07	Ad Astra Sangos Observatory	(Spain)	AN	Ad Astra Sangos Observatory, Alhendin
Z08	Telescope Live	(Spain)	AN	Telescope Live, Oria
Z09	Old Orchard Observatory	(United Kingdom)	ENG	Old Orchard Observatory, Fiddington
Z10	PGC Observatory, Fregenal de la Sierra	(Spain)	Ext	PGC, Fregenal de la Sierra
Z11	Appledorne Observatory	(United Kingdom)	ENG	Appledorne Observatory, Farnsfield
Z12	La Romaneta Observatory, Monòver	(Spain)	Val	La Romaneta, Monovar
Z13	AGP GUAM 4 Observatory (Observatorio AGP GUAM 4), Málaga	(Spain)	-	Observatorio AGP GUAM 4, Malaga
Z14	ART Observatory	(Spain)	Ext	ART, Fregenal de la Sierra
Z15	Southwater Observatory	(United Kingdom)	ENG	Southwater
Z16	Cartagena Astronomical Association Observatory (Asociacion Astronomica de Cartagena)	(Spain)	Murcia	Asociacion Astronomica de Cartagena
Z17	Tenerife-LCO Aqawan A #2	(Spain)	CN	Tenerife-LCO Aqawan A #2
Z18	Gran Telescopio Canarias (GranTeCan or GTC; Great Canary Telescope), at Roque de los Muchachos Observatory	(Spain)	CN	Gran Telescopio Canarias, Roque de los Muchachos
Z19	Galileo National Telescope (Telescopio Nazionale Galileo; TNG)	(Spain)	CN	La Palma-TNG
Z20	Mercator Telescope	(Spain)	CN	La Palma-MERCATOR
Z21	Tenerife-LCO Aqawan A #1	(Spain)	CN	Tenerife-LCO Aqawan A #1
Z22	MASTER-IAC Observatory	(Spain)	CN	MASTER-IAC Observatory, Tenerife
Z23	Nordic Optical Telescope at Roque de los Muchachos Observatory	(Spain)	Can	Nordic Optical Telescope, La Palma
Z24	Tenerife Observatory-LCO B	(Spain)	CN	Tenerife Observatory-LCO B, Tenerife
Z25	Artemis Observatory	(Spain)	Canary Islands	Artemis Observatory, Teide
Z26	Arcangel Observatory (Observatorio Astronomico Arcangel)	(Spain)	-	Observatorio Astronomico Arcangel, Las Zocas
Z27	Coralito Observatory (Observatorio Coralito)	(Spain)	-	Observatorio Coralito, La Laguna
Z28	Northern Skygems Observatory	(Spain)	CLM	Northern Skygems Observatory, Nerpio
Z29	Sobradillo Observatory	(Spain)	CL	Observatorio Astronomico Sobradillo
Z30	Glyn Marsh Observatory	(United Kingdom)	IM	Glyn Marsh Observatory, Douglas
Z31	Tenerife Observatory-LCO A	(Spain)	CN	Tenerife Observatory-LCO A, Tenerife
Z32	Javalambre Observatory, Gúdar-Javalambre	(Spain)	-	Observatorio Astrofisico de Javalambre
Z33	6ROADS Observatory 2	(Spain)	CM	6ROADS Observatory 2, Nerpio
Z34	NNHS Drummonds Observatory	(United Kingdom)	ENG	NNHS Drummonds Observatory
Z35	OAO Astronomical Observatory of the University of Valencia at Aras de los Olmos	(Spain)	V	OAO Astronomical Observatory of the University of Valencia
Z36	Cancelada Observatory	(Spain)	AN	Cancelada
Z37	Northolt Branch Observatory 3	(United Kingdom)	ENG	Northolt Branch Observatory 3, Blandford Forum
Z38	Picoto Observatory	(Portugal)	-	Picoto Observatory, Leiria
Z39	Costa Teguise Observatory (Observatorio Costa Teguise)	(Spain)	-	Observatorio Costa Teguise
Z40	El Manzanillo Observatory	(Spain)	AN	El Manzanillo Observatory, Puerto de la Torre
Z41	Irydeo Observatory	(Spain)	MD	Irydeo Observatory, Camarma de Esteruelas
Z42	Rushay Farm Observatory	(United Kingdom)	ENG	Rushay Farm Observatory, Sturminster Newton
Z43	Landéhen Observatory	(France)	Brittany	Landéhen
Z44	Terminus Observatory (Observatorio Terminus)	(Spain)	GA	Observatorio Terminus, A Coruña
Z45	Cosmos Observatory	(Spain)	AN	Cosmos Observatory, Marbella
Z46	Cardiff Observatory	(United Kingdom)	WLS	Cardiff
Z47	Runcorn Observatory	(United Kingdom)	ENG	Runcorn
Z48	Northolt Branch Observatory 2	(United Kingdom)	ENG	Northolt Branch Observatory 2, Shepherd's Bush
Z49	Alston Observatory, Longridge	(United Kingdom)	ENG	Alston Observatory
Z50	Mazariegos Observatory	(Spain)	CL	Mazariegos
Z51	Anunaki Observatory	(Spain)	MD	Anunaki Observatory, Rivas-Vaciamadrid
Z52	The Studios Observatory	(United Kingdom)	ENG	The Studios Observatory, Grantham
Z53	TRAPPIST–North, at Oukaïmden Observatory (#J43)	(Morocco)	-	TRAPPIST-North, Oukaïmeden
Z54	Greenmoor Observatory	(United Kingdom)	ENG	Greenmoor Observatory, Woodcote
Z55	Uraniborg Observatory, Ecija Sevilla	(Spain)	-	Uraniborg Observatory, Ecija
Z56	Knocknaboola Observatory	(Republic of Ireland)	-	Knocknaboola
Z57	Zuben Observatory (Observatorio Zuben)	(Spain)	-	Observatorio Zuben, Alhaurín de la Torre
Z58	ESA Cebreros TBT Observatory	(Spain)	-	ESA Cebreros TBT Observatory, Cebreros
Z59	Chelford Observatory	(United Kingdom)	-	Chelford Observatory
Z60	Zaldibia Observatory (Observatorio Zaldibia)	(Spain)	-	Observatorio Zaldibia
Z61	Montecanal Observatory	(Spain)	-	Montecanal Observatory, Zaragoza
Z62	Forcarei Observatory (Observatorio Forcarei)	(Spain)	-	Observatorio Forcarei
Z63	Skybor Observatory	(Spain)	-	Skybor Observatory, Borja
Z64	Miron del Cielo Observatory (Observatorio el Miron del Cielo)	(Spain)	-	Observatorio el Miron del Cielo
Z65	Corgas Observatory (Observatorio Astronómico Corgas)	(Spain)	GA	Observatorio Astronomico Corgas
Z66	Deimos Sky Survey (DeSS)	(Spain)	CM	DeSS Deimos Sky Survey, Niefla Mountain
Z67	Dunboyne Castle Observatory	(Republic of Ireland)	-	Dunboyne Castle Observatory
Z68	Torreáguila Observatory (Observatorio Torreáguila)	(Spain)	Extremadura	Observatorio Torreaguila, Barbaño
Z69	Mazagon Observatory (Observatorio Mazagón Huelva; Observatorio Mazagón)	(Spain)	AN	Observatorio Mazagón Huelva
Z70	Ponferrada Observatory	(Spain)	CL	Ponferrada
Z71	Observatorio Norba Caesarina, Cáceres	(Spain)	-	Observatorio Norba Caesarina, Aldea Moret
Z72	Cademuir Observatory	(Republic of Ireland)	-	Cademuir Observatory, Dalkey
Z73	Nuevos Horizontes Observatory (Observatorio Nuevos Horizontes)	(Spain)	-	Observatorio Nuevos Horizontes, Camas
Z74	Amanecer de Arrakis Observatory, observer: Francisco Soldán	(Spain)	AN	Amanecer de Arrakis
Z75	Sirius Observatory (Observatorio Sirius)	(Spain)	-	Observatorio Sirius, Las Lomas
Z76	Carda Observatory (Observatorio Carda)	(Spain)	Asturias	Observatorio Carda, Villaviciosa
Z77	Osuna Observatory	(Spain)	AN	Osuna
Z78	Arroyo Observatory	(Spain)	-	Arroyo Observatory, Arroyo Hurtado
Z79	Calar Alto TNO Survey, at #493	(Spain)	AN	Calar Alto TNO Survey
Z80	Northolt Branch Observatory	(United Kingdom)	ENG	Northolt Branch Observatory
Z81	Estrella de Mar Observatory (Observatorio Estrella de Mar)	(Spain)	-	Observatorio Estrella de Mar
Z82	BOOTES-2 Observatory	(Spain)	-	BOOTES-2 Observatory, Algarrobo
Z83	Chicharronian 3C Observatory	(Spain)	MD	Chicharronian 3C Observatory, Tres Cantos
Z84	Calar Alto-Schmidt (see also #493)	(Spain)	AN	Calar Alto-Schmidt
Z85	Sierra Contraviesa Observatory (Observatorio Sierra Contraviesa)	(Spain)	-	Observatorio Sierra Contraviesa
Z86	St. Mellons Observatory	(United Kingdom)	WLS	St. Mellons
Z87	Stanley Laver Observatory	(United Kingdom)	ENG	Stanley Laver Observatory, Pontesbury
Z88	Fosseway Observatory	(United Kingdom)	ENG	Fosseway Observatory, Stratton-on-the-Fosse
Z89	Macclesfield Observatory	(United Kingdom)	ENG	Macclesfield
Z90	Albox Observatory	(Spain)	AN	Albox
Z91	Curdridge Observatory	(United Kingdom)	ENG	Curdridge
Z92	West Park Observatory	(United Kingdom)	ENG	West Park Observatory, Leeds
Z93	Observatorio Polop	(Spain)	V	Observatorio Polop, Alicante
Z94	Kempshott Observatory	(United Kingdom)	ENG	Kempshott
Z95	Astronomía Para Todos Remote Observatory	(Spain)	-	Astronomia Para Todos Remote Observatory
Z96	Cesaraugusto Observatory (Observatorio Cesaraugusto)	(Spain)	-	Observatorio Cesaraugusto
Z97	OPERA Observatory (Observatoire OPERA)	(France)	-	OPERA Observatory, Saint Palais
Z98	TRZ Observatory (Observatorio TRZ)	(Spain)	V	Observatorio TRZ, Bétera
Z99	Clixby Observatory	(United Kingdom)	ENG	Clixby Observatory, Cleethorpes
