= Oksanen =

Oksanen is a Finnish surname. Notable people with the surname include:

- Arto Oksanen (21st century), Finnish amateur astronomer
- Eino Oksanen (1931–2022), Finnish marathon runner
- Kaarlo Oksanen (1909–1941), Finnish footballer
- Shannon Oksanen (born 1967), Canadian artist, musician
- Sofi Oksanen (born 1977), Estonian-Finnish novelist and playwright
- Ville Oksanen (born 1987), Finnish footballer
- Lasse Oksanen (born 1942), Finnish ice hockey player
