= List of minor planets: 103001–104000 =

The following is a partial list of minor planets, running from minor-planet number 103001 through 104000, inclusive. The primary data for this and other partial lists is based on JPL's "Small-Body Orbital Elements" and data available from the Minor Planet Center. Critical list information is also provided by the MPC, unless otherwise specified from Lowell Observatory. A detailed description of the table's columns and additional sources are given on the main page including a complete list of every page in this series, and a statistical break-up on the dynamical classification of minor planets.

Also see the summary list of all named bodies in numerical and alphabetical order, and the corresponding naming citations for the number range of this particular list. New namings may only be added to this list after official publication, as the preannouncement of names is condemned by the Working Group for Small Bodies Nomenclature of the International Astronomical Union.

Near-Earth obj.	MBA (inner)	MBA (outer)	Centaur
Mars-crosser	MBA (middle)	Jupiter trojan	Trans-Neptunian obj.
Unclassified

== 103001–103100 ==
Designation			Discovery			Properties		Ref
Permanent	Provisional	Named after	Date	Site	Discoverer(s)	Category	Diam.	Ref
103001	1999 XW_{95}	—	December 9, 1999	Oizumi	T. Kobayashi	·	5.0 km	MPC · JPL
103002	1999 XH_{98}	—	December 7, 1999	Socorro	LINEAR	·	4.0 km	MPC · JPL
103003	1999 XN_{98}	—	December 7, 1999	Socorro	LINEAR	·	2.5 km	MPC · JPL
103004	1999 XR_{98}	—	December 7, 1999	Socorro	LINEAR	·	4.5 km	MPC · JPL
103005	1999 XN_{99}	—	December 7, 1999	Socorro	LINEAR	·	1.7 km	MPC · JPL
103006	1999 XW_{99}	—	December 7, 1999	Socorro	LINEAR	·	4.1 km	MPC · JPL
103007	1999 XD_{100}	—	December 7, 1999	Socorro	LINEAR	GEF	2.5 km	MPC · JPL
103008	1999 XX_{100}	—	December 7, 1999	Socorro	LINEAR	·	2.7 km	MPC · JPL
103009	1999 XW_{101}	—	December 7, 1999	Socorro	LINEAR	·	5.1 km	MPC · JPL
103010	1999 XQ_{102}	—	December 7, 1999	Socorro	LINEAR	·	1.7 km	MPC · JPL
103011	1999 XG_{103}	—	December 7, 1999	Socorro	LINEAR	·	1.4 km	MPC · JPL
103012	1999 XT_{103}	—	December 7, 1999	Socorro	LINEAR	THM	4.5 km	MPC · JPL
103013	1999 XV_{103}	—	December 7, 1999	Socorro	LINEAR	·	1.6 km	MPC · JPL
103014	1999 XD_{104}	—	December 9, 1999	Gekko	T. Kagawa	·	4.6 km	MPC · JPL
103015 Gianfrancomarcon	1999 XF_{104}	Gianfrancomarcon	December 8, 1999	Campo Catino	M. Di Sora, F. Mallìa	·	2.3 km	MPC · JPL
103016 Davidčástek	1999 XH_{105}	Davidčástek	December 8, 1999	Ondřejov	P. Pravec, P. Kušnirák	·	3.5 km	MPC · JPL
103017	1999 XR_{105}	—	December 11, 1999	Oaxaca	Roe, J. M.	EUN	2.7 km	MPC · JPL
103018	1999 XW_{105}	—	December 11, 1999	Oizumi	T. Kobayashi	·	2.0 km	MPC · JPL
103019	1999 XG_{106}	—	December 11, 1999	Prescott	P. G. Comba	·	5.0 km	MPC · JPL
103020	1999 XP_{106}	—	December 4, 1999	Catalina	CSS	·	2.5 km	MPC · JPL
103021	1999 XM_{109}	—	December 4, 1999	Catalina	CSS	·	2.4 km	MPC · JPL
103022	1999 XU_{109}	—	December 4, 1999	Catalina	CSS	·	3.2 km	MPC · JPL
103023	1999 XD_{110}	—	December 4, 1999	Catalina	CSS	NYS	1.8 km	MPC · JPL
103024	1999 XG_{110}	—	December 4, 1999	Catalina	CSS	V	1.4 km	MPC · JPL
103025	1999 XQ_{110}	—	December 5, 1999	Catalina	CSS	·	3.2 km	MPC · JPL
103026	1999 XN_{111}	—	December 8, 1999	Catalina	CSS	·	3.5 km	MPC · JPL
103027	1999 XS_{112}	—	December 11, 1999	Socorro	LINEAR	CYB	10 km	MPC · JPL
103028	1999 XJ_{114}	—	December 11, 1999	Socorro	LINEAR	·	3.7 km	MPC · JPL
103029	1999 XL_{114}	—	December 11, 1999	Socorro	LINEAR	·	4.4 km	MPC · JPL
103030	1999 XH_{115}	—	December 4, 1999	Catalina	CSS	·	4.8 km	MPC · JPL
103031	1999 XN_{115}	—	December 4, 1999	Catalina	CSS	·	2.3 km	MPC · JPL
103032	1999 XJ_{116}	—	December 5, 1999	Catalina	CSS	·	3.2 km	MPC · JPL
103033	1999 XP_{116}	—	December 5, 1999	Catalina	CSS	(5)	2.7 km	MPC · JPL
103034	1999 XD_{117}	—	December 5, 1999	Catalina	CSS	·	2.5 km	MPC · JPL
103035	1999 XY_{117}	—	December 5, 1999	Catalina	CSS	·	1.5 km	MPC · JPL
103036	1999 XP_{118}	—	December 5, 1999	Catalina	CSS	NYS	1.6 km	MPC · JPL
103037	1999 XK_{119}	—	December 5, 1999	Catalina	CSS	·	3.0 km	MPC · JPL
103038	1999 XR_{119}	—	December 5, 1999	Catalina	CSS	·	3.4 km	MPC · JPL
103039	1999 XB_{121}	—	December 5, 1999	Catalina	CSS	V	1.6 km	MPC · JPL
103040	1999 XH_{121}	—	December 5, 1999	Catalina	CSS	·	3.7 km	MPC · JPL
103041	1999 XN_{121}	—	December 5, 1999	Catalina	CSS	·	4.2 km	MPC · JPL
103042	1999 XO_{122}	—	December 7, 1999	Catalina	CSS	·	2.2 km	MPC · JPL
103043	1999 XP_{122}	—	December 7, 1999	Catalina	CSS	V	1.8 km	MPC · JPL
103044	1999 XH_{123}	—	December 7, 1999	Catalina	CSS	·	3.3 km	MPC · JPL
103045	1999 XH_{128}	—	December 7, 1999	Socorro	LINEAR	NYS	1.9 km	MPC · JPL
103046	1999 XU_{128}	—	December 12, 1999	Socorro	LINEAR	·	2.7 km	MPC · JPL
103047	1999 XV_{128}	—	December 12, 1999	Socorro	LINEAR	·	6.6 km	MPC · JPL
103048	1999 XW_{128}	—	December 12, 1999	Socorro	LINEAR	slow	2.0 km	MPC · JPL
103049	1999 XF_{129}	—	December 12, 1999	Socorro	LINEAR	·	3.1 km	MPC · JPL
103050	1999 XV_{129}	—	December 12, 1999	Socorro	LINEAR	EUN	2.8 km	MPC · JPL
103051	1999 XD_{130}	—	December 12, 1999	Socorro	LINEAR	·	1.3 km	MPC · JPL
103052	1999 XT_{131}	—	December 12, 1999	Socorro	LINEAR	·	5.0 km	MPC · JPL
103053	1999 XH_{134}	—	December 12, 1999	Socorro	LINEAR	·	2.4 km	MPC · JPL
103054	1999 XL_{134}	—	December 12, 1999	Socorro	LINEAR	ADE	5.9 km	MPC · JPL
103055	1999 XR_{134}	—	December 5, 1999	Socorro	LINEAR	HNS	2.9 km	MPC · JPL
103056	1999 XX_{134}	—	December 5, 1999	Socorro	LINEAR	BAR	2.9 km	MPC · JPL
103057	1999 XN_{135}	—	December 8, 1999	Socorro	LINEAR	·	1.3 km	MPC · JPL
103058	1999 XQ_{135}	—	December 8, 1999	Socorro	LINEAR	·	1.6 km	MPC · JPL
103059	1999 XV_{136}	—	December 14, 1999	Fountain Hills	C. W. Juels	·	4.7 km	MPC · JPL
103060	1999 XD_{137}	—	December 5, 1999	Anderson Mesa	LONEOS	PHO	4.4 km	MPC · JPL
103061	1999 XZ_{138}	—	December 5, 1999	Kitt Peak	Spacewatch	·	2.9 km	MPC · JPL
103062	1999 XU_{139}	—	December 2, 1999	Kitt Peak	Spacewatch	·	2.2 km	MPC · JPL
103063	1999 XL_{140}	—	December 2, 1999	Kitt Peak	Spacewatch	·	1.9 km	MPC · JPL
103064	1999 XF_{141}	—	December 3, 1999	Kitt Peak	Spacewatch	·	1.2 km	MPC · JPL
103065	1999 XH_{141}	—	December 4, 1999	Kitt Peak	Spacewatch	·	1.8 km	MPC · JPL
103066	1999 XO_{141}	—	December 15, 1999	Kitt Peak	Spacewatch	·	800 m	MPC · JPL
103067	1999 XA_{143}	—	December 14, 1999	Socorro	LINEAR	APO +1km · PHA	1.3 km	MPC · JPL
103068	1999 XD_{145}	—	December 7, 1999	Kitt Peak	Spacewatch	·	2.0 km	MPC · JPL
103069	1999 XN_{145}	—	December 7, 1999	Kitt Peak	Spacewatch	·	2.2 km	MPC · JPL
103070	1999 XC_{148}	—	December 7, 1999	Kitt Peak	Spacewatch	·	2.3 km	MPC · JPL
103071	1999 XU_{150}	—	December 8, 1999	Kitt Peak	Spacewatch	·	1.9 km	MPC · JPL
103072	1999 XJ_{151}	—	December 13, 1999	Anderson Mesa	LONEOS	·	3.2 km	MPC · JPL
103073	1999 XO_{151}	—	December 7, 1999	Kitt Peak	Spacewatch	·	2.5 km	MPC · JPL
103074	1999 XZ_{151}	—	December 7, 1999	Kitt Peak	Spacewatch	·	1.8 km	MPC · JPL
103075	1999 XC_{152}	—	December 8, 1999	Kitt Peak	Spacewatch	DOR	3.3 km	MPC · JPL
103076	1999 XM_{152}	—	December 13, 1999	Anderson Mesa	LONEOS	·	10 km	MPC · JPL
103077	1999 XA_{153}	—	December 7, 1999	Socorro	LINEAR	·	1.9 km	MPC · JPL
103078	1999 XX_{153}	—	December 8, 1999	Socorro	LINEAR	·	2.1 km	MPC · JPL
103079	1999 XS_{157}	—	December 8, 1999	Socorro	LINEAR	·	2.8 km	MPC · JPL
103080	1999 XG_{158}	—	December 8, 1999	Socorro	LINEAR	·	3.0 km	MPC · JPL
103081	1999 XQ_{158}	—	December 8, 1999	Socorro	LINEAR	·	1.0 km	MPC · JPL
103082	1999 XO_{159}	—	December 8, 1999	Socorro	LINEAR	MAR	3.1 km	MPC · JPL
103083	1999 XY_{159}	—	December 8, 1999	Socorro	LINEAR	V	1.8 km	MPC · JPL
103084	1999 XO_{160}	—	December 8, 1999	Socorro	LINEAR	NYS	2.0 km	MPC · JPL
103085	1999 XB_{161}	—	December 12, 1999	Socorro	LINEAR	·	3.8 km	MPC · JPL
103086	1999 XZ_{161}	—	December 13, 1999	Socorro	LINEAR	ADE	6.1 km	MPC · JPL
103087	1999 XW_{162}	—	December 8, 1999	Kitt Peak	Spacewatch	NYS	2.0 km	MPC · JPL
103088	1999 XD_{163}	—	December 8, 1999	Kitt Peak	Spacewatch	·	3.2 km	MPC · JPL
103089	1999 XL_{163}	—	December 8, 1999	Kitt Peak	Spacewatch	·	2.9 km	MPC · JPL
103090	1999 XO_{163}	—	December 8, 1999	Kitt Peak	Spacewatch	·	5.5 km	MPC · JPL
103091	1999 XJ_{164}	—	December 8, 1999	Socorro	LINEAR	·	3.0 km	MPC · JPL
103092	1999 XU_{164}	—	December 8, 1999	Socorro	LINEAR	·	3.5 km	MPC · JPL
103093	1999 XD_{166}	—	December 10, 1999	Socorro	LINEAR	·	6.5 km	MPC · JPL
103094	1999 XA_{167}	—	December 10, 1999	Socorro	LINEAR	·	4.7 km	MPC · JPL
103095	1999 XH_{167}	—	December 10, 1999	Socorro	LINEAR	·	2.7 km	MPC · JPL
103096	1999 XM_{167}	—	December 10, 1999	Socorro	LINEAR	·	1.9 km	MPC · JPL
103097	1999 XJ_{168}	—	December 10, 1999	Socorro	LINEAR	·	2.7 km	MPC · JPL
103098	1999 XA_{173}	—	December 10, 1999	Socorro	LINEAR	·	1.8 km	MPC · JPL
103099	1999 XL_{173}	—	December 10, 1999	Socorro	LINEAR	·	1.9 km	MPC · JPL
103100	1999 XU_{173}	—	December 10, 1999	Socorro	LINEAR	·	7.1 km	MPC · JPL

== 103101–103200 ==
back to top

Designation			Discovery			Properties		Ref
Permanent	Provisional	Named after	Date	Site	Discoverer(s)	Category	Diam.	Ref
103101	1999 XD_{174}	—	December 10, 1999	Socorro	LINEAR	·	1.4 km	MPC · JPL
103102	1999 XF_{174}	—	December 10, 1999	Socorro	LINEAR	·	1.9 km	MPC · JPL
103103	1999 XM_{174}	—	December 10, 1999	Socorro	LINEAR	·	6.4 km	MPC · JPL
103104	1999 XW_{174}	—	December 10, 1999	Socorro	LINEAR	·	3.9 km	MPC · JPL
103105	1999 XB_{175}	—	December 10, 1999	Socorro	LINEAR	·	1.9 km	MPC · JPL
103106	1999 XT_{176}	—	December 10, 1999	Socorro	LINEAR	·	6.0 km	MPC · JPL
103107	1999 XE_{177}	—	December 10, 1999	Socorro	LINEAR	·	4.3 km	MPC · JPL
103108	1999 XF_{177}	—	December 10, 1999	Socorro	LINEAR	·	7.9 km	MPC · JPL
103109	1999 XN_{177}	—	December 10, 1999	Socorro	LINEAR	·	2.8 km	MPC · JPL
103110	1999 XP_{177}	—	December 10, 1999	Socorro	LINEAR	(5)	2.3 km	MPC · JPL
103111	1999 XY_{177}	—	December 10, 1999	Socorro	LINEAR	·	1.6 km	MPC · JPL
103112	1999 XA_{178}	—	December 10, 1999	Socorro	LINEAR	·	5.1 km	MPC · JPL
103113	1999 XD_{178}	—	December 10, 1999	Socorro	LINEAR	HNS	2.4 km	MPC · JPL
103114	1999 XH_{178}	—	December 10, 1999	Socorro	LINEAR	·	2.1 km	MPC · JPL
103115	1999 XN_{180}	—	December 10, 1999	Socorro	LINEAR	·	4.2 km	MPC · JPL
103116	1999 XD_{181}	—	December 12, 1999	Socorro	LINEAR	·	4.0 km	MPC · JPL
103117	1999 XY_{181}	—	December 12, 1999	Socorro	LINEAR	·	5.2 km	MPC · JPL
103118	1999 XY_{182}	—	December 12, 1999	Socorro	LINEAR	·	4.9 km	MPC · JPL
103119	1999 XR_{184}	—	December 12, 1999	Socorro	LINEAR	·	5.8 km	MPC · JPL
103120	1999 XN_{185}	—	December 12, 1999	Socorro	LINEAR	·	3.4 km	MPC · JPL
103121	1999 XP_{188}	—	December 12, 1999	Socorro	LINEAR	EUN	4.3 km	MPC · JPL
103122	1999 XA_{189}	—	December 12, 1999	Socorro	LINEAR	·	5.1 km	MPC · JPL
103123	1999 XG_{189}	—	December 12, 1999	Socorro	LINEAR	DOR	6.3 km	MPC · JPL
103124	1999 XD_{190}	—	December 12, 1999	Socorro	LINEAR	·	4.0 km	MPC · JPL
103125	1999 XQ_{191}	—	December 12, 1999	Socorro	LINEAR	(2076)	3.5 km	MPC · JPL
103126	1999 XX_{191}	—	December 12, 1999	Socorro	LINEAR	·	2.6 km	MPC · JPL
103127	1999 XR_{194}	—	December 12, 1999	Socorro	LINEAR	·	2.0 km	MPC · JPL
103128	1999 XZ_{195}	—	December 12, 1999	Socorro	LINEAR	·	1.5 km	MPC · JPL
103129	1999 XA_{196}	—	December 12, 1999	Socorro	LINEAR	·	1.8 km	MPC · JPL
103130	1999 XR_{196}	—	December 12, 1999	Socorro	LINEAR	·	7.1 km	MPC · JPL
103131	1999 XK_{197}	—	December 12, 1999	Socorro	LINEAR	·	1.7 km	MPC · JPL
103132	1999 XY_{198}	—	December 12, 1999	Socorro	LINEAR	V	1.5 km	MPC · JPL
103133	1999 XX_{199}	—	December 12, 1999	Socorro	LINEAR	PAD	4.4 km	MPC · JPL
103134	1999 XE_{202}	—	December 12, 1999	Socorro	LINEAR	V	1.7 km	MPC · JPL
103135	1999 XL_{202}	—	December 12, 1999	Socorro	LINEAR	V	1.5 km	MPC · JPL
103136	1999 XF_{203}	—	December 12, 1999	Socorro	LINEAR	·	6.1 km	MPC · JPL
103137	1999 XN_{203}	—	December 12, 1999	Socorro	LINEAR	·	1.4 km	MPC · JPL
103138	1999 XP_{204}	—	December 12, 1999	Socorro	LINEAR	·	2.2 km	MPC · JPL
103139	1999 XS_{205}	—	December 12, 1999	Socorro	LINEAR	·	4.3 km	MPC · JPL
103140	1999 XB_{206}	—	December 12, 1999	Socorro	LINEAR	·	3.8 km	MPC · JPL
103141	1999 XF_{206}	—	December 12, 1999	Socorro	LINEAR	·	6.3 km	MPC · JPL
103142	1999 XM_{207}	—	December 12, 1999	Socorro	LINEAR	EUN	7.0 km	MPC · JPL
103143	1999 XY_{208}	—	December 13, 1999	Socorro	LINEAR	·	3.2 km	MPC · JPL
103144	1999 XY_{209}	—	December 13, 1999	Socorro	LINEAR	·	3.2 km	MPC · JPL
103145	1999 XQ_{210}	—	December 13, 1999	Socorro	LINEAR	·	4.7 km	MPC · JPL
103146	1999 XS_{210}	—	December 13, 1999	Socorro	LINEAR	·	2.5 km	MPC · JPL
103147	1999 XU_{212}	—	December 14, 1999	Socorro	LINEAR	·	3.1 km	MPC · JPL
103148	1999 XQ_{213}	—	December 14, 1999	Socorro	LINEAR	·	2.2 km	MPC · JPL
103149	1999 XC_{215}	—	December 14, 1999	Socorro	LINEAR	·	5.0 km	MPC · JPL
103150	1999 XP_{215}	—	December 14, 1999	Socorro	LINEAR	·	5.5 km	MPC · JPL
103151	1999 XR_{217}	—	December 13, 1999	Kitt Peak	Spacewatch	·	2.6 km	MPC · JPL
103152	1999 XR_{220}	—	December 14, 1999	Socorro	LINEAR	·	2.5 km	MPC · JPL
103153	1999 XT_{220}	—	December 14, 1999	Socorro	LINEAR	·	1.4 km	MPC · JPL
103154	1999 XZ_{221}	—	December 15, 1999	Socorro	LINEAR	EUN	2.3 km	MPC · JPL
103155	1999 XN_{222}	—	December 15, 1999	Socorro	LINEAR	·	2.5 km	MPC · JPL
103156	1999 XT_{222}	—	December 15, 1999	Socorro	LINEAR	·	3.9 km	MPC · JPL
103157	1999 XU_{223}	—	December 13, 1999	Kitt Peak	Spacewatch	·	3.3 km	MPC · JPL
103158	1999 XB_{224}	—	December 13, 1999	Kitt Peak	Spacewatch	·	1.7 km	MPC · JPL
103159	1999 XP_{224}	—	December 13, 1999	Kitt Peak	Spacewatch	KOR	2.8 km	MPC · JPL
103160	1999 XW_{224}	—	December 13, 1999	Kitt Peak	Spacewatch	·	4.2 km	MPC · JPL
103161	1999 XF_{225}	—	December 13, 1999	Kitt Peak	Spacewatch	·	1.7 km	MPC · JPL
103162	1999 XZ_{225}	—	December 13, 1999	Kitt Peak	Spacewatch	·	1.6 km	MPC · JPL
103163	1999 XR_{226}	—	December 14, 1999	Kitt Peak	Spacewatch	·	2.2 km	MPC · JPL
103164	1999 XX_{226}	—	December 15, 1999	Kitt Peak	Spacewatch	(2076)	2.1 km	MPC · JPL
103165	1999 XN_{227}	—	December 15, 1999	Kitt Peak	Spacewatch	·	2.4 km	MPC · JPL
103166	1999 XT_{227}	—	December 15, 1999	Kitt Peak	Spacewatch	·	1.8 km	MPC · JPL
103167	1999 XS_{228}	—	December 14, 1999	Kitt Peak	Spacewatch	·	3.6 km	MPC · JPL
103168	1999 XW_{228}	—	December 14, 1999	Kitt Peak	Spacewatch	·	1.1 km	MPC · JPL
103169	1999 XR_{229}	—	December 7, 1999	Catalina	CSS	EUN	2.2 km	MPC · JPL
103170	1999 XL_{230}	—	December 7, 1999	Anderson Mesa	LONEOS	EUN	2.8 km	MPC · JPL
103171	1999 XC_{231}	—	December 7, 1999	Catalina	CSS	·	3.5 km	MPC · JPL
103172	1999 XL_{231}	—	December 8, 1999	Catalina	CSS	·	5.1 km	MPC · JPL
103173	1999 XS_{233}	—	December 4, 1999	Anderson Mesa	LONEOS	·	1.9 km	MPC · JPL
103174	1999 XK_{234}	—	December 4, 1999	Anderson Mesa	LONEOS	EUN	2.2 km	MPC · JPL
103175	1999 XS_{234}	—	December 3, 1999	Anderson Mesa	LONEOS	·	4.9 km	MPC · JPL
103176	1999 XT_{234}	—	December 3, 1999	Anderson Mesa	LONEOS	·	4.2 km	MPC · JPL
103177	1999 XU_{234}	—	December 3, 1999	Anderson Mesa	LONEOS	·	2.6 km	MPC · JPL
103178	1999 XL_{235}	—	December 2, 1999	Kitt Peak	Spacewatch	·	1.1 km	MPC · JPL
103179	1999 XO_{236}	—	December 5, 1999	Anderson Mesa	LONEOS	EOS	4.8 km	MPC · JPL
103180	1999 XF_{237}	—	December 5, 1999	Catalina	CSS	·	2.0 km	MPC · JPL
103181	1999 XR_{237}	—	December 5, 1999	Catalina	CSS	·	2.2 km	MPC · JPL
103182	1999 XJ_{238}	—	December 2, 1999	Kitt Peak	Spacewatch	EUN	3.0 km	MPC · JPL
103183	1999 XA_{239}	—	December 6, 1999	Kitt Peak	Spacewatch	(5)	2.1 km	MPC · JPL
103184	1999 XG_{239}	—	December 6, 1999	Socorro	LINEAR	EUN	3.4 km	MPC · JPL
103185	1999 XD_{242}	—	December 13, 1999	Catalina	CSS	·	2.4 km	MPC · JPL
103186	1999 XH_{242}	—	December 13, 1999	Anderson Mesa	LONEOS	·	6.9 km	MPC · JPL
103187	1999 XS_{242}	—	December 13, 1999	Socorro	LINEAR	·	3.7 km	MPC · JPL
103188	1999 XT_{242}	—	December 13, 1999	Socorro	LINEAR	·	3.5 km	MPC · JPL
103189	1999 XV_{242}	—	December 13, 1999	Socorro	LINEAR	EUN	4.0 km	MPC · JPL
103190	1999 XD_{243}	—	December 2, 1999	Socorro	LINEAR	EUN	2.9 km	MPC · JPL
103191	1999 XE_{243}	—	December 3, 1999	Anderson Mesa	LONEOS	·	3.1 km	MPC · JPL
103192	1999 XF_{243}	—	December 5, 1999	Anderson Mesa	LONEOS	·	2.3 km	MPC · JPL
103193	1999 XG_{243}	—	December 5, 1999	Anderson Mesa	LONEOS	·	4.5 km	MPC · JPL
103194	1999 XX_{243}	—	December 5, 1999	Anderson Mesa	LONEOS	PHO	2.3 km	MPC · JPL
103195	1999 XZ_{243}	—	December 5, 1999	Anderson Mesa	LONEOS	·	3.7 km	MPC · JPL
103196	1999 XA_{244}	—	December 5, 1999	Anderson Mesa	LONEOS	HNS · slow	4.1 km	MPC · JPL
103197	1999 XZ_{247}	—	December 6, 1999	Socorro	LINEAR	·	2.2 km	MPC · JPL
103198	1999 XT_{248}	—	December 6, 1999	Socorro	LINEAR	·	2.1 km	MPC · JPL
103199	1999 XE_{249}	—	December 6, 1999	Socorro	LINEAR	·	3.7 km	MPC · JPL
103200	1999 XL_{249}	—	December 6, 1999	Socorro	LINEAR	·	2.1 km	MPC · JPL

== 103201–103300 ==
back to top

Designation			Discovery			Properties		Ref
Permanent	Provisional	Named after	Date	Site	Discoverer(s)	Category	Diam.	Ref
103201	1999 XB_{250}	—	December 6, 1999	Socorro	LINEAR	DOR	5.6 km	MPC · JPL
103202	1999 XW_{250}	—	December 5, 1999	Kitt Peak	Spacewatch	AEO	2.5 km	MPC · JPL
103203	1999 XM_{251}	—	December 9, 1999	Kitt Peak	Spacewatch	·	1.1 km	MPC · JPL
103204	1999 XN_{251}	—	December 9, 1999	Kitt Peak	Spacewatch	·	1.2 km	MPC · JPL
103205	1999 XJ_{252}	—	December 9, 1999	Kitt Peak	Spacewatch	·	3.8 km	MPC · JPL
103206	1999 XN_{252}	—	December 12, 1999	Kitt Peak	Spacewatch	·	2.1 km	MPC · JPL
103207	1999 XA_{253}	—	December 12, 1999	Kitt Peak	Spacewatch	·	2.4 km	MPC · JPL
103208	1999 XN_{254}	—	December 12, 1999	Kitt Peak	Spacewatch	·	2.2 km	MPC · JPL
103209	1999 XX_{256}	—	December 7, 1999	Catalina	CSS	slow	5.3 km	MPC · JPL
103210	1999 XK_{257}	—	December 7, 1999	Socorro	LINEAR	(5)	3.3 km	MPC · JPL
103211	1999 XA_{258}	—	December 8, 1999	Kitt Peak	Spacewatch	·	5.1 km	MPC · JPL
103212	1999 XV_{258}	—	December 6, 1999	Socorro	LINEAR	MRX	2.5 km	MPC · JPL
103213	1999 XL_{259}	—	December 5, 1999	Anderson Mesa	LONEOS	PHO	3.3 km	MPC · JPL
103214	1999 XG_{260}	—	December 8, 1999	Socorro	LINEAR	·	3.0 km	MPC · JPL
103215	1999 XZ_{260}	—	December 8, 1999	Socorro	LINEAR	·	1.3 km	MPC · JPL
103216	1999 XT_{261}	—	December 4, 1999	Anderson Mesa	LONEOS	·	5.5 km	MPC · JPL
103217	1999 YK_{1}	—	December 17, 1999	Socorro	LINEAR	PHO	2.9 km	MPC · JPL
103218	1999 YV_{2}	—	December 16, 1999	Kitt Peak	Spacewatch	·	1.4 km	MPC · JPL
103219	1999 YX_{3}	—	December 19, 1999	Socorro	LINEAR	HNS	2.4 km	MPC · JPL
103220 Kwongchuikuen	1999 YQ_{4}	Kwongchuikuen	December 28, 1999	Rock Finder	W. K. Y. Yeung	·	3.7 km	MPC · JPL
103221	1999 YC_{5}	—	December 29, 1999	Baton Rouge	W. R. Cooney Jr.	·	2.6 km	MPC · JPL
103222	1999 YD_{5}	—	December 29, 1999	Baton Rouge	W. R. Cooney Jr.	·	1.4 km	MPC · JPL
103223	1999 YT_{6}	—	December 30, 1999	Socorro	LINEAR	·	3.5 km	MPC · JPL
103224	1999 YP_{8}	—	December 27, 1999	Kitt Peak	Spacewatch	·	3.3 km	MPC · JPL
103225	1999 YQ_{8}	—	December 27, 1999	Kitt Peak	Spacewatch	·	2.2 km	MPC · JPL
103226	1999 YH_{9}	—	December 31, 1999	Višnjan Observatory	K. Korlević	H	1.2 km	MPC · JPL
103227	1999 YR_{10}	—	December 27, 1999	Kitt Peak	Spacewatch	·	2.1 km	MPC · JPL
103228	1999 YT_{13}	—	December 31, 1999	Višnjan Observatory	K. Korlević	·	1.8 km	MPC · JPL
103229	1999 YA_{14}	—	December 27, 1999	Kitt Peak	Spacewatch	·	1.7 km	MPC · JPL
103230	1999 YE_{15}	—	December 31, 1999	Kitt Peak	Spacewatch	·	2.2 km	MPC · JPL
103231	1999 YM_{15}	—	December 31, 1999	Kitt Peak	Spacewatch	·	1.0 km	MPC · JPL
103232	1999 YU_{16}	—	December 31, 1999	Kitt Peak	Spacewatch	·	2.6 km	MPC · JPL
103233	1999 YM_{17}	—	December 31, 1999	Kitt Peak	Spacewatch	·	1.3 km	MPC · JPL
103234	1999 YY_{19}	—	December 30, 1999	Mauna Kea	Veillet, C.	·	2.2 km	MPC · JPL
103235	1999 YM_{22}	—	December 30, 1999	Socorro	LINEAR	·	4.0 km	MPC · JPL
103236	1999 YV_{24}	—	December 27, 1999	Kitt Peak	Spacewatch	·	1.5 km	MPC · JPL
103237	1999 YO_{26}	—	December 30, 1999	Socorro	LINEAR	MAR	3.8 km	MPC · JPL
103238	1999 YA_{28}	—	December 17, 1999	Socorro	LINEAR	·	3.2 km	MPC · JPL
103239	2000 AS	—	January 2, 2000	Kitt Peak	Spacewatch	·	2.5 km	MPC · JPL
103240	2000 AC_{1}	—	January 2, 2000	Kitt Peak	Spacewatch	·	4.3 km	MPC · JPL
103241	2000 AK_{2}	—	January 3, 2000	Oizumi	T. Kobayashi	·	5.3 km	MPC · JPL
103242	2000 AL_{3}	—	January 2, 2000	Socorro	LINEAR	·	3.5 km	MPC · JPL
103243	2000 AV_{3}	—	January 3, 2000	Socorro	LINEAR	·	5.6 km	MPC · JPL
103244	2000 AK_{4}	—	January 3, 2000	Kitt Peak	Spacewatch	V	1.0 km	MPC · JPL
103245	2000 AN_{4}	—	January 3, 2000	Kitt Peak	Spacewatch	·	3.8 km	MPC · JPL
103246	2000 AQ_{4}	—	January 3, 2000	Farra d'Isonzo	Farra d'Isonzo	·	4.6 km	MPC · JPL
103247	2000 AS_{4}	—	January 3, 2000	Višnjan Observatory	K. Korlević	·	2.1 km	MPC · JPL
103248	2000 AZ_{4}	—	January 2, 2000	San Marcello	A. Boattini, M. Tombelli	·	1.7 km	MPC · JPL
103249	2000 AA_{5}	—	January 3, 2000	San Marcello	A. Boattini, G. Forti	·	3.6 km	MPC · JPL
103250	2000 AY_{6}	—	January 2, 2000	Socorro	LINEAR	·	4.2 km	MPC · JPL
103251	2000 AN_{7}	—	January 2, 2000	Socorro	LINEAR	·	1.9 km	MPC · JPL
103252	2000 AG_{9}	—	January 2, 2000	Socorro	LINEAR	·	1.7 km	MPC · JPL
103253	2000 AC_{13}	—	January 3, 2000	Socorro	LINEAR	AGN	2.4 km	MPC · JPL
103254	2000 AX_{13}	—	January 3, 2000	Socorro	LINEAR	·	1.5 km	MPC · JPL
103255	2000 AD_{14}	—	January 3, 2000	Socorro	LINEAR	EUN	3.6 km	MPC · JPL
103256	2000 AY_{14}	—	January 3, 2000	Socorro	LINEAR	·	4.6 km	MPC · JPL
103257	2000 AG_{19}	—	January 3, 2000	Socorro	LINEAR	·	2.3 km	MPC · JPL
103258	2000 AH_{20}	—	January 3, 2000	Socorro	LINEAR	·	2.5 km	MPC · JPL
103259	2000 AZ_{20}	—	January 3, 2000	Socorro	LINEAR	MRX	2.9 km	MPC · JPL
103260	2000 AF_{22}	—	January 3, 2000	Socorro	LINEAR	·	6.5 km	MPC · JPL
103261	2000 AJ_{23}	—	January 3, 2000	Socorro	LINEAR	(5)	2.3 km	MPC · JPL
103262	2000 AM_{24}	—	January 3, 2000	Socorro	LINEAR	·	5.4 km	MPC · JPL
103263	2000 AB_{25}	—	January 3, 2000	Socorro	LINEAR	EMA	8.0 km	MPC · JPL
103264	2000 AQ_{25}	—	January 3, 2000	Socorro	LINEAR	·	3.0 km	MPC · JPL
103265	2000 AY_{25}	—	January 3, 2000	Socorro	LINEAR	·	1.4 km	MPC · JPL
103266	2000 AT_{26}	—	January 3, 2000	Socorro	LINEAR	·	5.6 km	MPC · JPL
103267	2000 AK_{27}	—	January 3, 2000	Socorro	LINEAR	MRX	2.5 km	MPC · JPL
103268	2000 AV_{27}	—	January 3, 2000	Socorro	LINEAR	·	4.3 km	MPC · JPL
103269	2000 AG_{28}	—	January 3, 2000	Socorro	LINEAR	·	1.9 km	MPC · JPL
103270	2000 AJ_{30}	—	January 3, 2000	Socorro	LINEAR	GEF	2.5 km	MPC · JPL
103271	2000 AR_{30}	—	January 3, 2000	Socorro	LINEAR	·	1.8 km	MPC · JPL
103272	2000 AX_{30}	—	January 3, 2000	Socorro	LINEAR	·	5.1 km	MPC · JPL
103273	2000 AQ_{32}	—	January 3, 2000	Socorro	LINEAR	NYS	2.2 km	MPC · JPL
103274	2000 AF_{33}	—	January 3, 2000	Socorro	LINEAR	·	4.4 km	MPC · JPL
103275	2000 AM_{33}	—	January 3, 2000	Socorro	LINEAR	·	6.2 km	MPC · JPL
103276	2000 AT_{33}	—	January 5, 2000	Socorro	LINEAR	·	1.9 km	MPC · JPL
103277	2000 AU_{33}	—	January 3, 2000	Socorro	LINEAR	BRA	3.3 km	MPC · JPL
103278	2000 AG_{34}	—	January 3, 2000	Socorro	LINEAR	·	1.3 km	MPC · JPL
103279	2000 AD_{35}	—	January 3, 2000	Socorro	LINEAR	·	3.5 km	MPC · JPL
103280	2000 AV_{36}	—	January 3, 2000	Socorro	LINEAR	·	2.4 km	MPC · JPL
103281	2000 AY_{36}	—	January 3, 2000	Socorro	LINEAR	·	1.0 km	MPC · JPL
103282	2000 AX_{37}	—	January 3, 2000	Socorro	LINEAR	MRX	1.8 km	MPC · JPL
103283	2000 AZ_{38}	—	January 3, 2000	Socorro	LINEAR	·	1.8 km	MPC · JPL
103284	2000 AL_{39}	—	January 3, 2000	Socorro	LINEAR	NYS	3.3 km	MPC · JPL
103285	2000 AF_{40}	—	January 3, 2000	Socorro	LINEAR	(5)	2.0 km	MPC · JPL
103286	2000 AV_{40}	—	January 3, 2000	Socorro	LINEAR	ADE	6.4 km	MPC · JPL
103287	2000 AD_{41}	—	January 3, 2000	Socorro	LINEAR	·	1.5 km	MPC · JPL
103288	2000 AA_{42}	—	January 3, 2000	Socorro	LINEAR	·	4.0 km	MPC · JPL
103289	2000 AF_{42}	—	January 2, 2000	Gnosca	S. Sposetti	·	3.5 km	MPC · JPL
103290	2000 AN_{43}	—	January 5, 2000	Črni Vrh	Mikuž, H.	·	3.6 km	MPC · JPL
103291	2000 AL_{44}	—	January 5, 2000	Kitt Peak	Spacewatch	·	2.3 km	MPC · JPL
103292	2000 AD_{45}	—	January 5, 2000	Kitt Peak	Spacewatch	·	2.5 km	MPC · JPL
103293	2000 AN_{45}	—	January 3, 2000	Socorro	LINEAR	·	2.6 km	MPC · JPL
103294	2000 AS_{45}	—	January 3, 2000	Socorro	LINEAR	·	6.1 km	MPC · JPL
103295	2000 AA_{46}	—	January 3, 2000	Socorro	LINEAR	·	3.1 km	MPC · JPL
103296	2000 AY_{46}	—	January 4, 2000	Socorro	LINEAR	·	2.4 km	MPC · JPL
103297	2000 AC_{47}	—	January 4, 2000	Socorro	LINEAR	·	3.6 km	MPC · JPL
103298	2000 AU_{47}	—	January 4, 2000	Socorro	LINEAR	·	3.0 km	MPC · JPL
103299	2000 AV_{47}	—	January 4, 2000	Socorro	LINEAR	·	2.8 km	MPC · JPL
103300	2000 AX_{47}	—	January 4, 2000	Socorro	LINEAR	EUN	2.8 km	MPC · JPL

== 103301–103400 ==
back to top

Designation			Discovery			Properties		Ref
Permanent	Provisional	Named after	Date	Site	Discoverer(s)	Category	Diam.	Ref
103301	2000 AL_{49}	—	January 5, 2000	Socorro	LINEAR	H	1.7 km	MPC · JPL
103302	2000 AF_{50}	—	January 5, 2000	Višnjan Observatory	K. Korlević	·	2.4 km	MPC · JPL
103303	2000 AM_{50}	—	January 6, 2000	Višnjan Observatory	K. Korlević	·	3.0 km	MPC · JPL
103304	2000 AF_{53}	—	January 4, 2000	Socorro	LINEAR	·	2.6 km	MPC · JPL
103305	2000 AO_{53}	—	January 4, 2000	Socorro	LINEAR	MIS	5.0 km	MPC · JPL
103306	2000 AU_{53}	—	January 4, 2000	Socorro	LINEAR	·	2.4 km	MPC · JPL
103307	2000 AM_{54}	—	January 4, 2000	Socorro	LINEAR	RAF	1.8 km	MPC · JPL
103308	2000 AH_{55}	—	January 4, 2000	Socorro	LINEAR	·	1.6 km	MPC · JPL
103309	2000 AR_{55}	—	January 4, 2000	Socorro	LINEAR	·	2.2 km	MPC · JPL
103310	2000 AA_{56}	—	January 4, 2000	Socorro	LINEAR	·	3.0 km	MPC · JPL
103311	2000 AH_{56}	—	January 4, 2000	Socorro	LINEAR	V	2.1 km	MPC · JPL
103312	2000 AL_{56}	—	January 4, 2000	Socorro	LINEAR	(5)	2.3 km	MPC · JPL
103313	2000 AP_{56}	—	January 4, 2000	Socorro	LINEAR	·	4.2 km	MPC · JPL
103314	2000 AY_{56}	—	January 4, 2000	Socorro	LINEAR	·	2.5 km	MPC · JPL
103315	2000 AV_{59}	—	January 4, 2000	Socorro	LINEAR	EUN	2.9 km	MPC · JPL
103316	2000 AD_{60}	—	January 4, 2000	Socorro	LINEAR	·	2.4 km	MPC · JPL
103317	2000 AK_{60}	—	January 4, 2000	Socorro	LINEAR	·	9.3 km	MPC · JPL
103318	2000 AS_{60}	—	January 4, 2000	Socorro	LINEAR	·	7.5 km	MPC · JPL
103319	2000 AZ_{62}	—	January 4, 2000	Socorro	LINEAR	·	2.0 km	MPC · JPL
103320	2000 AN_{64}	—	January 4, 2000	Socorro	LINEAR	·	4.7 km	MPC · JPL
103321	2000 AX_{65}	—	January 4, 2000	Socorro	LINEAR	·	3.1 km	MPC · JPL
103322	2000 AH_{66}	—	January 4, 2000	Socorro	LINEAR	·	3.3 km	MPC · JPL
103323	2000 AA_{67}	—	January 4, 2000	Socorro	LINEAR	·	2.1 km	MPC · JPL
103324	2000 AB_{67}	—	January 4, 2000	Socorro	LINEAR	·	3.2 km	MPC · JPL
103325	2000 AC_{67}	—	January 4, 2000	Socorro	LINEAR	·	1.2 km	MPC · JPL
103326	2000 AD_{67}	—	January 4, 2000	Socorro	LINEAR	·	6.1 km	MPC · JPL
103327	2000 AQ_{68}	—	January 5, 2000	Socorro	LINEAR	·	3.8 km	MPC · JPL
103328	2000 AC_{69}	—	January 5, 2000	Socorro	LINEAR	·	3.9 km	MPC · JPL
103329	2000 AN_{69}	—	January 5, 2000	Socorro	LINEAR	·	1.6 km	MPC · JPL
103330	2000 AX_{69}	—	January 5, 2000	Socorro	LINEAR	(5)	3.5 km	MPC · JPL
103331	2000 AY_{69}	—	January 5, 2000	Socorro	LINEAR	·	2.8 km	MPC · JPL
103332	2000 AZ_{69}	—	January 5, 2000	Socorro	LINEAR	·	2.2 km	MPC · JPL
103333	2000 AN_{70}	—	January 5, 2000	Socorro	LINEAR	·	1.7 km	MPC · JPL
103334	2000 AZ_{72}	—	January 5, 2000	Socorro	LINEAR	·	2.2 km	MPC · JPL
103335	2000 AF_{75}	—	January 5, 2000	Socorro	LINEAR	·	3.6 km	MPC · JPL
103336	2000 AH_{77}	—	January 5, 2000	Socorro	LINEAR	·	2.5 km	MPC · JPL
103337	2000 AG_{78}	—	January 5, 2000	Socorro	LINEAR	RAF	2.4 km	MPC · JPL
103338	2000 AN_{78}	—	January 5, 2000	Socorro	LINEAR	·	2.3 km	MPC · JPL
103339	2000 AV_{79}	—	January 5, 2000	Socorro	LINEAR	·	4.0 km	MPC · JPL
103340	2000 AW_{81}	—	January 5, 2000	Socorro	LINEAR	(5)	3.5 km	MPC · JPL
103341	2000 AG_{82}	—	January 5, 2000	Socorro	LINEAR	GEF	2.3 km	MPC · JPL
103342	2000 AX_{83}	—	January 5, 2000	Socorro	LINEAR	·	1.8 km	MPC · JPL
103343	2000 AX_{84}	—	January 5, 2000	Socorro	LINEAR	·	3.5 km	MPC · JPL
103344	2000 AC_{85}	—	January 5, 2000	Socorro	LINEAR	·	3.4 km	MPC · JPL
103345	2000 AU_{85}	—	January 5, 2000	Socorro	LINEAR	V	1.6 km	MPC · JPL
103346	2000 AD_{86}	—	January 5, 2000	Socorro	LINEAR	·	1.9 km	MPC · JPL
103347	2000 AK_{86}	—	January 5, 2000	Socorro	LINEAR	·	2.5 km	MPC · JPL
103348	2000 AL_{86}	—	January 5, 2000	Socorro	LINEAR	·	4.9 km	MPC · JPL
103349	2000 AN_{87}	—	January 5, 2000	Socorro	LINEAR	·	4.1 km	MPC · JPL
103350	2000 AV_{88}	—	January 5, 2000	Socorro	LINEAR	·	2.9 km	MPC · JPL
103351	2000 AS_{89}	—	January 5, 2000	Socorro	LINEAR	·	2.4 km	MPC · JPL
103352	2000 AO_{90}	—	January 5, 2000	Socorro	LINEAR	·	1.4 km	MPC · JPL
103353	2000 AP_{90}	—	January 5, 2000	Socorro	LINEAR	·	3.2 km	MPC · JPL
103354	2000 AV_{90}	—	January 5, 2000	Socorro	LINEAR	·	7.8 km	MPC · JPL
103355	2000 AY_{90}	—	January 5, 2000	Socorro	LINEAR	·	3.6 km	MPC · JPL
103356	2000 AJ_{92}	—	January 5, 2000	Socorro	LINEAR	·	3.5 km	MPC · JPL
103357	2000 AM_{92}	—	January 2, 2000	Socorro	LINEAR	PHO	3.7 km	MPC · JPL
103358	2000 AE_{93}	—	January 4, 2000	Socorro	LINEAR	·	1.9 km	MPC · JPL
103359	2000 AH_{93}	—	January 4, 2000	Socorro	LINEAR	·	2.6 km	MPC · JPL
103360	2000 AS_{94}	—	January 4, 2000	Socorro	LINEAR	·	1.7 km	MPC · JPL
103361	2000 AR_{95}	—	January 4, 2000	Socorro	LINEAR	·	5.1 km	MPC · JPL
103362	2000 AV_{95}	—	January 4, 2000	Socorro	LINEAR	·	2.1 km	MPC · JPL
103363	2000 AL_{100}	—	January 5, 2000	Socorro	LINEAR	(5)	3.4 km	MPC · JPL
103364	2000 AP_{102}	—	January 5, 2000	Socorro	LINEAR	EUN	3.8 km	MPC · JPL
103365	2000 AZ_{103}	—	January 5, 2000	Socorro	LINEAR	·	2.7 km	MPC · JPL
103366	2000 AQ_{104}	—	January 5, 2000	Socorro	LINEAR	·	5.5 km	MPC · JPL
103367	2000 AZ_{105}	—	January 5, 2000	Socorro	LINEAR	·	2.2 km	MPC · JPL
103368	2000 AF_{107}	—	January 5, 2000	Socorro	LINEAR	·	1.9 km	MPC · JPL
103369	2000 AN_{109}	—	January 5, 2000	Socorro	LINEAR	LEO	3.4 km	MPC · JPL
103370	2000 AH_{111}	—	January 5, 2000	Socorro	LINEAR	·	3.0 km	MPC · JPL
103371	2000 AO_{113}	—	January 5, 2000	Socorro	LINEAR	·	1.7 km	MPC · JPL
103372	2000 AS_{113}	—	January 5, 2000	Socorro	LINEAR	·	2.4 km	MPC · JPL
103373	2000 AM_{114}	—	January 5, 2000	Socorro	LINEAR	·	3.4 km	MPC · JPL
103374	2000 AQ_{114}	—	January 5, 2000	Socorro	LINEAR	·	1.5 km	MPC · JPL
103375	2000 AT_{114}	—	January 5, 2000	Socorro	LINEAR	·	1.4 km	MPC · JPL
103376	2000 AX_{118}	—	January 5, 2000	Socorro	LINEAR	EMA	7.3 km	MPC · JPL
103377	2000 AG_{119}	—	January 5, 2000	Socorro	LINEAR	DOR	4.4 km	MPC · JPL
103378	2000 AM_{119}	—	January 5, 2000	Socorro	LINEAR	·	1.6 km	MPC · JPL
103379	2000 AH_{120}	—	January 5, 2000	Socorro	LINEAR	·	5.6 km	MPC · JPL
103380	2000 AN_{120}	—	January 5, 2000	Socorro	LINEAR	V	1.5 km	MPC · JPL
103381	2000 AP_{120}	—	January 5, 2000	Socorro	LINEAR	·	4.3 km	MPC · JPL
103382	2000 AC_{121}	—	January 5, 2000	Socorro	LINEAR	·	1.8 km	MPC · JPL
103383	2000 AF_{121}	—	January 5, 2000	Socorro	LINEAR	·	1.8 km	MPC · JPL
103384	2000 AG_{121}	—	January 5, 2000	Socorro	LINEAR	·	3.4 km	MPC · JPL
103385	2000 AU_{121}	—	January 5, 2000	Socorro	LINEAR	V	1.4 km	MPC · JPL
103386	2000 AK_{122}	—	January 5, 2000	Socorro	LINEAR	·	2.5 km	MPC · JPL
103387	2000 AS_{123}	—	January 5, 2000	Socorro	LINEAR	·	4.4 km	MPC · JPL
103388	2000 AX_{123}	—	January 5, 2000	Socorro	LINEAR	·	2.4 km	MPC · JPL
103389	2000 AN_{124}	—	January 5, 2000	Socorro	LINEAR	·	1.4 km	MPC · JPL
103390	2000 AL_{125}	—	January 5, 2000	Socorro	LINEAR	·	3.8 km	MPC · JPL
103391	2000 AZ_{125}	—	January 5, 2000	Socorro	LINEAR	·	1.6 km	MPC · JPL
103392	2000 AC_{127}	—	January 5, 2000	Socorro	LINEAR	·	4.5 km	MPC · JPL
103393	2000 AF_{127}	—	January 5, 2000	Socorro	LINEAR	·	2.7 km	MPC · JPL
103394	2000 AO_{127}	—	January 5, 2000	Socorro	LINEAR	·	5.0 km	MPC · JPL
103395	2000 AX_{127}	—	January 5, 2000	Socorro	LINEAR	·	2.9 km	MPC · JPL
103396	2000 AC_{129}	—	January 5, 2000	Socorro	LINEAR	·	4.4 km	MPC · JPL
103397	2000 AJ_{129}	—	January 5, 2000	Socorro	LINEAR	·	3.9 km	MPC · JPL
103398	2000 AS_{129}	—	January 5, 2000	Socorro	LINEAR	·	4.1 km	MPC · JPL
103399	2000 AM_{130}	—	January 5, 2000	Socorro	LINEAR	·	1.9 km	MPC · JPL
103400	2000 AO_{130}	—	January 5, 2000	Socorro	LINEAR	·	3.7 km	MPC · JPL

== 103401–103500 ==
back to top

Designation			Discovery			Properties		Ref
Permanent	Provisional	Named after	Date	Site	Discoverer(s)	Category	Diam.	Ref
103401	2000 AW_{130}	—	January 6, 2000	Socorro	LINEAR	·	1.5 km	MPC · JPL
103402	2000 AA_{132}	—	January 3, 2000	Socorro	LINEAR	·	1.4 km	MPC · JPL
103403	2000 AG_{132}	—	January 3, 2000	Socorro	LINEAR	·	2.4 km	MPC · JPL
103404	2000 AJ_{134}	—	January 4, 2000	Socorro	LINEAR	·	3.8 km	MPC · JPL
103405	2000 AM_{134}	—	January 4, 2000	Socorro	LINEAR	MAS · slow?	1.5 km	MPC · JPL
103406	2000 AX_{135}	—	January 4, 2000	Socorro	LINEAR	·	2.9 km	MPC · JPL
103407	2000 AC_{136}	—	January 4, 2000	Socorro	LINEAR	·	2.1 km	MPC · JPL
103408	2000 AK_{140}	—	January 5, 2000	Socorro	LINEAR	(2076)	1.8 km	MPC · JPL
103409	2000 AP_{140}	—	January 5, 2000	Socorro	LINEAR	·	2.7 km	MPC · JPL
103410	2000 AR_{140}	—	January 5, 2000	Socorro	LINEAR	·	3.5 km	MPC · JPL
103411	2000 AR_{141}	—	January 5, 2000	Socorro	LINEAR	·	1.8 km	MPC · JPL
103412	2000 AS_{142}	—	January 5, 2000	Socorro	LINEAR	EUN	3.0 km	MPC · JPL
103413	2000 AL_{143}	—	January 5, 2000	Socorro	LINEAR	·	4.6 km	MPC · JPL
103414	2000 AX_{144}	—	January 5, 2000	Socorro	LINEAR	PHO	3.8 km	MPC · JPL
103415	2000 AF_{146}	—	January 7, 2000	Socorro	LINEAR	·	3.9 km	MPC · JPL
103416	2000 AM_{148}	—	January 7, 2000	Socorro	LINEAR	T_{j} (2.99)	8.2 km	MPC · JPL
103417	2000 AL_{150}	—	January 7, 2000	Socorro	LINEAR	GEF	2.6 km	MPC · JPL
103418	2000 AM_{150}	—	January 7, 2000	Socorro	LINEAR	·	1.4 km	MPC · JPL
103419	2000 AS_{150}	—	January 8, 2000	Socorro	LINEAR	·	3.0 km	MPC · JPL
103420	2000 AX_{150}	—	January 8, 2000	Socorro	LINEAR	·	2.3 km	MPC · JPL
103421 Laurmatt	2000 AD_{151}	Laurmatt	January 6, 2000	San Marcello	L. Tesi, G. Forti	·	2.0 km	MPC · JPL
103422 Laurisirén	2000 AG_{153}	Laurisirén	January 9, 2000	Nyrolä	A. Oksanen, Moilanen, M.	V	1.3 km	MPC · JPL
103423	2000 AM_{153}	—	January 11, 2000	Prescott	P. G. Comba	·	4.8 km	MPC · JPL
103424	2000 AY_{155}	—	January 3, 2000	Socorro	LINEAR	·	1.6 km	MPC · JPL
103425	2000 AX_{157}	—	January 3, 2000	Socorro	LINEAR	(7744)	3.2 km	MPC · JPL
103426	2000 AC_{158}	—	January 3, 2000	Socorro	LINEAR	·	2.5 km	MPC · JPL
103427	2000 AJ_{158}	—	January 3, 2000	Socorro	LINEAR	AEO	2.9 km	MPC · JPL
103428	2000 AN_{158}	—	January 3, 2000	Socorro	LINEAR	·	1.6 km	MPC · JPL
103429	2000 AJ_{159}	—	January 3, 2000	Socorro	LINEAR	·	1.6 km	MPC · JPL
103430	2000 AT_{159}	—	January 3, 2000	Socorro	LINEAR	·	3.1 km	MPC · JPL
103431	2000 AY_{159}	—	January 3, 2000	Socorro	LINEAR	·	2.0 km	MPC · JPL
103432	2000 AX_{160}	—	January 3, 2000	Socorro	LINEAR	·	4.2 km	MPC · JPL
103433	2000 AY_{165}	—	January 8, 2000	Socorro	LINEAR	·	2.8 km	MPC · JPL
103434	2000 AQ_{171}	—	January 7, 2000	Socorro	LINEAR	·	2.2 km	MPC · JPL
103435	2000 AO_{176}	—	January 7, 2000	Socorro	LINEAR	·	4.0 km	MPC · JPL
103436	2000 AE_{179}	—	January 7, 2000	Socorro	LINEAR	·	3.3 km	MPC · JPL
103437	2000 AJ_{181}	—	January 7, 2000	Socorro	LINEAR	·	1.9 km	MPC · JPL
103438	2000 AT_{182}	—	January 7, 2000	Socorro	LINEAR	·	3.4 km	MPC · JPL
103439	2000 AK_{184}	—	January 7, 2000	Socorro	LINEAR	EUN	3.2 km	MPC · JPL
103440	2000 AC_{187}	—	January 8, 2000	Socorro	LINEAR	·	3.5 km	MPC · JPL
103441	2000 AN_{187}	—	January 8, 2000	Socorro	LINEAR	EUN	2.1 km	MPC · JPL
103442	2000 AO_{187}	—	January 8, 2000	Socorro	LINEAR	MAR	2.8 km	MPC · JPL
103443	2000 AP_{188}	—	January 8, 2000	Socorro	LINEAR	·	3.1 km	MPC · JPL
103444	2000 AD_{189}	—	January 8, 2000	Socorro	LINEAR	·	2.4 km	MPC · JPL
103445	2000 AJ_{190}	—	January 8, 2000	Socorro	LINEAR	EUN	2.1 km	MPC · JPL
103446	2000 AS_{190}	—	January 8, 2000	Socorro	LINEAR	·	5.7 km	MPC · JPL
103447	2000 AD_{191}	—	January 8, 2000	Socorro	LINEAR	·	4.2 km	MPC · JPL
103448	2000 AL_{192}	—	January 8, 2000	Socorro	LINEAR	·	3.0 km	MPC · JPL
103449	2000 AM_{192}	—	January 8, 2000	Socorro	LINEAR	·	3.6 km	MPC · JPL
103450	2000 AJ_{193}	—	January 8, 2000	Socorro	LINEAR	BRG	3.6 km	MPC · JPL
103451	2000 AM_{193}	—	January 8, 2000	Socorro	LINEAR	EUN	3.1 km	MPC · JPL
103452	2000 AY_{193}	—	January 8, 2000	Socorro	LINEAR	·	3.3 km	MPC · JPL
103453	2000 AU_{194}	—	January 8, 2000	Socorro	LINEAR	·	4.8 km	MPC · JPL
103454	2000 AE_{196}	—	January 8, 2000	Socorro	LINEAR	·	3.0 km	MPC · JPL
103455	2000 AJ_{196}	—	January 8, 2000	Socorro	LINEAR	526	4.1 km	MPC · JPL
103456	2000 AN_{196}	—	January 8, 2000	Socorro	LINEAR	CLO	6.1 km	MPC · JPL
103457	2000 AO_{196}	—	January 8, 2000	Socorro	LINEAR	·	2.0 km	MPC · JPL
103458	2000 AA_{199}	—	January 8, 2000	Socorro	LINEAR	GEF	2.5 km	MPC · JPL
103459	2000 AB_{201}	—	January 9, 2000	Socorro	LINEAR	BAR	4.0 km	MPC · JPL
103460 Dieterherrmann	2000 AC_{204}	Dieterherrmann	January 11, 2000	Drebach	G. Lehmann, J. Kandler	·	2.3 km	MPC · JPL
103461	2000 AX_{205}	—	January 14, 2000	Farpoint	Farpoint	PHO	1.9 km	MPC · JPL
103462	2000 AQ_{206}	—	January 3, 2000	Kitt Peak	Spacewatch	HOF	4.9 km	MPC · JPL
103463	2000 AF_{207}	—	January 3, 2000	Kitt Peak	Spacewatch	·	3.3 km	MPC · JPL
103464	2000 AG_{207}	—	January 3, 2000	Kitt Peak	Spacewatch	·	2.4 km	MPC · JPL
103465	2000 AB_{208}	—	January 4, 2000	Kitt Peak	Spacewatch	·	3.1 km	MPC · JPL
103466	2000 AC_{209}	—	January 4, 2000	Kitt Peak	Spacewatch	·	4.0 km	MPC · JPL
103467	2000 AD_{209}	—	January 4, 2000	Kitt Peak	Spacewatch	·	2.7 km	MPC · JPL
103468	2000 AX_{209}	—	January 5, 2000	Kitt Peak	Spacewatch	MAS	1.4 km	MPC · JPL
103469	2000 AK_{211}	—	January 5, 2000	Kitt Peak	Spacewatch	fast	2.2 km	MPC · JPL
103470	2000 AA_{212}	—	January 5, 2000	Kitt Peak	Spacewatch	·	3.2 km	MPC · JPL
103471	2000 AF_{212}	—	January 5, 2000	Kitt Peak	Spacewatch	·	2.6 km	MPC · JPL
103472	2000 AM_{212}	—	January 5, 2000	Kitt Peak	Spacewatch	NYS	1.8 km	MPC · JPL
103473	2000 AU_{212}	—	January 6, 2000	Kitt Peak	Spacewatch	NYS	2.4 km	MPC · JPL
103474	2000 AN_{213}	—	January 6, 2000	Kitt Peak	Spacewatch	·	3.0 km	MPC · JPL
103475	2000 AY_{214}	—	January 7, 2000	Kitt Peak	Spacewatch	·	1.7 km	MPC · JPL
103476	2000 AH_{215}	—	January 7, 2000	Kitt Peak	Spacewatch	·	4.0 km	MPC · JPL
103477	2000 AA_{219}	—	January 8, 2000	Kitt Peak	Spacewatch	GEF	2.1 km	MPC · JPL
103478	2000 AD_{219}	—	January 8, 2000	Kitt Peak	Spacewatch	PAD	3.5 km	MPC · JPL
103479	2000 AE_{223}	—	January 9, 2000	Kitt Peak	Spacewatch	·	2.6 km	MPC · JPL
103480	2000 AS_{223}	—	January 9, 2000	Kitt Peak	Spacewatch	THM	3.8 km	MPC · JPL
103481	2000 AP_{224}	—	January 11, 2000	Kitt Peak	Spacewatch	·	2.6 km	MPC · JPL
103482	2000 AB_{227}	—	January 10, 2000	Kitt Peak	Spacewatch	·	2.8 km	MPC · JPL
103483	2000 AJ_{227}	—	January 10, 2000	Kitt Peak	Spacewatch	·	2.4 km	MPC · JPL
103484	2000 AR_{227}	—	January 10, 2000	Kitt Peak	Spacewatch	·	1.8 km	MPC · JPL
103485	2000 AR_{231}	—	January 4, 2000	Socorro	LINEAR	·	6.8 km	MPC · JPL
103486	2000 AV_{231}	—	January 4, 2000	Socorro	LINEAR	·	1.5 km	MPC · JPL
103487	2000 AC_{232}	—	January 4, 2000	Socorro	LINEAR	·	3.2 km	MPC · JPL
103488	2000 AK_{232}	—	January 4, 2000	Socorro	LINEAR	·	2.1 km	MPC · JPL
103489	2000 AO_{232}	—	January 4, 2000	Socorro	LINEAR	·	2.8 km	MPC · JPL
103490	2000 AA_{235}	—	January 5, 2000	Socorro	LINEAR	·	3.9 km	MPC · JPL
103491	2000 AG_{236}	—	January 5, 2000	Anderson Mesa	LONEOS	·	4.8 km	MPC · JPL
103492	2000 AK_{236}	—	January 5, 2000	Kitt Peak	Spacewatch	·	2.7 km	MPC · JPL
103493	2000 AN_{237}	—	January 5, 2000	Anderson Mesa	LONEOS	·	5.1 km	MPC · JPL
103494	2000 AB_{239}	—	January 6, 2000	Socorro	LINEAR	AST	3.6 km	MPC · JPL
103495	2000 AJ_{239}	—	January 6, 2000	Socorro	LINEAR	·	2.4 km	MPC · JPL
103496	2000 AR_{239}	—	January 6, 2000	Socorro	LINEAR	·	6.7 km	MPC · JPL
103497	2000 AX_{240}	—	January 7, 2000	Anderson Mesa	LONEOS	PHO	3.0 km	MPC · JPL
103498	2000 AW_{243}	—	January 7, 2000	Socorro	LINEAR	·	2.7 km	MPC · JPL
103499	2000 AO_{244}	—	January 8, 2000	Socorro	LINEAR	EUN	2.3 km	MPC · JPL
103500	2000 AE_{245}	—	January 9, 2000	Socorro	LINEAR	PHO	2.3 km	MPC · JPL

== 103501–103600 ==
back to top

Designation			Discovery			Properties		Ref
Permanent	Provisional	Named after	Date	Site	Discoverer(s)	Category	Diam.	Ref
103501	2000 AT_{245}	—	January 8, 2000	Mauna Kea	D. J. Tholen, Whiteley, R. J.	·	2.5 km	MPC · JPL
103502	2000 AF_{247}	—	January 2, 2000	Socorro	LINEAR	·	1.8 km	MPC · JPL
103503	2000 AP_{248}	—	January 4, 2000	Anderson Mesa	LONEOS	·	3.7 km	MPC · JPL
103504	2000 AF_{254}	—	January 4, 2000	Socorro	LINEAR	·	2.8 km	MPC · JPL
103505	2000 BW	—	January 28, 2000	Socorro	LINEAR	H	1.3 km	MPC · JPL
103506	2000 BD_{1}	—	January 28, 2000	Socorro	LINEAR	slow	2.3 km	MPC · JPL
103507	2000 BK_{1}	—	January 26, 2000	Kitt Peak	Spacewatch	·	5.7 km	MPC · JPL
103508	2000 BV_{1}	—	January 27, 2000	Kitt Peak	Spacewatch	L4	10 km	MPC · JPL
103509	2000 BG_{2}	—	January 26, 2000	Višnjan Observatory	K. Korlević	·	2.4 km	MPC · JPL
103510	2000 BS_{2}	—	January 26, 2000	Socorro	LINEAR	PHO	2.8 km	MPC · JPL
103511	2000 BW_{2}	—	January 25, 2000	Višnjan Observatory	K. Korlević	·	2.2 km	MPC · JPL
103512	2000 BZ_{2}	—	January 26, 2000	Višnjan Observatory	K. Korlević	·	3.0 km	MPC · JPL
103513	2000 BM_{3}	—	January 27, 2000	Oizumi	T. Kobayashi	·	4.7 km	MPC · JPL
103514	2000 BD_{4}	—	January 21, 2000	Socorro	LINEAR	EUN	5.3 km	MPC · JPL
103515	2000 BR_{4}	—	January 21, 2000	Socorro	LINEAR	·	3.0 km	MPC · JPL
103516	2000 BY_{4}	—	January 21, 2000	Socorro	LINEAR	JUN	3.1 km	MPC · JPL
103517	2000 BE_{5}	—	January 27, 2000	Socorro	LINEAR	·	1.7 km	MPC · JPL
103518	2000 BF_{5}	—	January 27, 2000	Socorro	LINEAR	·	950 m	MPC · JPL
103519	2000 BW_{5}	—	January 27, 2000	Socorro	LINEAR	EUN	2.3 km	MPC · JPL
103520	2000 BB_{6}	—	January 28, 2000	Socorro	LINEAR	·	4.9 km	MPC · JPL
103521	2000 BH_{6}	—	January 28, 2000	Socorro	LINEAR	·	2.8 km	MPC · JPL
103522	2000 BQ_{6}	—	January 29, 2000	Socorro	LINEAR	·	1.3 km	MPC · JPL
103523	2000 BT_{6}	—	January 26, 2000	Socorro	LINEAR	·	7.3 km	MPC · JPL
103524	2000 BO_{7}	—	January 29, 2000	Socorro	LINEAR	·	1.5 km	MPC · JPL
103525	2000 BW_{7}	—	January 29, 2000	Socorro	LINEAR	·	1.7 km	MPC · JPL
103526	2000 BS_{8}	—	January 29, 2000	Socorro	LINEAR	·	1.7 km	MPC · JPL
103527	2000 BB_{9}	—	January 26, 2000	Kitt Peak	Spacewatch	·	2.2 km	MPC · JPL
103528	2000 BD_{10}	—	January 26, 2000	Kitt Peak	Spacewatch	·	1.9 km	MPC · JPL
103529	2000 BK_{10}	—	January 26, 2000	Kitt Peak	Spacewatch	·	3.4 km	MPC · JPL
103530	2000 BS_{11}	—	January 26, 2000	Kitt Peak	Spacewatch	·	1.8 km	MPC · JPL
103531	2000 BD_{12}	—	January 28, 2000	Kitt Peak	Spacewatch	KOR	2.1 km	MPC · JPL
103532	2000 BT_{12}	—	January 28, 2000	Kitt Peak	Spacewatch	·	2.3 km	MPC · JPL
103533	2000 BS_{14}	—	January 28, 2000	Oizumi	T. Kobayashi	·	7.1 km	MPC · JPL
103534	2000 BS_{16}	—	January 30, 2000	Socorro	LINEAR	·	4.6 km	MPC · JPL
103535	2000 BT_{16}	—	January 30, 2000	Socorro	LINEAR	·	2.7 km	MPC · JPL
103536	2000 BD_{17}	—	January 30, 2000	Socorro	LINEAR	·	2.5 km	MPC · JPL
103537	2000 BO_{17}	—	January 30, 2000	Socorro	LINEAR	3:2	10 km	MPC · JPL
103538	2000 BY_{17}	—	January 30, 2000	Socorro	LINEAR	·	4.9 km	MPC · JPL
103539	2000 BZ_{17}	—	January 30, 2000	Socorro	LINEAR	·	3.0 km	MPC · JPL
103540	2000 BT_{18}	—	January 30, 2000	Socorro	LINEAR	·	5.0 km	MPC · JPL
103541	2000 BU_{18}	—	January 30, 2000	Socorro	LINEAR	·	5.2 km	MPC · JPL
103542	2000 BV_{18}	—	January 29, 2000	Socorro	LINEAR	H	990 m	MPC · JPL
103543	2000 BJ_{20}	—	January 26, 2000	Kitt Peak	Spacewatch	·	1.9 km	MPC · JPL
103544	2000 BC_{21}	—	January 29, 2000	Kitt Peak	Spacewatch	·	1.5 km	MPC · JPL
103545	2000 BP_{22}	—	January 25, 2000	Višnjan Observatory	K. Korlević	·	2.2 km	MPC · JPL
103546	2000 BN_{23}	—	January 27, 2000	Socorro	LINEAR	WAT	4.0 km	MPC · JPL
103547	2000 BA_{24}	—	January 29, 2000	Socorro	LINEAR	EUN	2.8 km	MPC · JPL
103548	2000 BH_{24}	—	January 29, 2000	Socorro	LINEAR	DOR	5.2 km	MPC · JPL
103549	2000 BJ_{24}	—	January 29, 2000	Socorro	LINEAR	·	4.6 km	MPC · JPL
103550	2000 BS_{24}	—	January 29, 2000	Socorro	LINEAR	·	2.4 km	MPC · JPL
103551	2000 BJ_{25}	—	January 30, 2000	Socorro	LINEAR	·	1.6 km	MPC · JPL
103552	2000 BU_{26}	—	January 30, 2000	Socorro	LINEAR	·	3.0 km	MPC · JPL
103553	2000 BW_{26}	—	January 30, 2000	Socorro	LINEAR	·	3.2 km	MPC · JPL
103554	2000 BF_{27}	—	January 30, 2000	Socorro	LINEAR	·	1.8 km	MPC · JPL
103555	2000 BS_{27}	—	January 30, 2000	Socorro	LINEAR	·	4.3 km	MPC · JPL
103556	2000 BD_{28}	—	January 31, 2000	Socorro	LINEAR	NYS	2.3 km	MPC · JPL
103557	2000 BK_{28}	—	January 31, 2000	Socorro	LINEAR	·	2.9 km	MPC · JPL
103558	2000 BE_{29}	—	January 25, 2000	Višnjan Observatory	K. Korlević	·	3.1 km	MPC · JPL
103559	2000 BU_{31}	—	January 27, 2000	Kitt Peak	Spacewatch	·	2.9 km	MPC · JPL
103560 Peate	2000 BZ_{31}	Peate	January 30, 2000	Catalina	CSS	·	3.2 km	MPC · JPL
103561	2000 BJ_{32}	—	January 28, 2000	Kitt Peak	Spacewatch	·	3.7 km	MPC · JPL
103562	2000 BL_{33}	—	January 30, 2000	Catalina	CSS	·	2.5 km	MPC · JPL
103563	2000 BY_{33}	—	January 30, 2000	Catalina	CSS	NYS	1.7 km	MPC · JPL
103564	2000 BR_{34}	—	January 30, 2000	Catalina	CSS	PHO	2.5 km	MPC · JPL
103565	2000 BG_{35}	—	January 30, 2000	Socorro	LINEAR	EUN	2.4 km	MPC · JPL
103566	2000 BL_{35}	—	January 30, 2000	Socorro	LINEAR	·	3.8 km	MPC · JPL
103567	2000 BR_{40}	—	January 29, 2000	Kitt Peak	Spacewatch	·	1.9 km	MPC · JPL
103568	2000 BZ_{41}	—	January 30, 2000	Kitt Peak	Spacewatch	·	1.9 km	MPC · JPL
103569	2000 BD_{45}	—	January 28, 2000	Kitt Peak	Spacewatch	NYS	2.1 km	MPC · JPL
103570	2000 BH_{49}	—	January 27, 2000	Kitt Peak	Spacewatch	·	3.1 km	MPC · JPL
103571	2000 BU_{49}	—	January 16, 2000	Kitt Peak	Spacewatch	·	1.3 km	MPC · JPL
103572	2000 BX_{50}	—	January 16, 2000	Kitt Peak	Spacewatch	·	2.8 km	MPC · JPL
103573	2000 BE_{51}	—	January 30, 2000	Kitt Peak	Spacewatch	THM	5.5 km	MPC · JPL
103574	2000 CR	—	February 3, 2000	Prescott	P. G. Comba	·	2.6 km	MPC · JPL
103575	2000 CS	—	February 3, 2000	Prescott	P. G. Comba	·	1.6 km	MPC · JPL
103576	2000 CG_{1}	—	February 4, 2000	Zeno	T. Stafford	·	2.1 km	MPC · JPL
103577	2000 CL_{1}	—	February 4, 2000	Višnjan Observatory	K. Korlević	·	3.1 km	MPC · JPL
103578	2000 CK_{3}	—	February 2, 2000	Socorro	LINEAR	(5)	3.3 km	MPC · JPL
103579	2000 CZ_{3}	—	February 2, 2000	Socorro	LINEAR	NYS	4.3 km	MPC · JPL
103580	2000 CF_{4}	—	February 2, 2000	Socorro	LINEAR	·	2.5 km	MPC · JPL
103581	2000 CO_{4}	—	February 2, 2000	Socorro	LINEAR	·	1.7 km	MPC · JPL
103582	2000 CQ_{4}	—	February 2, 2000	Socorro	LINEAR	·	2.3 km	MPC · JPL
103583	2000 CR_{5}	—	February 2, 2000	Socorro	LINEAR	·	5.1 km	MPC · JPL
103584	2000 CW_{5}	—	February 2, 2000	Socorro	LINEAR	·	4.0 km	MPC · JPL
103585	2000 CH_{7}	—	February 2, 2000	Socorro	LINEAR	·	5.1 km	MPC · JPL
103586	2000 CR_{7}	—	February 2, 2000	Socorro	LINEAR	TEL	2.5 km	MPC · JPL
103587	2000 CT_{7}	—	February 2, 2000	Socorro	LINEAR	·	1.3 km	MPC · JPL
103588	2000 CU_{7}	—	February 2, 2000	Socorro	LINEAR	·	3.5 km	MPC · JPL
103589	2000 CH_{8}	—	February 2, 2000	Socorro	LINEAR	·	1.8 km	MPC · JPL
103590	2000 CL_{8}	—	February 2, 2000	Socorro	LINEAR	·	2.2 km	MPC · JPL
103591	2000 CR_{8}	—	February 2, 2000	Socorro	LINEAR	GEF	2.2 km	MPC · JPL
103592	2000 CB_{9}	—	February 2, 2000	Socorro	LINEAR	·	1.9 km	MPC · JPL
103593	2000 CC_{10}	—	February 2, 2000	Socorro	LINEAR	MIS	4.8 km	MPC · JPL
103594	2000 CC_{11}	—	February 2, 2000	Socorro	LINEAR	·	4.8 km	MPC · JPL
103595	2000 CE_{11}	—	February 2, 2000	Socorro	LINEAR	·	2.1 km	MPC · JPL
103596	2000 CK_{12}	—	February 2, 2000	Socorro	LINEAR	·	3.1 km	MPC · JPL
103597	2000 CP_{14}	—	February 2, 2000	Socorro	LINEAR	NYS	1.9 km	MPC · JPL
103598	2000 CR_{14}	—	February 2, 2000	Socorro	LINEAR	·	2.7 km	MPC · JPL
103599	2000 CY_{14}	—	February 2, 2000	Socorro	LINEAR	MAS	1.4 km	MPC · JPL
103600	2000 CM_{16}	—	February 2, 2000	Socorro	LINEAR	·	2.6 km	MPC · JPL

== 103601–103700 ==
back to top

Designation			Discovery			Properties		Ref
Permanent	Provisional	Named after	Date	Site	Discoverer(s)	Category	Diam.	Ref
103601	2000 CP_{17}	—	February 2, 2000	Socorro	LINEAR	V	1.2 km	MPC · JPL
103602	2000 CU_{17}	—	February 2, 2000	Socorro	LINEAR	·	1.3 km	MPC · JPL
103603	2000 CG_{18}	—	February 2, 2000	Socorro	LINEAR	(5)	2.3 km	MPC · JPL
103604	2000 CH_{18}	—	February 2, 2000	Socorro	LINEAR	·	3.0 km	MPC · JPL
103605	2000 CM_{18}	—	February 2, 2000	Socorro	LINEAR	·	2.5 km	MPC · JPL
103606	2000 CR_{18}	—	February 2, 2000	Socorro	LINEAR	EUN	2.4 km	MPC · JPL
103607	2000 CE_{19}	—	February 2, 2000	Socorro	LINEAR	AEO	1.6 km	MPC · JPL
103608	2000 CR_{19}	—	February 2, 2000	Socorro	LINEAR	·	1.6 km	MPC · JPL
103609	2000 CE_{20}	—	February 2, 2000	Socorro	LINEAR	·	2.0 km	MPC · JPL
103610	2000 CS_{20}	—	February 2, 2000	Socorro	LINEAR	·	2.2 km	MPC · JPL
103611	2000 CW_{20}	—	February 2, 2000	Socorro	LINEAR	·	2.8 km	MPC · JPL
103612	2000 CD_{21}	—	February 2, 2000	Socorro	LINEAR	·	3.7 km	MPC · JPL
103613	2000 CM_{21}	—	February 2, 2000	Socorro	LINEAR	GEF	2.3 km	MPC · JPL
103614	2000 CF_{22}	—	February 2, 2000	Socorro	LINEAR	·	2.8 km	MPC · JPL
103615	2000 CQ_{22}	—	February 2, 2000	Socorro	LINEAR	·	3.9 km	MPC · JPL
103616	2000 CK_{23}	—	February 2, 2000	Socorro	LINEAR	·	1.5 km	MPC · JPL
103617	2000 CL_{23}	—	February 2, 2000	Socorro	LINEAR	·	4.1 km	MPC · JPL
103618	2000 CT_{23}	—	February 2, 2000	Socorro	LINEAR	·	2.9 km	MPC · JPL
103619	2000 CH_{24}	—	February 2, 2000	Socorro	LINEAR	·	2.0 km	MPC · JPL
103620	2000 CJ_{24}	—	February 2, 2000	Socorro	LINEAR	·	2.1 km	MPC · JPL
103621	2000 CA_{25}	—	February 2, 2000	Socorro	LINEAR	·	2.2 km	MPC · JPL
103622	2000 CR_{25}	—	February 2, 2000	Socorro	LINEAR	AEO	1.6 km	MPC · JPL
103623	2000 CN_{26}	—	February 2, 2000	Socorro	LINEAR	·	4.2 km	MPC · JPL
103624	2000 CF_{27}	—	February 2, 2000	Socorro	LINEAR	·	4.7 km	MPC · JPL
103625	2000 CY_{27}	—	February 2, 2000	Socorro	LINEAR	·	2.4 km	MPC · JPL
103626	2000 CH_{28}	—	February 2, 2000	Socorro	LINEAR	·	1.5 km	MPC · JPL
103627	2000 CL_{28}	—	February 2, 2000	Socorro	LINEAR	·	3.9 km	MPC · JPL
103628	2000 CB_{29}	—	February 2, 2000	Socorro	LINEAR	·	1.5 km	MPC · JPL
103629	2000 CN_{29}	—	February 2, 2000	Socorro	LINEAR	·	2.8 km	MPC · JPL
103630	2000 CS_{29}	—	February 2, 2000	Socorro	LINEAR	EOS	4.5 km	MPC · JPL
103631	2000 CL_{30}	—	February 2, 2000	Socorro	LINEAR	·	3.1 km	MPC · JPL
103632	2000 CP_{30}	—	February 2, 2000	Socorro	LINEAR	(5)	2.3 km	MPC · JPL
103633	2000 CW_{30}	—	February 2, 2000	Socorro	LINEAR	·	3.5 km	MPC · JPL
103634	2000 CA_{31}	—	February 2, 2000	Socorro	LINEAR	·	3.3 km	MPC · JPL
103635	2000 CT_{31}	—	February 2, 2000	Socorro	LINEAR	MRX	2.0 km	MPC · JPL
103636	2000 CW_{31}	—	February 2, 2000	Socorro	LINEAR	·	1.5 km	MPC · JPL
103637	2000 CF_{32}	—	February 2, 2000	Socorro	LINEAR	·	4.8 km	MPC · JPL
103638	2000 CJ_{32}	—	February 2, 2000	Socorro	LINEAR	EUN	3.9 km	MPC · JPL
103639	2000 CP_{33}	—	February 2, 2000	Oaxaca	Roe, J. M.	JUN	2.8 km	MPC · JPL
103640	2000 CQ_{33}	—	February 4, 2000	Višnjan Observatory	K. Korlević	·	5.6 km	MPC · JPL
103641	2000 CV_{33}	—	February 4, 2000	Višnjan Observatory	K. Korlević	·	3.1 km	MPC · JPL
103642	2000 CG_{34}	—	February 5, 2000	Višnjan Observatory	K. Korlević	V	1.3 km	MPC · JPL
103643	2000 CW_{34}	—	February 2, 2000	Socorro	LINEAR	·	7.6 km	MPC · JPL
103644	2000 CK_{35}	—	February 2, 2000	Socorro	LINEAR	·	2.0 km	MPC · JPL
103645	2000 CP_{35}	—	February 2, 2000	Socorro	LINEAR	·	6.4 km	MPC · JPL
103646	2000 CD_{36}	—	February 2, 2000	Socorro	LINEAR	·	4.3 km	MPC · JPL
103647	2000 CH_{36}	—	February 2, 2000	Socorro	LINEAR	·	2.3 km	MPC · JPL
103648	2000 CG_{37}	—	February 2, 2000	Socorro	LINEAR	·	3.7 km	MPC · JPL
103649	2000 CJ_{37}	—	February 3, 2000	Socorro	LINEAR	·	1.8 km	MPC · JPL
103650	2000 CL_{37}	—	February 3, 2000	Socorro	LINEAR	·	1.4 km	MPC · JPL
103651	2000 CJ_{38}	—	February 3, 2000	Socorro	LINEAR	·	1.9 km	MPC · JPL
103652	2000 CP_{38}	—	February 3, 2000	Socorro	LINEAR	THM	3.8 km	MPC · JPL
103653	2000 CR_{39}	—	February 5, 2000	Višnjan Observatory	K. Korlević	·	1.5 km	MPC · JPL
103654	2000 CX_{40}	—	February 2, 2000	Catalina	CSS	·	1.9 km	MPC · JPL
103655	2000 CC_{41}	—	February 6, 2000	Prescott	P. G. Comba	·	1.8 km	MPC · JPL
103656	2000 CV_{41}	—	February 2, 2000	Socorro	LINEAR	·	2.7 km	MPC · JPL
103657	2000 CW_{41}	—	February 2, 2000	Socorro	LINEAR	·	2.6 km	MPC · JPL
103658	2000 CL_{42}	—	February 2, 2000	Socorro	LINEAR	·	2.2 km	MPC · JPL
103659	2000 CS_{45}	—	February 2, 2000	Socorro	LINEAR	·	3.0 km	MPC · JPL
103660	2000 CJ_{46}	—	February 2, 2000	Socorro	LINEAR	MAS	1.4 km	MPC · JPL
103661	2000 CK_{46}	—	February 2, 2000	Socorro	LINEAR	·	1.6 km	MPC · JPL
103662	2000 CM_{46}	—	February 2, 2000	Socorro	LINEAR	·	1.6 km	MPC · JPL
103663	2000 CC_{47}	—	February 2, 2000	Socorro	LINEAR	·	5.0 km	MPC · JPL
103664	2000 CK_{48}	—	February 2, 2000	Socorro	LINEAR	DOR	4.7 km	MPC · JPL
103665	2000 CZ_{48}	—	February 2, 2000	Socorro	LINEAR	·	3.4 km	MPC · JPL
103666	2000 CU_{49}	—	February 2, 2000	Socorro	LINEAR	·	5.4 km	MPC · JPL
103667	2000 CB_{50}	—	February 2, 2000	Socorro	LINEAR	·	4.5 km	MPC · JPL
103668	2000 CB_{51}	—	February 2, 2000	Socorro	LINEAR	·	6.8 km	MPC · JPL
103669	2000 CW_{51}	—	February 2, 2000	Socorro	LINEAR	·	2.4 km	MPC · JPL
103670	2000 CD_{52}	—	February 2, 2000	Socorro	LINEAR	THM	5.4 km	MPC · JPL
103671	2000 CP_{54}	—	February 2, 2000	Socorro	LINEAR	MIS	5.9 km	MPC · JPL
103672	2000 CB_{55}	—	February 3, 2000	Socorro	LINEAR	·	3.2 km	MPC · JPL
103673	2000 CZ_{55}	—	February 4, 2000	Socorro	LINEAR	·	4.7 km	MPC · JPL
103674	2000 CU_{58}	—	February 2, 2000	Socorro	LINEAR	H	1.5 km	MPC · JPL
103675	2000 CP_{59}	—	February 2, 2000	Socorro	LINEAR	·	1.9 km	MPC · JPL
103676	2000 CQ_{59}	—	February 2, 2000	Socorro	LINEAR	·	2.7 km	MPC · JPL
103677	2000 CT_{59}	—	February 2, 2000	Socorro	LINEAR	·	6.1 km	MPC · JPL
103678	2000 CY_{59}	—	February 2, 2000	Socorro	LINEAR	·	5.3 km	MPC · JPL
103679	2000 CL_{61}	—	February 2, 2000	Socorro	LINEAR	·	4.5 km	MPC · JPL
103680	2000 CP_{61}	—	February 2, 2000	Socorro	LINEAR	·	3.3 km	MPC · JPL
103681	2000 CN_{62}	—	February 2, 2000	Socorro	LINEAR	·	4.3 km	MPC · JPL
103682	2000 CY_{62}	—	February 2, 2000	Socorro	LINEAR	·	2.9 km	MPC · JPL
103683	2000 CK_{64}	—	February 3, 2000	Socorro	LINEAR	·	3.0 km	MPC · JPL
103684	2000 CF_{65}	—	February 3, 2000	Socorro	LINEAR	·	2.3 km	MPC · JPL
103685	2000 CB_{66}	—	February 6, 2000	Socorro	LINEAR	MRX	2.4 km	MPC · JPL
103686	2000 CX_{66}	—	February 6, 2000	Socorro	LINEAR	·	1.3 km	MPC · JPL
103687	2000 CL_{68}	—	February 1, 2000	Kitt Peak	Spacewatch	·	3.2 km	MPC · JPL
103688	2000 CS_{68}	—	February 1, 2000	Kitt Peak	Spacewatch	MAS	1.4 km	MPC · JPL
103689	2000 CK_{69}	—	February 1, 2000	Kitt Peak	Spacewatch	·	3.9 km	MPC · JPL
103690	2000 CM_{71}	—	February 7, 2000	Socorro	LINEAR	NYS	2.9 km	MPC · JPL
103691	2000 CG_{72}	—	February 7, 2000	Kitt Peak	Spacewatch	KOR	1.9 km	MPC · JPL
103692	2000 CJ_{72}	—	February 3, 2000	Višnjan Observatory	K. Korlević	·	3.2 km	MPC · JPL
103693	2000 CY_{72}	—	February 2, 2000	Socorro	LINEAR	(5)	3.1 km	MPC · JPL
103694	2000 CP_{73}	—	February 7, 2000	Kitt Peak	Spacewatch	·	2.3 km	MPC · JPL
103695	2000 CL_{75}	—	February 5, 2000	Socorro	LINEAR	PHO	2.6 km	MPC · JPL
103696	2000 CP_{75}	—	February 6, 2000	Socorro	LINEAR	·	3.2 km	MPC · JPL
103697	2000 CB_{76}	—	February 8, 2000	Socorro	LINEAR	V	1.7 km	MPC · JPL
103698	2000 CH_{77}	—	February 10, 2000	Višnjan Observatory	K. Korlević	·	6.5 km	MPC · JPL
103699	2000 CS_{77}	—	February 7, 2000	Kitt Peak	Spacewatch	·	1.0 km	MPC · JPL
103700	2000 CC_{78}	—	February 7, 2000	Kitt Peak	Spacewatch	PAD	4.1 km	MPC · JPL

== 103701–103800 ==
back to top

Designation			Discovery			Properties		Ref
Permanent	Provisional	Named after	Date	Site	Discoverer(s)	Category	Diam.	Ref
103701	2000 CL_{78}	—	February 7, 2000	Kitt Peak	Spacewatch	·	2.3 km	MPC · JPL
103702	2000 CZ_{78}	—	February 8, 2000	Kitt Peak	Spacewatch	·	3.9 km	MPC · JPL
103703	2000 CZ_{81}	—	February 4, 2000	Socorro	LINEAR	·	2.0 km	MPC · JPL
103704	2000 CH_{82}	—	February 4, 2000	Socorro	LINEAR	·	2.6 km	MPC · JPL
103705	2000 CW_{82}	—	February 4, 2000	Socorro	LINEAR	·	2.5 km	MPC · JPL
103706	2000 CS_{83}	—	February 4, 2000	Socorro	LINEAR	·	3.1 km	MPC · JPL
103707	2000 CW_{83}	—	February 4, 2000	Socorro	LINEAR	THM	7.0 km	MPC · JPL
103708	2000 CD_{84}	—	February 4, 2000	Socorro	LINEAR	·	4.4 km	MPC · JPL
103709	2000 CF_{84}	—	February 4, 2000	Socorro	LINEAR	·	1.7 km	MPC · JPL
103710	2000 CT_{86}	—	February 4, 2000	Socorro	LINEAR	·	3.8 km	MPC · JPL
103711	2000 CV_{86}	—	February 4, 2000	Socorro	LINEAR	·	3.7 km	MPC · JPL
103712	2000 CP_{87}	—	February 4, 2000	Socorro	LINEAR	·	5.3 km	MPC · JPL
103713	2000 CZ_{87}	—	February 4, 2000	Socorro	LINEAR	MAS	1.6 km	MPC · JPL
103714	2000 CO_{89}	—	February 4, 2000	Socorro	LINEAR	NYS	2.5 km	MPC · JPL
103715	2000 CA_{91}	—	February 6, 2000	Socorro	LINEAR	·	3.3 km	MPC · JPL
103716	2000 CK_{91}	—	February 6, 2000	Socorro	LINEAR	·	4.1 km	MPC · JPL
103717	2000 CS_{91}	—	February 6, 2000	Socorro	LINEAR	·	5.3 km	MPC · JPL
103718	2000 CV_{92}	—	February 6, 2000	Socorro	LINEAR	·	3.1 km	MPC · JPL
103719	2000 CV_{93}	—	February 8, 2000	Socorro	LINEAR	·	4.1 km	MPC · JPL
103720	2000 CF_{95}	—	February 8, 2000	Socorro	LINEAR	PHO	3.7 km	MPC · JPL
103721	2000 CV_{95}	—	February 10, 2000	Kitt Peak	Spacewatch	·	1.4 km	MPC · JPL
103722	2000 CL_{96}	—	February 11, 2000	Kitt Peak	Spacewatch	·	1.6 km	MPC · JPL
103723	2000 CN_{96}	—	February 11, 2000	Kitt Peak	Spacewatch	·	1.8 km	MPC · JPL
103724	2000 CW_{96}	—	February 6, 2000	Socorro	LINEAR	·	2.2 km	MPC · JPL
103725	2000 CF_{98}	—	February 7, 2000	Kitt Peak	Spacewatch	·	4.2 km	MPC · JPL
103726	2000 CR_{98}	—	February 8, 2000	Kitt Peak	Spacewatch	·	2.7 km	MPC · JPL
103727	2000 CF_{99}	—	February 8, 2000	Kitt Peak	Spacewatch	·	3.7 km	MPC · JPL
103728	2000 CZ_{99}	—	February 10, 2000	Kitt Peak	Spacewatch	KOR	2.3 km	MPC · JPL
103729	2000 CW_{100}	—	February 12, 2000	Kitt Peak	Spacewatch	·	2.4 km	MPC · JPL
103730	2000 CJ_{102}	—	February 2, 2000	Socorro	LINEAR	NYS	2.4 km	MPC · JPL
103731	2000 CK_{102}	—	February 2, 2000	Socorro	LINEAR	NYS	2.0 km	MPC · JPL
103732	2000 CO_{103}	—	February 8, 2000	Socorro	LINEAR	·	2.5 km	MPC · JPL
103733 Bernardharris	2000 CD_{105}	Bernardharris	February 5, 2000	Kitt Peak	M. W. Buie	·	1.4 km	MPC · JPL
103734 Winstonscott	2000 CO_{106}	Winstonscott	February 5, 2000	Kitt Peak	M. W. Buie	·	2.7 km	MPC · JPL
103735	2000 CH_{108}	—	February 5, 2000	Catalina	CSS	·	3.3 km	MPC · JPL
103736	2000 CQ_{108}	—	February 5, 2000	Catalina	CSS	·	2.9 km	MPC · JPL
103737 Curbeam	2000 CU_{108}	Curbeam	February 5, 2000	Kitt Peak	M. W. Buie	·	3.4 km	MPC · JPL
103738 Stephaniewilson	2000 CA_{110}	Stephaniewilson	February 5, 2000	Kitt Peak	M. W. Buie	·	2.6 km	MPC · JPL
103739 Higginbotham	2000 CT_{110}	Higginbotham	February 6, 2000	Kitt Peak	M. W. Buie	·	5.0 km	MPC · JPL
103740 Budinger	2000 CV_{110}	Budinger	February 6, 2000	Kitt Peak	Millis, R.	AST	4.9 km	MPC · JPL
103741	2000 CA_{112}	—	February 7, 2000	Catalina	CSS	·	4.4 km	MPC · JPL
103742	2000 CP_{112}	—	February 7, 2000	Catalina	CSS	·	1.1 km	MPC · JPL
103743	2000 CS_{112}	—	February 7, 2000	Catalina	CSS	·	5.2 km	MPC · JPL
103744	2000 CV_{112}	—	February 7, 2000	Catalina	CSS	·	2.3 km	MPC · JPL
103745	2000 CC_{113}	—	February 8, 2000	Kitt Peak	Spacewatch	·	2.4 km	MPC · JPL
103746	2000 CK_{113}	—	February 10, 2000	Kitt Peak	Spacewatch	V	1.6 km	MPC · JPL
103747	2000 CT_{114}	—	February 1, 2000	Catalina	CSS	·	3.1 km	MPC · JPL
103748	2000 CE_{115}	—	February 2, 2000	Socorro	LINEAR	·	1.5 km	MPC · JPL
103749	2000 CO_{115}	—	February 3, 2000	Socorro	LINEAR	·	1.8 km	MPC · JPL
103750	2000 CZ_{116}	—	February 3, 2000	Socorro	LINEAR	·	4.9 km	MPC · JPL
103751	2000 CE_{117}	—	February 2, 2000	Socorro	LINEAR	MAS	1.5 km	MPC · JPL
103752	2000 CM_{117}	—	February 3, 2000	Socorro	LINEAR	·	2.4 km	MPC · JPL
103753	2000 CA_{118}	—	February 3, 2000	Socorro	LINEAR	·	3.7 km	MPC · JPL
103754	2000 CP_{122}	—	February 3, 2000	Socorro	LINEAR	·	3.4 km	MPC · JPL
103755	2000 CY_{123}	—	February 3, 2000	Socorro	LINEAR	·	1.7 km	MPC · JPL
103756	2000 CH_{124}	—	February 3, 2000	Socorro	LINEAR	·	5.2 km	MPC · JPL
103757	2000 CJ_{124}	—	February 3, 2000	Socorro	LINEAR	slow	7.7 km	MPC · JPL
103758	2000 CF_{125}	—	February 3, 2000	Socorro	LINEAR	NYS	2.4 km	MPC · JPL
103759	2000 CG_{125}	—	February 3, 2000	Socorro	LINEAR	·	1.6 km	MPC · JPL
103760	2000 CV_{125}	—	February 3, 2000	Socorro	LINEAR	·	2.5 km	MPC · JPL
103761	2000 CV_{129}	—	February 3, 2000	Kitt Peak	Spacewatch	·	1.2 km	MPC · JPL
103762	2000 CP_{131}	—	February 3, 2000	Kitt Peak	Spacewatch	KOR	1.8 km	MPC · JPL
103763	2000 CP_{136}	—	February 3, 2000	Kitt Peak	Spacewatch	·	1.6 km	MPC · JPL
103764	2000 CY_{139}	—	February 4, 2000	Kitt Peak	Spacewatch	KOR	2.4 km	MPC · JPL
103765	2000 CZ_{139}	—	February 4, 2000	Kitt Peak	Spacewatch	·	2.9 km	MPC · JPL
103766	2000 CY_{141}	—	February 3, 2000	Socorro	LINEAR	AGN	2.2 km	MPC · JPL
103767	2000 CK_{147}	—	February 2, 2000	Kitt Peak	Spacewatch	(16286)	2.6 km	MPC · JPL
103768	2000 DO	—	February 23, 2000	Višnjan Observatory	K. Korlević	DOR	4.0 km	MPC · JPL
103769	2000 DV	—	February 24, 2000	Oizumi	T. Kobayashi	·	2.8 km	MPC · JPL
103770 Wilfriedlang	2000 DP_{1}	Wilfriedlang	February 26, 2000	Drebach	J. Kandler, G. Lehmann	·	5.0 km	MPC · JPL
103771	2000 DZ_{1}	—	February 26, 2000	Kitt Peak	Spacewatch	·	3.4 km	MPC · JPL
103772	2000 DD_{2}	—	February 26, 2000	Kitt Peak	Spacewatch	·	2.5 km	MPC · JPL
103773	2000 DH_{2}	—	February 26, 2000	Kitt Peak	Spacewatch	·	1.2 km	MPC · JPL
103774	2000 DA_{4}	—	February 28, 2000	Socorro	LINEAR	·	5.3 km	MPC · JPL
103775	2000 DK_{4}	—	February 28, 2000	Socorro	LINEAR	·	3.2 km	MPC · JPL
103776	2000 DV_{4}	—	February 28, 2000	Socorro	LINEAR	·	3.5 km	MPC · JPL
103777	2000 DG_{5}	—	February 28, 2000	Socorro	LINEAR	·	4.6 km	MPC · JPL
103778	2000 DH_{5}	—	February 28, 2000	Socorro	LINEAR	·	1.6 km	MPC · JPL
103779	2000 DN_{5}	—	February 24, 2000	Socorro	LINEAR	·	3.9 km	MPC · JPL
103780	2000 DO_{5}	—	February 25, 2000	Socorro	LINEAR	NYS	3.2 km	MPC · JPL
103781	2000 DZ_{6}	—	February 29, 2000	Oaxaca	Roe, J. M.	·	2.0 km	MPC · JPL
103782	2000 DJ_{7}	—	February 29, 2000	Oizumi	T. Kobayashi	·	1.7 km	MPC · JPL
103783	2000 DZ_{7}	—	February 28, 2000	Kitt Peak	Spacewatch	NYS	2.6 km	MPC · JPL
103784	2000 DA_{8}	—	February 28, 2000	Kitt Peak	Spacewatch	·	3.3 km	MPC · JPL
103785	2000 DQ_{8}	—	February 27, 2000	Rock Finder	W. K. Y. Yeung	MAS	1.3 km	MPC · JPL
103786	2000 DY_{8}	—	February 26, 2000	Kitt Peak	Spacewatch	NYS	2.1 km	MPC · JPL
103787	2000 DL_{9}	—	February 26, 2000	Kitt Peak	Spacewatch	NYS	2.0 km	MPC · JPL
103788	2000 DA_{10}	—	February 26, 2000	Kitt Peak	Spacewatch	·	4.6 km	MPC · JPL
103789	2000 DL_{10}	—	February 26, 2000	Kitt Peak	Spacewatch	·	3.0 km	MPC · JPL
103790	2000 DY_{10}	—	February 26, 2000	Kitt Peak	Spacewatch	V	1.2 km	MPC · JPL
103791	2000 DB_{11}	—	February 26, 2000	Kitt Peak	Spacewatch	·	3.4 km	MPC · JPL
103792	2000 DE_{11}	—	February 26, 2000	Kitt Peak	Spacewatch	·	2.0 km	MPC · JPL
103793	2000 DK_{11}	—	February 27, 2000	Kitt Peak	Spacewatch	·	4.0 km	MPC · JPL
103794	2000 DG_{12}	—	February 27, 2000	Kitt Peak	Spacewatch	·	2.7 km	MPC · JPL
103795	2000 DO_{12}	—	February 27, 2000	Kitt Peak	Spacewatch	·	2.6 km	MPC · JPL
103796	2000 DQ_{12}	—	February 27, 2000	Kitt Peak	Spacewatch	(12739)	3.0 km	MPC · JPL
103797	2000 DR_{12}	—	February 27, 2000	Kitt Peak	Spacewatch	·	3.3 km	MPC · JPL
103798	2000 DH_{13}	—	February 28, 2000	Kitt Peak	Spacewatch	·	2.0 km	MPC · JPL
103799	2000 DN_{13}	—	February 28, 2000	Kitt Peak	Spacewatch	NYS	1.8 km	MPC · JPL
103800	2000 DO_{13}	—	February 28, 2000	Kitt Peak	Spacewatch	·	1.8 km	MPC · JPL

== 103801–103900 ==
back to top

Designation			Discovery			Properties		Ref
Permanent	Provisional	Named after	Date	Site	Discoverer(s)	Category	Diam.	Ref
103801	2000 DY_{13}	—	February 28, 2000	Kitt Peak	Spacewatch	·	3.2 km	MPC · JPL
103802	2000 DH_{14}	—	February 28, 2000	Kitt Peak	Spacewatch	THM	3.8 km	MPC · JPL
103803	2000 DJ_{17}	—	February 29, 2000	Socorro	LINEAR	H	1.3 km	MPC · JPL
103804	2000 DU_{17}	—	February 26, 2000	Kitt Peak	Spacewatch	·	4.9 km	MPC · JPL
103805	2000 DV_{17}	—	February 26, 2000	Kitt Peak	Spacewatch	·	2.3 km	MPC · JPL
103806	2000 DZ_{17}	—	February 25, 2000	Siding Spring	R. H. McNaught	·	3.3 km	MPC · JPL
103807	2000 DM_{18}	—	February 28, 2000	Socorro	LINEAR	·	2.1 km	MPC · JPL
103808	2000 DN_{18}	—	February 28, 2000	Socorro	LINEAR	·	2.5 km	MPC · JPL
103809	2000 DB_{19}	—	February 29, 2000	Socorro	LINEAR	NYS	2.2 km	MPC · JPL
103810	2000 DD_{19}	—	February 29, 2000	Socorro	LINEAR	V	1.3 km	MPC · JPL
103811	2000 DE_{19}	—	February 29, 2000	Socorro	LINEAR	MRX	1.5 km	MPC · JPL
103812	2000 DK_{19}	—	February 29, 2000	Socorro	LINEAR	·	4.4 km	MPC · JPL
103813	2000 DO_{19}	—	February 29, 2000	Socorro	LINEAR	·	3.0 km	MPC · JPL
103814	2000 DW_{19}	—	February 29, 2000	Socorro	LINEAR	·	3.5 km	MPC · JPL
103815	2000 DE_{20}	—	February 29, 2000	Socorro	LINEAR	·	3.9 km	MPC · JPL
103816	2000 DL_{20}	—	February 29, 2000	Socorro	LINEAR	·	3.4 km	MPC · JPL
103817	2000 DW_{20}	—	February 29, 2000	Socorro	LINEAR	·	2.8 km	MPC · JPL
103818	2000 DY_{20}	—	February 29, 2000	Socorro	LINEAR	GEF	2.0 km	MPC · JPL
103819	2000 DL_{21}	—	February 29, 2000	Socorro	LINEAR	·	3.4 km	MPC · JPL
103820	2000 DN_{22}	—	February 29, 2000	Socorro	LINEAR	·	3.2 km	MPC · JPL
103821	2000 DE_{23}	—	February 29, 2000	Socorro	LINEAR	·	4.4 km	MPC · JPL
103822	2000 DQ_{23}	—	February 29, 2000	Socorro	LINEAR	·	1.5 km	MPC · JPL
103823	2000 DC_{24}	—	February 29, 2000	Socorro	LINEAR	·	5.3 km	MPC · JPL
103824	2000 DE_{24}	—	February 29, 2000	Socorro	LINEAR	NYS	2.8 km	MPC · JPL
103825	2000 DR_{24}	—	February 29, 2000	Socorro	LINEAR	·	1.3 km	MPC · JPL
103826	2000 DV_{24}	—	February 29, 2000	Socorro	LINEAR	·	4.5 km	MPC · JPL
103827	2000 DH_{25}	—	February 29, 2000	Socorro	LINEAR	·	2.6 km	MPC · JPL
103828	2000 DC_{26}	—	February 29, 2000	Socorro	LINEAR	·	1.7 km	MPC · JPL
103829	2000 DZ_{26}	—	February 29, 2000	Socorro	LINEAR	·	3.0 km	MPC · JPL
103830	2000 DL_{27}	—	February 29, 2000	Socorro	LINEAR	·	3.8 km	MPC · JPL
103831	2000 DO_{27}	—	February 29, 2000	Socorro	LINEAR	AGN	2.1 km	MPC · JPL
103832	2000 DV_{27}	—	February 29, 2000	Socorro	LINEAR	·	1.1 km	MPC · JPL
103833	2000 DP_{28}	—	February 29, 2000	Socorro	LINEAR	·	3.9 km	MPC · JPL
103834	2000 DY_{28}	—	February 29, 2000	Socorro	LINEAR	·	2.0 km	MPC · JPL
103835	2000 DG_{29}	—	February 29, 2000	Socorro	LINEAR	·	2.3 km	MPC · JPL
103836	2000 DU_{29}	—	February 29, 2000	Socorro	LINEAR	NYS	1.7 km	MPC · JPL
103837	2000 DX_{29}	—	February 29, 2000	Socorro	LINEAR	·	1.6 km	MPC · JPL
103838	2000 DN_{31}	—	February 29, 2000	Socorro	LINEAR	(43176)	3.7 km	MPC · JPL
103839	2000 DN_{32}	—	February 29, 2000	Socorro	LINEAR	·	3.8 km	MPC · JPL
103840	2000 DU_{32}	—	February 29, 2000	Socorro	LINEAR	·	3.0 km	MPC · JPL
103841	2000 DM_{33}	—	February 29, 2000	Socorro	LINEAR	·	1.5 km	MPC · JPL
103842	2000 DQ_{33}	—	February 29, 2000	Socorro	LINEAR	(2076)	2.3 km	MPC · JPL
103843	2000 DZ_{33}	—	February 29, 2000	Socorro	LINEAR	·	3.7 km	MPC · JPL
103844	2000 DC_{34}	—	February 29, 2000	Socorro	LINEAR	·	3.3 km	MPC · JPL
103845	2000 DF_{34}	—	February 29, 2000	Socorro	LINEAR	·	4.8 km	MPC · JPL
103846	2000 DQ_{34}	—	February 29, 2000	Socorro	LINEAR	·	2.4 km	MPC · JPL
103847	2000 DW_{34}	—	February 29, 2000	Socorro	LINEAR	·	4.0 km	MPC · JPL
103848	2000 DE_{35}	—	February 29, 2000	Socorro	LINEAR	·	1.9 km	MPC · JPL
103849	2000 DK_{35}	—	February 29, 2000	Socorro	LINEAR	·	6.9 km	MPC · JPL
103850	2000 DS_{35}	—	February 29, 2000	Socorro	LINEAR	KOR	3.1 km	MPC · JPL
103851	2000 DW_{35}	—	February 29, 2000	Socorro	LINEAR	THM	4.7 km	MPC · JPL
103852	2000 DH_{36}	—	February 29, 2000	Socorro	LINEAR	KOR	2.5 km	MPC · JPL
103853	2000 DX_{36}	—	February 29, 2000	Socorro	LINEAR	V	2.0 km	MPC · JPL
103854	2000 DJ_{37}	—	February 29, 2000	Socorro	LINEAR	·	2.1 km	MPC · JPL
103855	2000 DP_{37}	—	February 29, 2000	Socorro	LINEAR	KOR	2.4 km	MPC · JPL
103856	2000 DA_{38}	—	February 29, 2000	Socorro	LINEAR	·	2.7 km	MPC · JPL
103857	2000 DG_{39}	—	February 29, 2000	Socorro	LINEAR	·	3.7 km	MPC · JPL
103858	2000 DH_{39}	—	February 29, 2000	Socorro	LINEAR	ANF	2.7 km	MPC · JPL
103859	2000 DX_{39}	—	February 29, 2000	Socorro	LINEAR	·	4.2 km	MPC · JPL
103860	2000 DN_{40}	—	February 29, 2000	Socorro	LINEAR	GEF	2.3 km	MPC · JPL
103861	2000 DS_{40}	—	February 29, 2000	Socorro	LINEAR	·	2.8 km	MPC · JPL
103862	2000 DW_{40}	—	February 29, 2000	Socorro	LINEAR	·	2.5 km	MPC · JPL
103863	2000 DR_{41}	—	February 29, 2000	Socorro	LINEAR	·	4.2 km	MPC · JPL
103864	2000 DX_{41}	—	February 29, 2000	Socorro	LINEAR	·	3.2 km	MPC · JPL
103865	2000 DY_{42}	—	February 29, 2000	Socorro	LINEAR	·	4.1 km	MPC · JPL
103866	2000 DA_{43}	—	February 29, 2000	Socorro	LINEAR	·	3.3 km	MPC · JPL
103867	2000 DC_{43}	—	February 29, 2000	Socorro	LINEAR	KOR	2.7 km	MPC · JPL
103868	2000 DV_{43}	—	February 29, 2000	Socorro	LINEAR	·	2.8 km	MPC · JPL
103869	2000 DC_{44}	—	February 29, 2000	Socorro	LINEAR	ERI	3.1 km	MPC · JPL
103870	2000 DJ_{44}	—	February 29, 2000	Socorro	LINEAR	·	4.3 km	MPC · JPL
103871	2000 DK_{45}	—	February 29, 2000	Socorro	LINEAR	·	4.1 km	MPC · JPL
103872	2000 DT_{45}	—	February 29, 2000	Socorro	LINEAR	·	3.0 km	MPC · JPL
103873	2000 DD_{46}	—	February 29, 2000	Socorro	LINEAR	·	4.2 km	MPC · JPL
103874	2000 DG_{46}	—	February 29, 2000	Socorro	LINEAR	·	2.5 km	MPC · JPL
103875	2000 DR_{47}	—	February 29, 2000	Socorro	LINEAR	·	1.8 km	MPC · JPL
103876	2000 DS_{47}	—	February 29, 2000	Socorro	LINEAR	CLA	2.5 km	MPC · JPL
103877	2000 DF_{48}	—	February 29, 2000	Socorro	LINEAR	·	3.1 km	MPC · JPL
103878	2000 DH_{48}	—	February 29, 2000	Socorro	LINEAR	·	2.5 km	MPC · JPL
103879	2000 DZ_{48}	—	February 29, 2000	Socorro	LINEAR	MAR	3.1 km	MPC · JPL
103880	2000 DG_{49}	—	February 29, 2000	Socorro	LINEAR	·	2.3 km	MPC · JPL
103881	2000 DS_{49}	—	February 29, 2000	Socorro	LINEAR	EOS	3.3 km	MPC · JPL
103882	2000 DE_{50}	—	February 29, 2000	Socorro	LINEAR	·	1.3 km	MPC · JPL
103883	2000 DP_{50}	—	February 29, 2000	Socorro	LINEAR	NYS	2.1 km	MPC · JPL
103884	2000 DB_{51}	—	February 29, 2000	Socorro	LINEAR	·	2.7 km	MPC · JPL
103885	2000 DH_{51}	—	February 29, 2000	Socorro	LINEAR	KOR	2.4 km	MPC · JPL
103886	2000 DP_{51}	—	February 29, 2000	Socorro	LINEAR	·	5.3 km	MPC · JPL
103887	2000 DO_{52}	—	February 29, 2000	Socorro	LINEAR	·	1.9 km	MPC · JPL
103888	2000 DP_{52}	—	February 29, 2000	Socorro	LINEAR	KOR	3.1 km	MPC · JPL
103889	2000 DS_{52}	—	February 29, 2000	Socorro	LINEAR	·	2.7 km	MPC · JPL
103890	2000 DY_{52}	—	February 29, 2000	Socorro	LINEAR	PHO	2.0 km	MPC · JPL
103891	2000 DJ_{53}	—	February 29, 2000	Socorro	LINEAR	NYS	2.2 km	MPC · JPL
103892	2000 DM_{54}	—	February 29, 2000	Socorro	LINEAR	·	3.4 km	MPC · JPL
103893	2000 DR_{54}	—	February 29, 2000	Socorro	LINEAR	·	3.6 km	MPC · JPL
103894	2000 DB_{55}	—	February 29, 2000	Socorro	LINEAR	·	4.1 km	MPC · JPL
103895	2000 DF_{55}	—	February 29, 2000	Socorro	LINEAR	·	4.4 km	MPC · JPL
103896	2000 DN_{55}	—	February 29, 2000	Socorro	LINEAR	KOR	2.8 km	MPC · JPL
103897	2000 DS_{55}	—	February 29, 2000	Socorro	LINEAR	·	3.2 km	MPC · JPL
103898	2000 DT_{55}	—	February 29, 2000	Socorro	LINEAR	·	2.8 km	MPC · JPL
103899	2000 DG_{56}	—	February 29, 2000	Socorro	LINEAR	(5)	2.2 km	MPC · JPL
103900	2000 DM_{56}	—	February 29, 2000	Socorro	LINEAR	·	2.8 km	MPC · JPL

== 103901–104000 ==
back to top

Designation			Discovery			Properties		Ref
Permanent	Provisional	Named after	Date	Site	Discoverer(s)	Category	Diam.	Ref
103901	2000 DP_{56}	—	February 29, 2000	Socorro	LINEAR	NYS	1.5 km	MPC · JPL
103902	2000 DR_{56}	—	February 29, 2000	Socorro	LINEAR	PHO	2.2 km	MPC · JPL
103903	2000 DX_{56}	—	February 29, 2000	Socorro	LINEAR	·	3.3 km	MPC · JPL
103904	2000 DG_{57}	—	February 29, 2000	Socorro	LINEAR	·	2.2 km	MPC · JPL
103905	2000 DA_{58}	—	February 29, 2000	Socorro	LINEAR	·	2.6 km	MPC · JPL
103906	2000 DJ_{58}	—	February 29, 2000	Socorro	LINEAR	·	3.7 km	MPC · JPL
103907	2000 DW_{58}	—	February 29, 2000	Socorro	LINEAR	EOS ·	6.9 km	MPC · JPL
103908	2000 DO_{59}	—	February 29, 2000	Socorro	LINEAR	·	5.8 km	MPC · JPL
103909	2000 DQ_{59}	—	February 29, 2000	Socorro	LINEAR	MAS	1.4 km	MPC · JPL
103910	2000 DS_{59}	—	February 29, 2000	Socorro	LINEAR	MRX · fast	1.6 km	MPC · JPL
103911	2000 DW_{59}	—	February 29, 2000	Socorro	LINEAR	·	2.2 km	MPC · JPL
103912	2000 DA_{60}	—	February 29, 2000	Socorro	LINEAR	·	3.5 km	MPC · JPL
103913	2000 DN_{60}	—	February 29, 2000	Socorro	LINEAR	·	4.4 km	MPC · JPL
103914	2000 DR_{60}	—	February 29, 2000	Socorro	LINEAR	·	2.6 km	MPC · JPL
103915	2000 DZ_{60}	—	February 29, 2000	Socorro	LINEAR	·	4.0 km	MPC · JPL
103916	2000 DL_{61}	—	February 29, 2000	Socorro	LINEAR	KOR	2.3 km	MPC · JPL
103917	2000 DS_{61}	—	February 29, 2000	Socorro	LINEAR	·	1.8 km	MPC · JPL
103918	2000 DG_{62}	—	February 29, 2000	Socorro	LINEAR	MAR	2.6 km	MPC · JPL
103919	2000 DJ_{62}	—	February 29, 2000	Socorro	LINEAR	·	8.0 km	MPC · JPL
103920	2000 DM_{62}	—	February 29, 2000	Socorro	LINEAR	·	1.8 km	MPC · JPL
103921	2000 DN_{62}	—	February 29, 2000	Socorro	LINEAR	·	5.1 km	MPC · JPL
103922	2000 DO_{62}	—	February 29, 2000	Socorro	LINEAR	·	4.7 km	MPC · JPL
103923	2000 DP_{62}	—	February 29, 2000	Socorro	LINEAR	·	3.6 km	MPC · JPL
103924	2000 DC_{63}	—	February 29, 2000	Socorro	LINEAR	NAE	6.0 km	MPC · JPL
103925	2000 DJ_{63}	—	February 29, 2000	Socorro	LINEAR	PAD	5.0 km	MPC · JPL
103926	2000 DR_{63}	—	February 29, 2000	Socorro	LINEAR	·	5.8 km	MPC · JPL
103927	2000 DA_{64}	—	February 29, 2000	Socorro	LINEAR	·	4.0 km	MPC · JPL
103928	2000 DL_{64}	—	February 29, 2000	Socorro	LINEAR	·	3.8 km	MPC · JPL
103929	2000 DU_{64}	—	February 29, 2000	Socorro	LINEAR	·	4.4 km	MPC · JPL
103930	2000 DG_{65}	—	February 29, 2000	Socorro	LINEAR	·	3.0 km	MPC · JPL
103931	2000 DN_{65}	—	February 29, 2000	Socorro	LINEAR	·	3.9 km	MPC · JPL
103932	2000 DS_{65}	—	February 29, 2000	Socorro	LINEAR	·	4.8 km	MPC · JPL
103933	2000 DY_{66}	—	February 29, 2000	Socorro	LINEAR	·	3.7 km	MPC · JPL
103934	2000 DK_{67}	—	February 29, 2000	Socorro	LINEAR	NYS	2.1 km	MPC · JPL
103935	2000 DS_{67}	—	February 29, 2000	Socorro	LINEAR	MRX	2.2 km	MPC · JPL
103936	2000 DV_{67}	—	February 29, 2000	Socorro	LINEAR	AGN	2.6 km	MPC · JPL
103937	2000 DR_{68}	—	February 29, 2000	Socorro	LINEAR	·	4.5 km	MPC · JPL
103938	2000 DU_{68}	—	February 29, 2000	Socorro	LINEAR	(2076)	2.5 km	MPC · JPL
103939	2000 DJ_{69}	—	February 29, 2000	Socorro	LINEAR	·	3.4 km	MPC · JPL
103940	2000 DM_{69}	—	February 29, 2000	Socorro	LINEAR	·	4.7 km	MPC · JPL
103941	2000 DW_{69}	—	February 29, 2000	Socorro	LINEAR	·	2.1 km	MPC · JPL
103942	2000 DE_{70}	—	February 29, 2000	Socorro	LINEAR	·	5.3 km	MPC · JPL
103943	2000 DU_{70}	—	February 29, 2000	Socorro	LINEAR	EOS	4.6 km	MPC · JPL
103944	2000 DE_{71}	—	February 29, 2000	Socorro	LINEAR	·	2.3 km	MPC · JPL
103945	2000 DK_{71}	—	February 29, 2000	Socorro	LINEAR	·	3.2 km	MPC · JPL
103946	2000 DG_{72}	—	February 29, 2000	Socorro	LINEAR	·	5.6 km	MPC · JPL
103947	2000 DK_{72}	—	February 29, 2000	Socorro	LINEAR	·	5.3 km	MPC · JPL
103948	2000 DP_{72}	—	February 29, 2000	Socorro	LINEAR	·	1.6 km	MPC · JPL
103949	2000 DD_{73}	—	February 29, 2000	Socorro	LINEAR	NYS	1.9 km	MPC · JPL
103950	2000 DK_{73}	—	February 29, 2000	Socorro	LINEAR	KOR	3.6 km	MPC · JPL
103951	2000 DW_{73}	—	February 29, 2000	Socorro	LINEAR	·	2.3 km	MPC · JPL
103952	2000 DA_{74}	—	February 29, 2000	Socorro	LINEAR	EOS	6.7 km	MPC · JPL
103953	2000 DB_{74}	—	February 29, 2000	Socorro	LINEAR	·	1.4 km	MPC · JPL
103954	2000 DM_{74}	—	February 29, 2000	Socorro	LINEAR	·	3.5 km	MPC · JPL
103955	2000 DB_{75}	—	February 29, 2000	Socorro	LINEAR	·	4.4 km	MPC · JPL
103956	2000 DR_{75}	—	February 29, 2000	Socorro	LINEAR	·	3.3 km	MPC · JPL
103957	2000 DS_{75}	—	February 29, 2000	Socorro	LINEAR	·	3.6 km	MPC · JPL
103958	2000 DC_{76}	—	February 29, 2000	Socorro	LINEAR	·	6.6 km	MPC · JPL
103959	2000 DT_{76}	—	February 29, 2000	Socorro	LINEAR	·	3.1 km	MPC · JPL
103960	2000 DD_{77}	—	February 29, 2000	Socorro	LINEAR	·	4.1 km	MPC · JPL
103961	2000 DM_{77}	—	February 29, 2000	Socorro	LINEAR	PAD	4.3 km	MPC · JPL
103962	2000 DZ_{77}	—	February 29, 2000	Socorro	LINEAR	·	4.4 km	MPC · JPL
103963	2000 DT_{78}	—	February 29, 2000	Socorro	LINEAR	THM	5.5 km	MPC · JPL
103964	2000 DV_{78}	—	February 29, 2000	Socorro	LINEAR	EMA	8.4 km	MPC · JPL
103965	2000 DW_{78}	—	February 29, 2000	Socorro	LINEAR	·	3.9 km	MPC · JPL
103966 Luni	2000 DC_{79}	Luni	February 28, 2000	Monte Agliale	S. Donati	·	2.5 km	MPC · JPL
103967	2000 DP_{79}	—	February 28, 2000	Socorro	LINEAR	V	1.3 km	MPC · JPL
103968	2000 DX_{79}	—	February 28, 2000	Socorro	LINEAR	·	1.4 km	MPC · JPL
103969	2000 DB_{80}	—	February 28, 2000	Socorro	LINEAR	NYS	2.5 km	MPC · JPL
103970	2000 DK_{80}	—	February 28, 2000	Socorro	LINEAR	·	4.6 km	MPC · JPL
103971	2000 DW_{80}	—	February 28, 2000	Socorro	LINEAR	NYS	1.8 km	MPC · JPL
103972	2000 DD_{81}	—	February 28, 2000	Socorro	LINEAR	·	1.9 km	MPC · JPL
103973	2000 DL_{82}	—	February 28, 2000	Socorro	LINEAR	·	1.8 km	MPC · JPL
103974	2000 DF_{83}	—	February 28, 2000	Socorro	LINEAR	·	5.7 km	MPC · JPL
103975	2000 DO_{83}	—	February 28, 2000	Socorro	LINEAR	·	6.0 km	MPC · JPL
103976	2000 DR_{83}	—	February 28, 2000	Socorro	LINEAR	(5)	2.8 km	MPC · JPL
103977	2000 DS_{84}	—	February 29, 2000	Socorro	LINEAR	·	5.0 km	MPC · JPL
103978	2000 DZ_{84}	—	February 29, 2000	Socorro	LINEAR	EUN	2.6 km	MPC · JPL
103979	2000 DN_{85}	—	February 29, 2000	Socorro	LINEAR	·	3.6 km	MPC · JPL
103980	2000 DT_{85}	—	February 29, 2000	Socorro	LINEAR	·	2.9 km	MPC · JPL
103981	2000 DC_{86}	—	February 29, 2000	Socorro	LINEAR	·	3.6 km	MPC · JPL
103982	2000 DE_{86}	—	February 29, 2000	Socorro	LINEAR	·	8.0 km	MPC · JPL
103983	2000 DG_{86}	—	February 29, 2000	Socorro	LINEAR	·	2.4 km	MPC · JPL
103984	2000 DH_{86}	—	February 29, 2000	Socorro	LINEAR	·	5.2 km	MPC · JPL
103985	2000 DE_{89}	—	February 26, 2000	Kitt Peak	Spacewatch	·	1.6 km	MPC · JPL
103986	2000 DB_{90}	—	February 27, 2000	Kitt Peak	Spacewatch	·	1.5 km	MPC · JPL
103987	2000 DS_{92}	—	February 28, 2000	Kitt Peak	Spacewatch	·	1.4 km	MPC · JPL
103988	2000 DE_{93}	—	February 28, 2000	Socorro	LINEAR	·	2.2 km	MPC · JPL
103989	2000 DC_{94}	—	February 28, 2000	Socorro	LINEAR	L4	22 km	MPC · JPL
103990	2000 DS_{94}	—	February 28, 2000	Socorro	LINEAR	·	9.0 km	MPC · JPL
103991	2000 DC_{95}	—	February 28, 2000	Socorro	LINEAR	·	5.2 km	MPC · JPL
103992	2000 DG_{95}	—	February 28, 2000	Socorro	LINEAR	·	2.0 km	MPC · JPL
103993	2000 DH_{95}	—	February 28, 2000	Socorro	LINEAR	·	2.1 km	MPC · JPL
103994	2000 DQ_{95}	—	February 28, 2000	Socorro	LINEAR	V	1.5 km	MPC · JPL
103995	2000 DX_{95}	—	February 28, 2000	Socorro	LINEAR	·	3.1 km	MPC · JPL
103996	2000 DX_{96}	—	February 29, 2000	Socorro	LINEAR	(2076)	2.4 km	MPC · JPL
103997	2000 DV_{97}	—	February 29, 2000	Socorro	LINEAR	·	2.4 km	MPC · JPL
103998	2000 DE_{98}	—	February 29, 2000	Socorro	LINEAR	·	4.7 km	MPC · JPL
103999	2000 DB_{99}	—	February 29, 2000	Socorro	LINEAR	V	1.5 km	MPC · JPL
104000	2000 DM_{99}	—	February 29, 2000	Socorro	LINEAR	·	1.6 km	MPC · JPL

back to top

== See also ==
- Meanings of minor-planet names: 103001–104000
