= Meanings of minor-planet names: 103001–104000 =

As minor planet discoveries are confirmed, they are given a permanent number by the IAU's Minor Planet Center (MPC), and the discoverers can then submit names for them, following the IAU's naming conventions. The list below concerns those minor planets in the specified number-range that have received names, and explains the meanings of those names.

Official naming citations of newly named small Solar System bodies are approved and published in a bulletin by IAU's Working Group for Small Bodies Nomenclature (WGSBN). Before May 2021, citations were published in MPC's Minor Planet Circulars for many decades. Recent citations can also be found on the JPL Small-Body Database (SBDB). Until his death in 2016, German astronomer Lutz D. Schmadel compiled these citations into the Dictionary of Minor Planet Names (DMP) and regularly updated the collection.

Based on Paul Herget's The Names of the Minor Planets, Schmadel also researched the unclear origin of numerous asteroids, most of which had been named prior to World War II. This article incorporates text from this source, which is in the public domain: SBDB New namings may only be added to this list below after official publication as the preannouncement of names is condemned. The WGSBN publishes a comprehensive guideline for the naming rules of non-cometary small Solar System bodies.

== 103001–103100 ==
Named minor planet	Provisional	This minor planet was named for...	Ref · Catalog
103015 Gianfrancomarcon	1999 XF_{104}	Gianfranco Marcon (1939–2022) was an Italian telescope builder.	IAU · 103015
103016 Davidčástek	1999 XH_{105}	David Částek (b. 1980), a collaborator of the Department of Interplanetary Matter of the Ondřejov Observatory	IAU · 103016

== 103101–103200 ==
back to top

Named minor planet	Provisional	This minor planet was named for...	Ref · Catalog
There are no named minor planets in this number range

== 103201–103300 ==
back to top

Named minor planet	Provisional	This minor planet was named for...	Ref · Catalog
103220 Kwongchuikuen	1999 YQ_{4}	Kwong Chui Kuen (born 1960), American producer of television documentaries, and the wife of the discoverer (this was his first minor planet)	JPL · 103220

== 103301–103400 ==
back to top

Named minor planet	Provisional	This minor planet was named for...	Ref · Catalog
There are no named minor planets in this number range

== 103401–103500 ==
back to top

Named minor planet	Provisional	This minor planet was named for...	Ref · Catalog
103421 Laurmatt	2000 AD_{151}	Laurenne Greco (born 1991) and Mattia Vivarelli (born 1986), Italian amateur astronomers engaged in meteor research at San Marcello Pistoiese Observatory	JPL · 103421
103422 Laurisirén	2000 AG_{153}	Lauri Sirén (1921–), Finnish amateur astronomer and founder of the amateur astronomical association Jyväskylän Sirius	JPL · 103422
103460 Dieterherrmann	2000 AC_{204}	Dieter B. Herrmann (born 1939), German astronomer and physicist and director of the director of the Archenhold Observatory in Berlin	JPL · 103460

== 103501–103600 ==
back to top

Named minor planet	Provisional	This minor planet was named for...	Ref · Catalog
103560 Peate	2000 BZ_{31}	John Peate (1820–1902) was an amateur optician who fabricated large telescope mirrors in the late 19th century, culminating with a 62" mirror in 1897, then the largest in the world. That mirror is now kept in the collections of the Smithsonian Institution, National Museum of American History in Washington DC.	JPL · 103560

== 103601–103700 ==
back to top

Named minor planet	Provisional	This minor planet was named for...	Ref · Catalog
There are no named minor planets in this number range

== 103701–103800 ==
back to top

Named minor planet	Provisional	This minor planet was named for...	Ref · Catalog
103733 Bernardharris	2000 CD_{105}	Bernard Anthony Harris Jr. (born 1956) is a former NASA astronaut who flew on two space shuttle missions. In 1993, he was a mission specialist who carried out research as part of Spacelab D-2. As Payload Commander on the space shuttle in 1995, he became the first African American to conduct a spacewalk.	JPL · 103733
103734 Winstonscott	2000 CO_{106}	Winston Elliott Scott (born 1950) is a former NASA astronaut who has flown two missions into space. Scott completed three spacewalks to retrieve satellites and evaluate the assembly of the International Space Station. He also performed experiments about the effects of zero gravity on the human body.	JPL · 103734
103737 Curbeam	2000 CU_{108}	Robert Lee Curbeam Jr (born 1962) is a retired NASA astronaut and the first person to perform four spacewalks on a single mission. While in space Curbeam helped to fix a solar panel and install a new truss in the International Space Station. He has totaled more than 37 days in space and 45 hours on spacewalks.	JPL · 103737
103738 Stephaniewilson	2000 CA_{110}	Stephanie Diana Wilson (born 1966) is a NASA astronaut and the second African American women to fly in space. She has flown on three missions and as of 2020, she has logged the most time in space of any African American astronaut (42 days). She also served as the ground commander for the first all-women spacewalk in 2019.	JPL · 103738
103739 Higginbotham	2000 CT_{110}	Joan Higginbotham (born 1964) is an electrical engineer and former NASA Astronaut. She actively participated in 53 space shuttle launches as an engineer at Kennedy Space Center before becoming the third African American woman to go into space.	JPL · 103739
103740 Budinger	2000 CV_{110}	Donald V. Budinger (born 1942), American chairman and founding director of the Rodel Foundations and Science Foundation Arizona	JPL · 103740
103770 Wilfriedlang	2000 DP_{1}	Wilfried Lang (born 1951), a German engineer	JPL · 103770

== 103801–103900 ==
back to top

Named minor planet	Provisional	This minor planet was named for...	Ref · Catalog
There are no named minor planets in this number range

== 103901–104000 ==
back to top

Named minor planet	Provisional	This minor planet was named for...	Ref · Catalog
103966 Luni	2000 DC_{79}	The Italian municipality of Luni, an ancient and powerful Roman city founded in 177 BC on the shores of the Ligurian Sea	JPL · 103966

back to top

Preceded by 102,001–103,000	Meanings of minor-planet names List of minor planets: 103,001–104,000	Succeeded by 104,001–105,000
