= Nyrölä Observatory =

Astronomical observatory in Finland

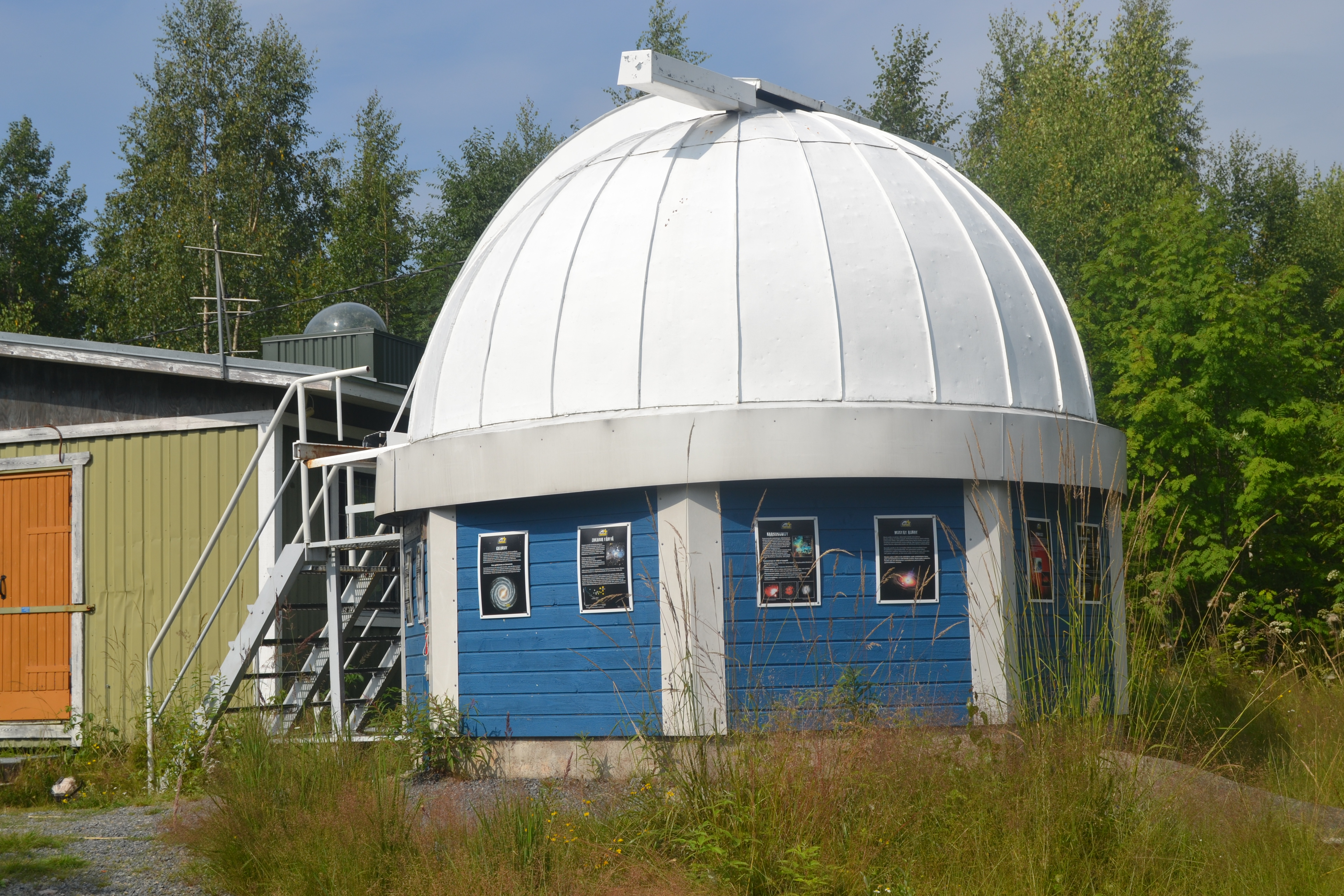
- Organization: Jyväskylän Sirius ry
- Observatory code: 174
- Location: Nyrölä, Jyväskylä, Finland
- Coordinates: 62°20′32″N 25°30′47″E
- Altitude: 200 metres (660 ft)
- Website: www.ursa.fi/sirius/nytt/nytt_info.html

Telescopes
- unnamed: 40 cm Meade LX200
- unnamed: 20 cm Meade LX200

Nyrölä Observatory (Finnish: Nyrölän observatorio) is an amateur astronomical observatory in Finland. It is owned and operated by the astronomical association Jyväskylän Sirius ry, and located in the countryside village of Nyrölä near Jyväskylä.

Discoveries: asteroid 22978 Nyrola that was the first asteroid discovered by Finnish amateur astronomers, Harri Hyvönen, Marko Moilanen and Arto Oksanen. The Minor Planet Center currently credits this discovery to the observatory (MPC).

== See also ==
- List of astronomical observatories
- Hankasalmi Observatory
