= Arto Oksanen =

Finnish amateur astronomer and observer

Minor planets discovered: 1
103422 Laurisirén^{1}	9 January 2000	MPC
^{1} co-discovered with M. Moilanen

Arto Oksanen is a Finnish amateur astronomer and observer at the Nyrölä Observatory, located about 20 kilometers from the city of Jyväskylä in Finland.

He has been actively working in the fields of variable stars, asteroid search programs, gamma ray bursts, CCD photometry and building amateur observatories in Finland. Together with Marko Moilanen he co-discovered the main-belt asteroid 103422 Laurisirén in 2000.

In 2004, Oksanen received the AAVSO Directors Award for his work in variable star research and observing.

In October 2007, Oksanen was the first to find optical afterglow of GRB 071010B which had been detected by Swift satellite only 17 minutes before.

== See also ==
- List of minor planet discoverers § A. Oksanen
