= Hankasalmi Observatory =

Astronomical observatory in Finland

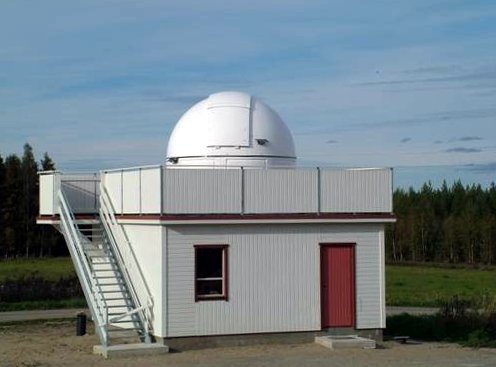
- Organization: Jyväskylän Sirius ry
- Observatory code: A91
- Location: Hankasalmi, Finland
- Coordinates: 62°15′17″N 26°35′47″E
- Established: 2005
- Website: http://murtoinen.jklsirius.fi/

Telescopes
- RC16: 40 cm Ritchey-Chrétien telescope
- RT300: 300 cm radio telescope

Hankasalmi Observatory (Finnish: Hankasalmen observatorio) is a remote-controlled astronomical observatory in Hankasalmi, Finland. It is owned and operated by astronomy club Jyväskylän Sirius ry. The observatory has a robotic 40 cm Ritchey-Chrétien telescope, an all-sky camera and a 3-meter radio telescope. The optical telescope is used mainly for pro-am research of variable stars and comets.

== See also ==
- List of astronomical observatories
