= Bonmatí =

Bonmatí may refer to:

- Aitana Bonmatí
- Sant Julià del Llor i Bonmatí
- Luis Marti-Bonmati
