= Daniel Tordera =

Spanish scientist and writer

- Born: 17/01/1986; Valencia, Spain
- Education: University of Valencia École européenne de chimie, polymères et matériaux University of Strasbourg
- Scientific career
- Fields: Organic Electronics, Perovskites, Optoelectronic Devices, Plasmonics
- Workplaces: Linköping University TNO University of Valencia

Daniel Antonio Tordera Salvador (born 17 January 1986) is a Spanish chemist, materials scientist and writer. He is an associate professor in the Department of Physical Chemistry at the University of Valencia and serves as vice-dean of its Faculty of Chemistry.

== Early life and education ==
Tordera was born in Valencia, Spain. He studied chemistry at the University of Valencia, where he graduated top of his class in 2009. He later completed a materials science engineering degree at the École européene de chimie, polymères et matériaux in Strasbourg, France. He earned a PhD from the University of Valencia in 2014; his doctoral research focused on light-emitting electrochemical cells.

== Research ==
Tordera joined University of Valencia in 2009 where his early research focused on light-emitting electrochemical cells (LECs). He determined the elusive operational mechanism of LECs and dramatically increased the performance of these devices. He was a visiting scientist at University of California, Santa Barbara, where he conducted research on conjugated polyelectrolytes. He subsequently co-founded a company aimed at commercializing related research outputs. He joined Linköping University to research the optical and thermal properties of plasmonic nanoholes. He worked on the development of a plasmonic thermoelectric device, a photoconductive paper and a plasmonic display, among others. He later joined Holst Centre (TNO) where he led a team working on near-infrared organic photodetectors. His research at Holst Centre included the development of the first large-area thin-film vein detector and studies applying organic photodetectors to biometrics and healthcare. Since November 2020, he has led a research line at the University of Valencia focused on perovskite-based photodetectors and light-emitting devices, including work on perovskite transport layers for OLEDs, semitransparent near-infrared perovskite photodetectors, narrowband monolithic perovskite tandem devices, and vacuum-deposited perovskite X-ray photodiodes.

Tordera is the author of more than 70 peer-reviewed scientific publications and an inventor on five patents.

== Awards ==
2023 - XVIII Ciutat d'Algemesí Scientific-Technical Award.

2020 - Society of Information Display Distinguished Paper.

2015 - Nanomatmol Award: Best PH.D. in Nanotechnology and Molecular Materials in Spain by the Spanish Royal Society of Chemistry.

2015 - Outstanding Doctorate Award by the Universidad de Valencia.

2012 - European Materials Research Society Spring Meeting Young Scientist Award.

2010 - Award "Suschem Young Chemistry Researchers" to the Highest Academic Achievement in Spain by the Spanish Royal Society of Chemistry.

== Writing ==
In 2018, Tordera's novel El arte de la fuga was selected among the ten finalist manuscripts for the 67th Premio Planeta. The novel was later published by Valhalla Ediciones in 2022. In 2021, he published the illustrated children's book El dueño del mundo (illustrated by Alba Alcaraz) with Babidi-Bú. He has also contributed fiction to the anthology Lab3 – Fugitivos (Ediciones Contrabando).
