= IFIC =

IFIC may mean:

- IFIC Bank, a private commercial bank in Bangladesh
- Interim Forum for an Independence Convention, another term for Independence Convention, supporters of Scottish independence
- NDLC-IFIC Bank, Pakistan
- International Food Information Council
- International Federation of Infection Control
- International Feed-In Cooperation
- Instituto de Física Corpuscular, a particle physics research center in Valencia, Spain.
- Investment Fund Institute of Canada
- A slogan for Beech-Nut chewing gum; an abbreviation of "it's flavor-ific"
- An abbreviation of the Weeknd's 2016 song, "I Feel It Coming"
