= Astronomical Observatory of the University of Valencia =

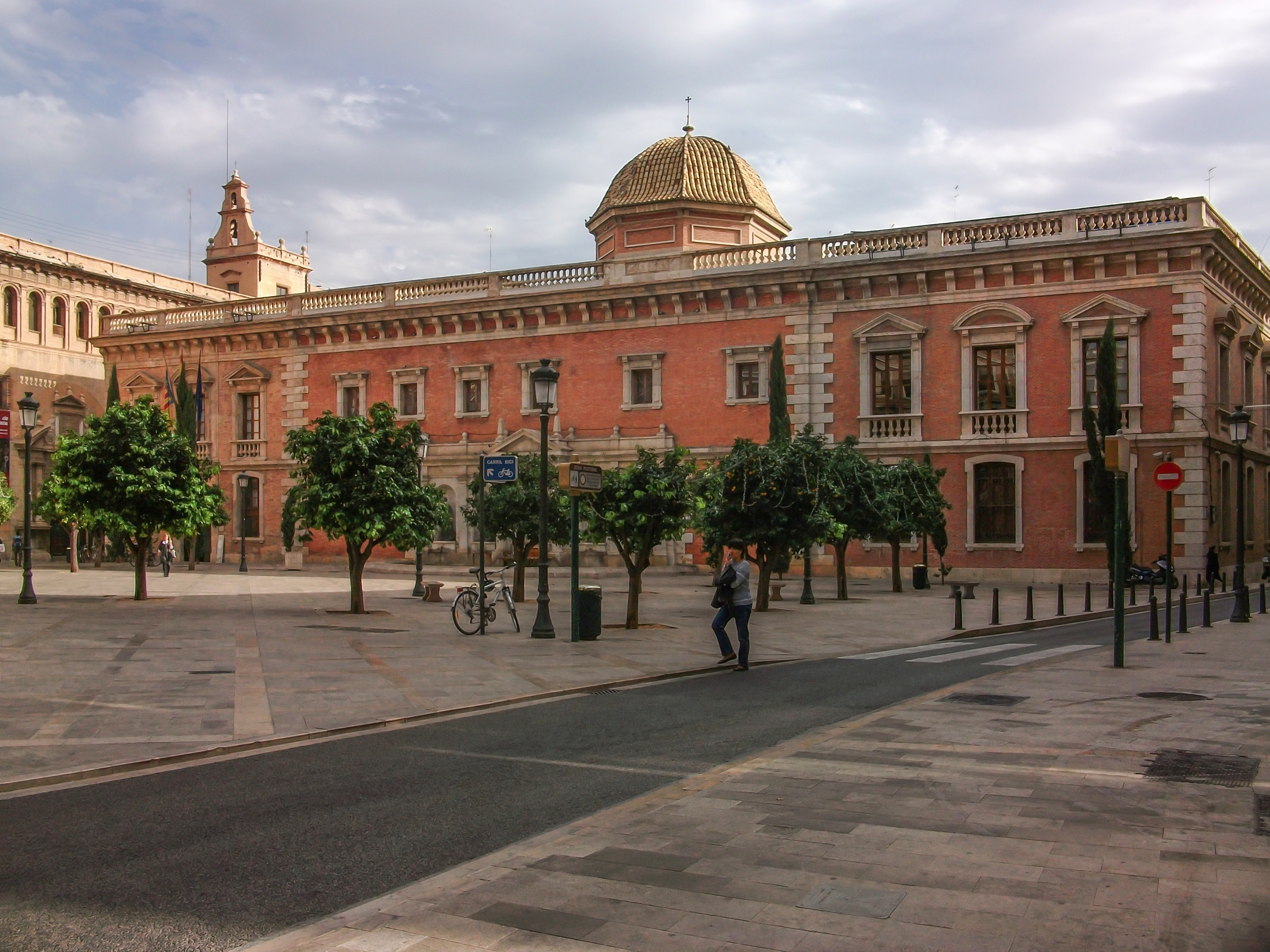
The University of Valencia historic building, on which roof the first headquarters of the Astronomical Observatory of this university were established.

The Astronomical Observatory of the University of Valencia (Valencian: Observatori Astronòmic de la Universitat de València, Spanish: Observatorio Astronómico de la Universidad de Valencia; also known by its abbreviation OAUV), is a research institution of the University of Valencia. Founded in 1909 by the Spanish astronomer Ignacio Tarazona, it is the oldest university observatory in Spain. It was declared of public utility by King Alfonso XIII in 1920.

== History ==
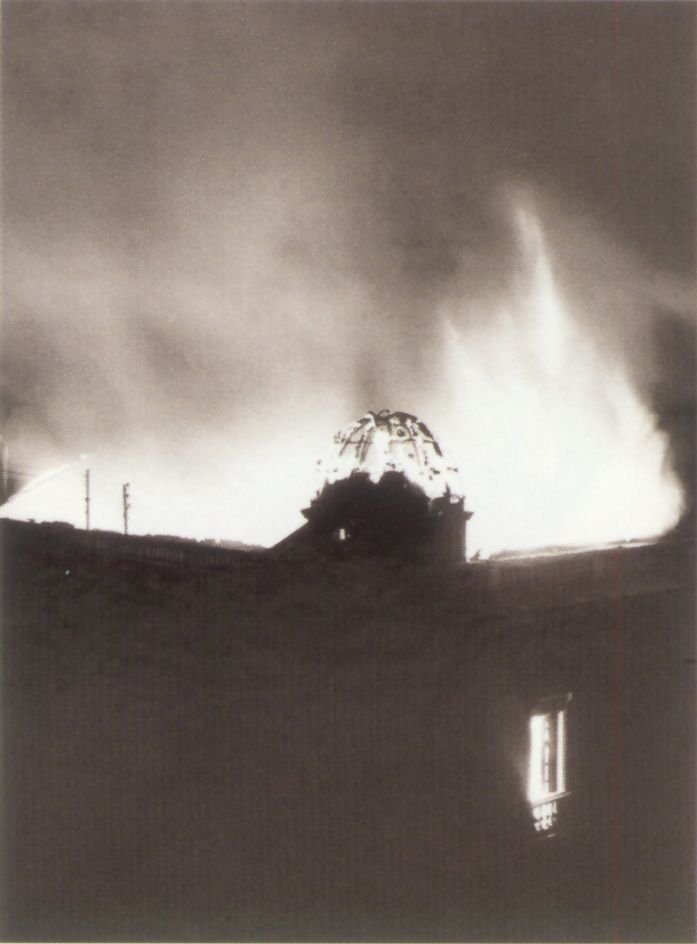
Dome of the Astronomical Observatory in flames during the fire that razed it in 1932.

An earlier astronomical observatory was established in 1790 by the Rector of the University of Valencia Vicente Blasco y García. It was located in the Santo Tomás de Villanueva college, very close to the University historic building. At the time it was the first university astronomical observatory in Spain, as there were only three other Spanish observatories (Royal Observatory of Madrid, Real Instituto y Observatorio de la Armada in San Fernando (Cádiz), and Fabra Observatory in Barcelona), none of which linked to a University. Unfortunately, when the Napoleonic wars devastated the city in 1812, numerous infrastructures belonging to the University of Valencia, including the Observatory, were destroyed.

The current astronomical observatory of the University of Valencia was founded almost a century later, in 1909, by the astronomer Ignacio Tarazona. A new dome and new instruments were installed in the University of Valencia's historic building, located on Calle La Nau. In addition to its teaching activity, the observatory began a daily program to obtain photographic plates of the Sun and meteorological observations. Since 1913 the observatory of the University of Valencia served the official time of the city of Valencia. Thanks to its work for the dissemination of science, the Spanish state declared it an institution of public utility in 1920.

In 1932 the building suffered a fire and the Observatory facilities were destroyed. The dome and the instruments were relocated a few years later to the west tower of the new Science college building on Blasco Ibáñez Avenue, that nowadays hosts most of the Rectoral and administrative offices of the University.

The Observatory headquarters are located in the University of Valencia Science Park in Paterna, within the metropolitan area of Valencia and very close to the University of Valencia Burjassot Campus, where the scientific and engineering colleges are hosted. After more than a century of operations, its observational facilities are currently located in the town of Aras de los Olmos.

== Facilities ==
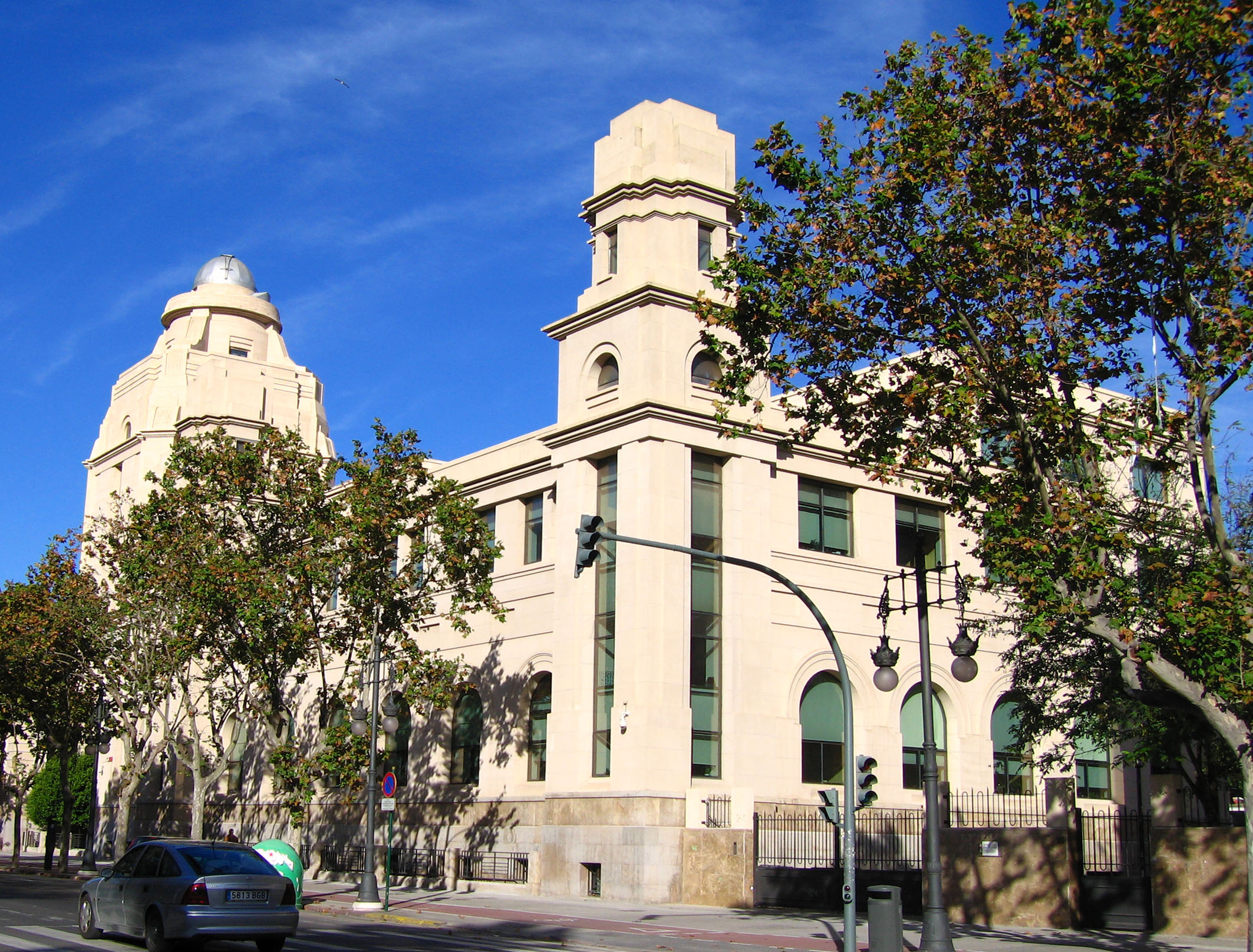
The University of Valencia's Rectorate, crowned by the astronomical dome.

Currently the facilities of the observatory are spread over different locations:

=== Valencia ===
The west tower of the current University of Valencia's Rectorate building (39°28′46″N 0°21′53″W) was formerly the headquarters of the astronomical observatory. Currently there is still a 1909 Grubb telescope and a dome, and the top floors of the tower house part of the observatory's museum collection. The site is used for public visits and as a venue for special occasions. It still keeps, for historical reasons, the IAU observatory code 975.

=== Paterna ===
The current headquarters (39°30′52″N 0°25′31″W) are in the University of Valencia Science Park at Paterna. These facilities house the staff offices, part of the observatory's museum collection, the "Aula del Cel", an educative classroom for primary and high school student group activities, and the administration.

=== Aras de los Olmos ===
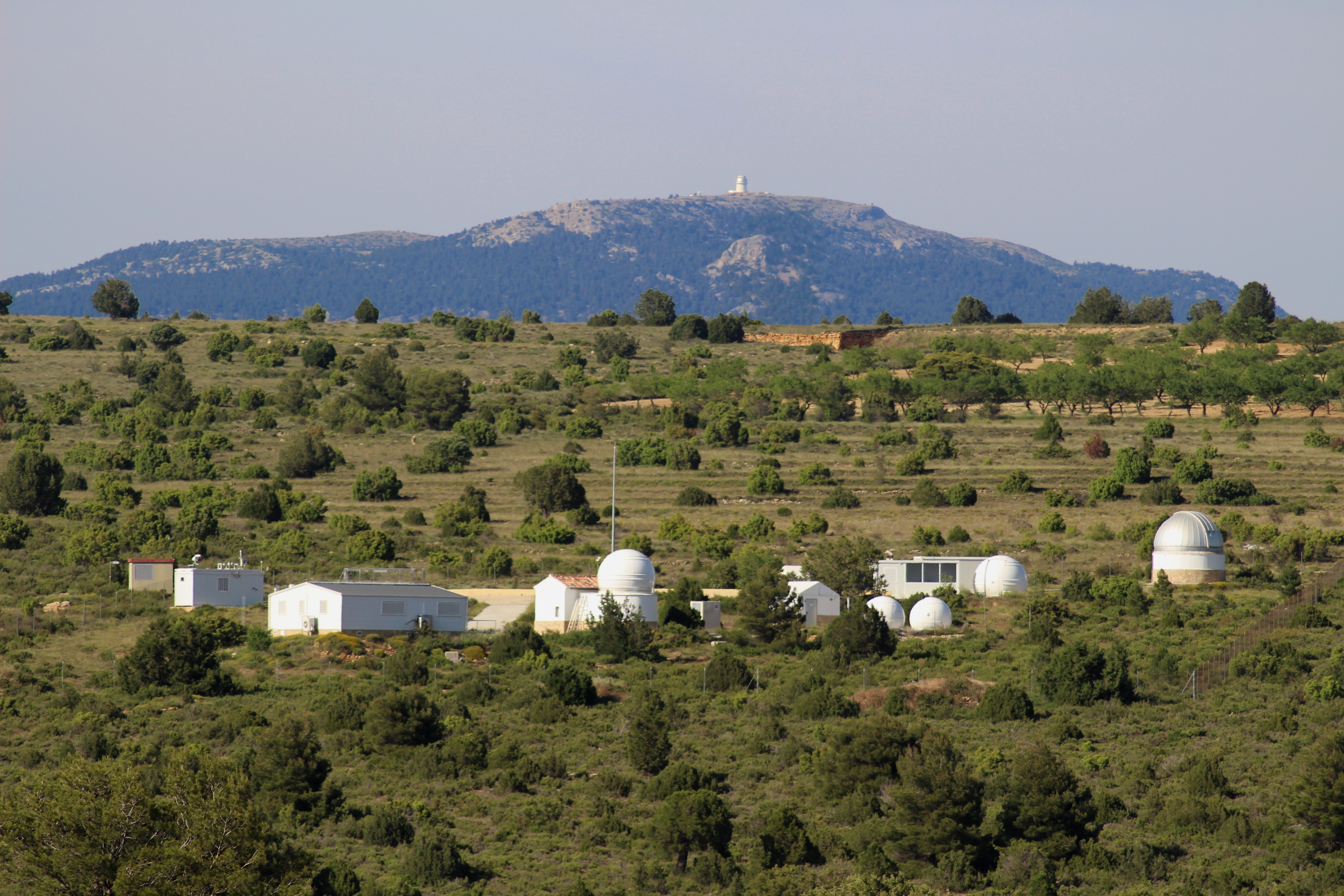
Observatorio de Aras de los Olmos – University of Valencia

The "Observatori d'Aras de los Olmos" (OAO) (39°56′42″N 1°06′06″W) is the current observation station, located at Aras de los Olmos, a hundred km inland from Paterna, on top of the mountain Muela de Santa Catalina, at an altitude of 1280 m. It has the IAU observatory code Z35.

These premises host five telescopes with diameters 60, 52, 40, 30 and 14 cm, dedicated to spectroscopy, photometry, astrometry, transients and wide field deep imaging, respectively.

== Directors ==
- Ignacio Tarazona Blanch 1909–1924
- Juan Antonio Izquierdo Gómez 1924–1927 (Acting Director)
- Vicente Martí Ortells 1927–1951
- Under management of the dean of the Faculty of Sciences 1951–1968
- Álvaro López García 1968–1986 (Acting Director); 1986–2000 (Director)
- Vicent J. Martínez García 2000–2008
- Juan Fabregat Llueca 2008–2010 (Acting Director)
- Vicent J. Martínez García 2010–2013
- Eduardo Ros Ibarra 2013-2013
- José Carlos Guirado Puerta 2013–2020
- José Antonio Muñoz Lozano 2020-2026
- Manel Perucho Pla 2026-present

== See also ==
- List of astronomical observatories
