= Botanical Garden of Valencia =

Cultural property in Valencia, Spain

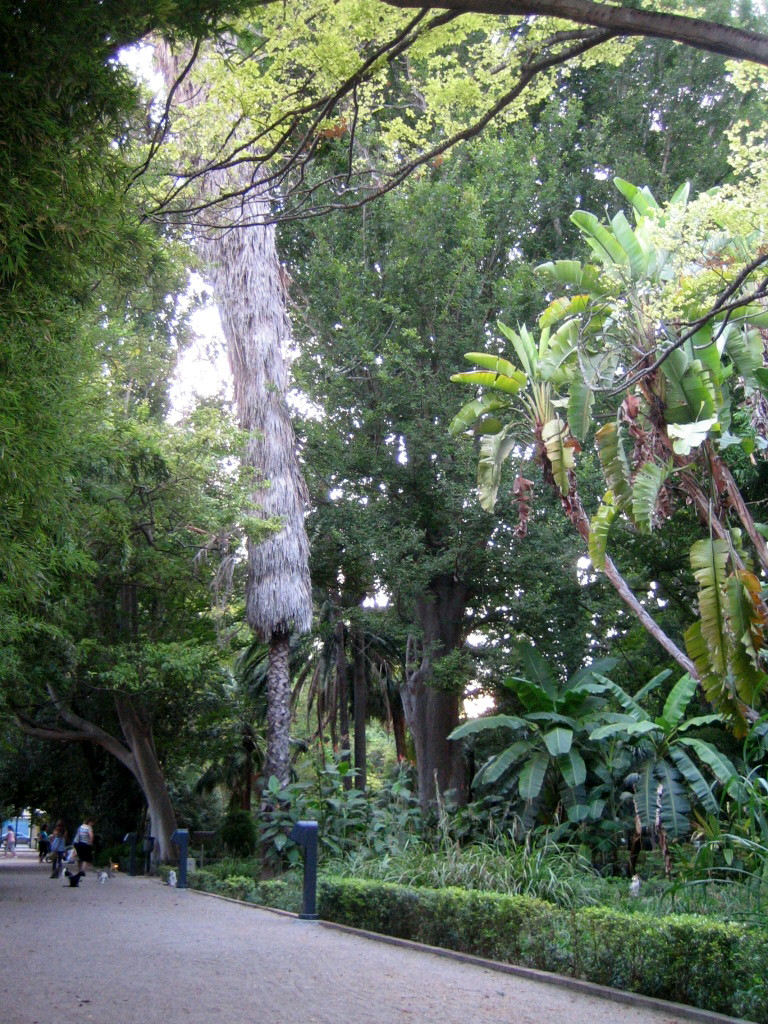
- Walkway in the Botanical Garden of Valencia

- Location within Valencian Community Location within Spain
- Type: Botanical Garden
- Coordinates: 39°28′37.32″N 0°23′12.08″W

The Botanical Garden of the University of Valencia (Valencian: Jardí Botànic de la Universitat de València) is a botanical garden located on calle Quart in El Botànic neighbourhood of Valencia, Spain. The garden depends administratively on the University of Valencia. It is a member of Botanical Gardens Conservation International (BGCI).

The University was growing herbs for medicinal purposes as early as the 16th century. A botanical garden was projected from the mid-18th century, and the Garden opened on its present site in 1802. It remains a centre for study, education and public use.

== History ==
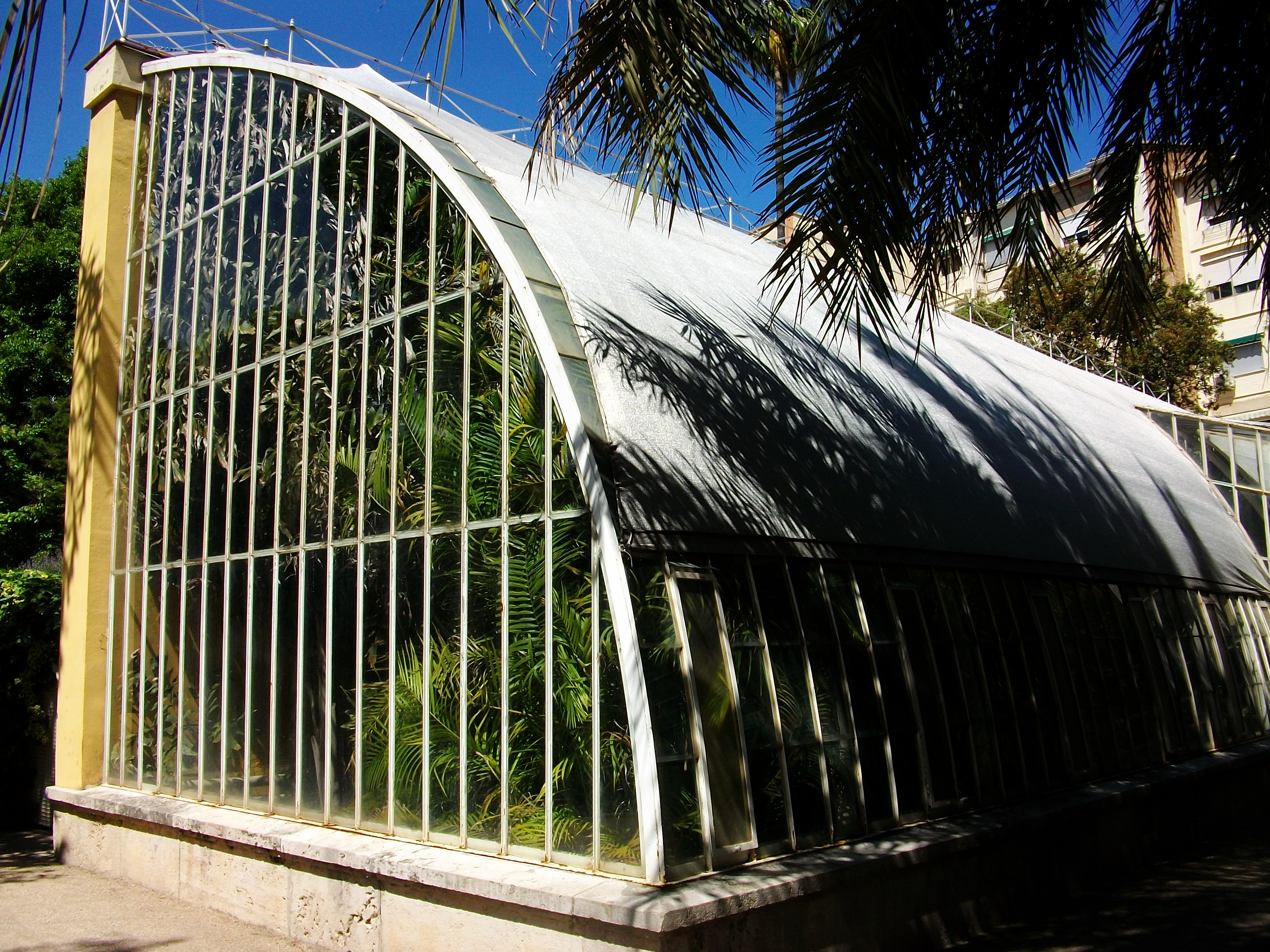
Greenhouse in la bassa (Pond)

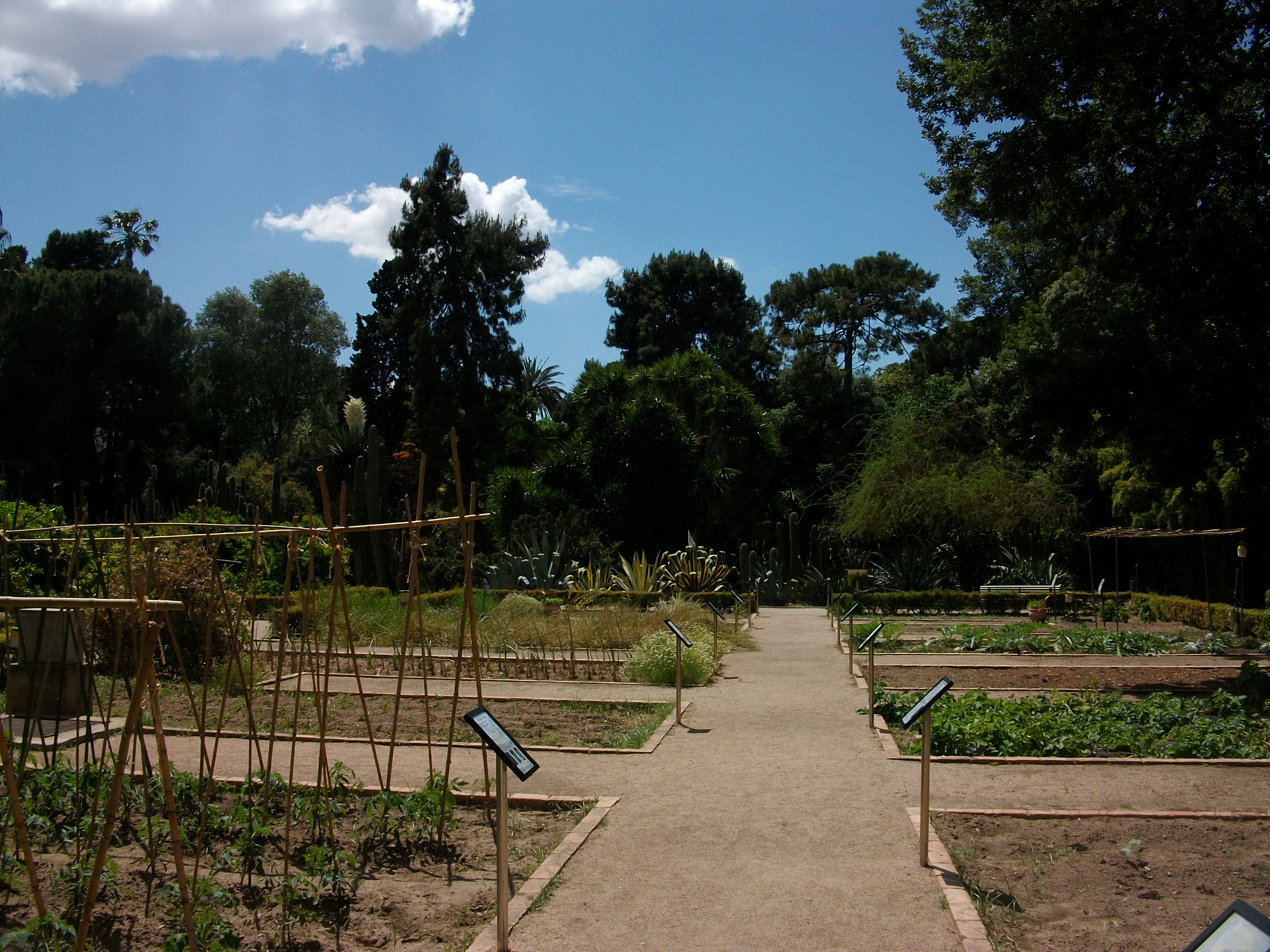
Pool

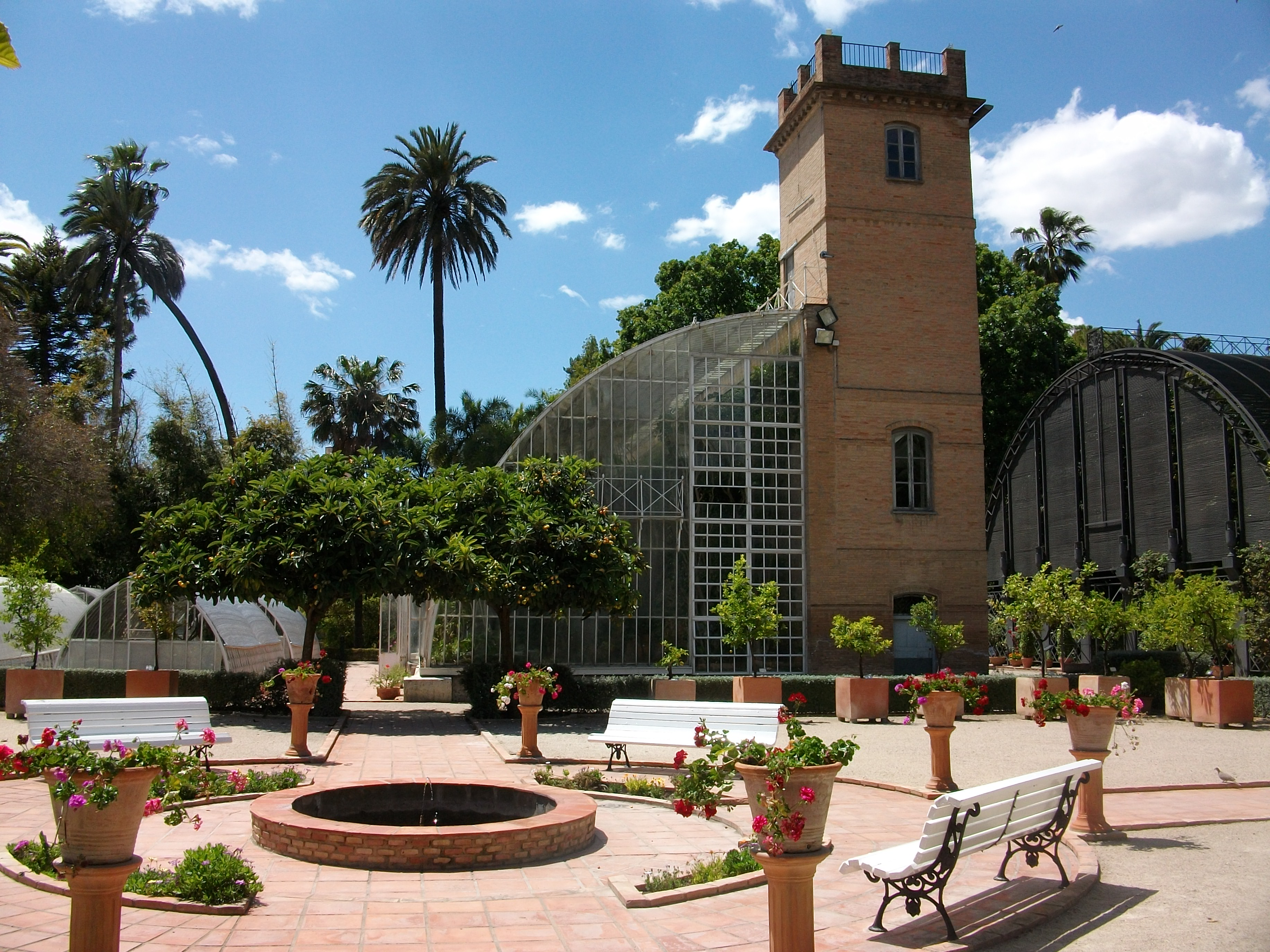
Carles Pau Square, Botanic Garden of Valencia

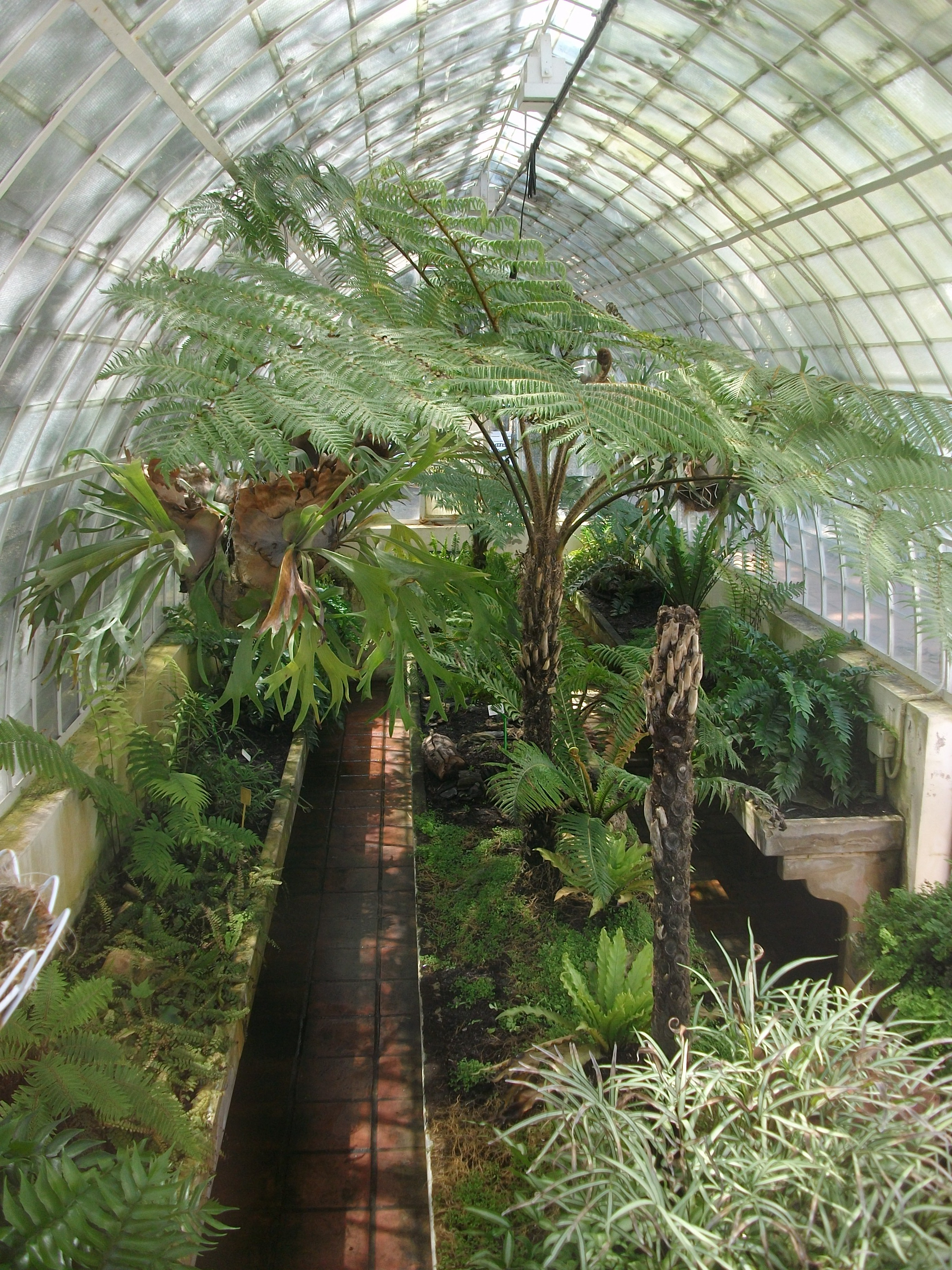
Greenhouse and ferns, Botanical Garden of Valencia

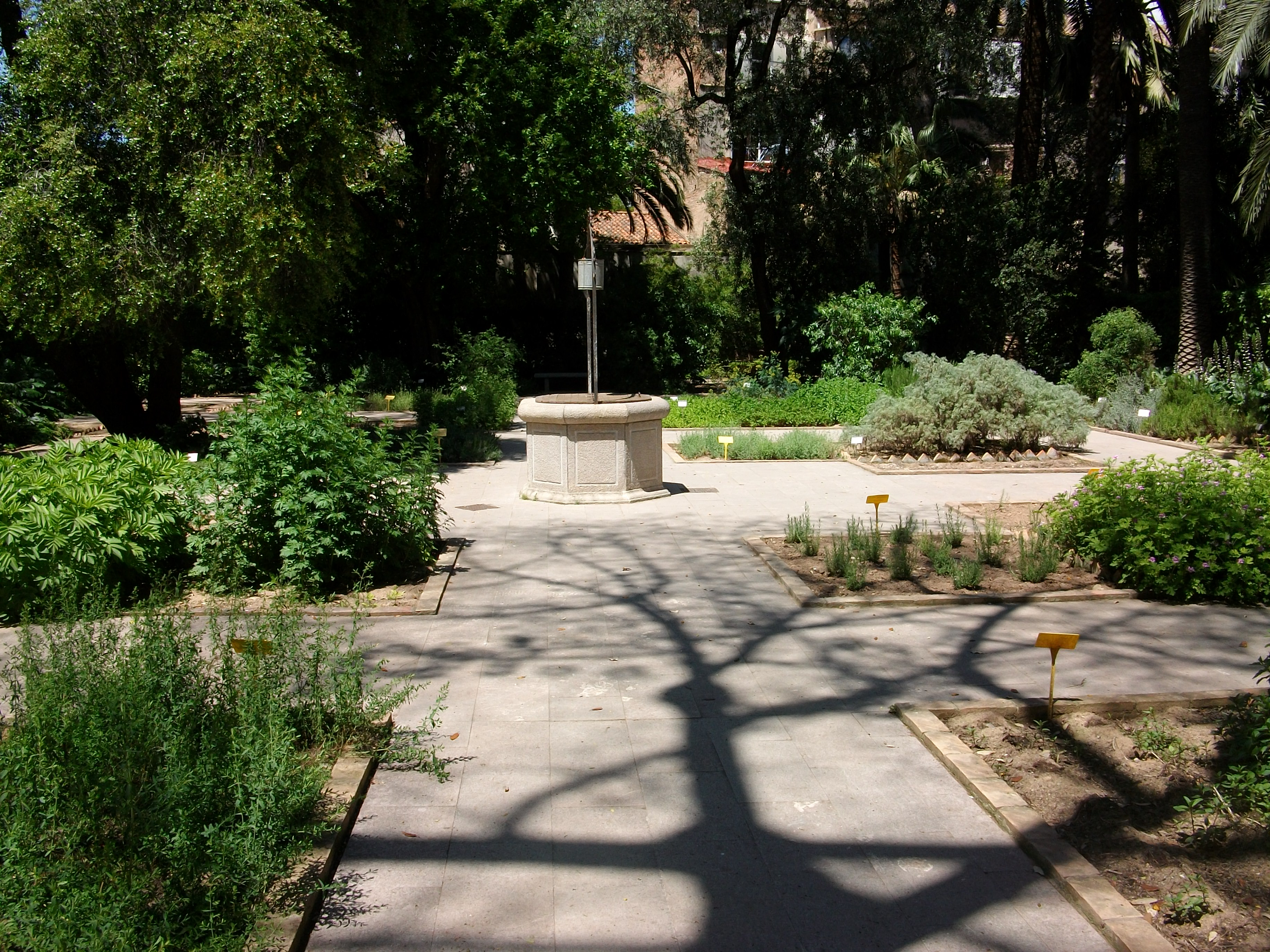
Medicinal plants section in the Botanical Garden of Valencia

=== Origins ===
There are documented records of plots for growing medicinal plants since the 16th century, closely related to medical education in the university, practised since 1462. The earliest reference dates from 1499, when a professorship in "simples" or "herbs" was being planned, and teachers were appointed to it in 1501. The plant collection had always been related to medicine, cultivating herbs for medicinal use. In 1548 a chair of medical practice was created, and a short time later (1560) teaching of "simples" or herbs was separated from that of anatomy, with independent departments. In 1567, the Jurats (municipal government) of the City of Valencia appointed Joan Plaça as doctor of medicine with the task of botanizing – collecting species – and gave him "a garden where those plants needed for teaching will be planted". Later, in 1631, there were several reports concerning these gardens, their location, and the doctors and professors in charge, but there does not appear to have been any assurance that the gardens would continue in being.

In 1733, the University considered the possibility of an enclosure to be provided by the city, but not until 1757 did rector Lores directly propose a comprehensive botanical garden, complete with orchard, museum, teaching and conference space, and ancillary services, in a location near the Albereda avenue. In 1778 the city endorsed this proposal, but it would be another twenty years before it was realised.

It is clear that this broader and more systematic concept of a botanical garden derived from the 18th-century development of the study of Botany as a science separate from Medicine. This development was inspired by Enlightenment thought, with a new interest in natural resources and agricultural improvements. In 1767 Gregori Maians called for the creation of a garden, to be run by the University's department of botany, to include the cultivation of plants of interest to medicine. In 1786, the University agreed to change the curriculum, separating the Professorship of Botany from the Professorship of Medicine, which made a Botanical Garden more of a necessity.

The Valencian Economic Society (Reial Societat Econòmica d'Amics del País de València), (Note: An institution established in the context of European enlightened reformism. It was a study and debate club focussed on national affairs and economic development on the basis of Enlightenment ideas.) interested in crop improvements, was also seeking at this time to work with the city government to provide land for such a scientific facility, together with a public promenade (Albereda). The society envisaged that the scheme would have scientific, instructional and recreational value.

=== Establishment ===
But this combination would not be so easy, because each party sought to emphasize its own priorities. The University's scientific and teaching interest looked for a systematic botanical collection representing the botanical sphere, while the Society aimed to maximise its utility for agriculture. The city finally yielded the promised ground to the University in 1798, but planting was soon suspended, apparently due to the poor quality of the soil and the inconveniences caused to the adjacent promenade of the Albereda. In 1802 the city offered a new and definitive site, which could be irrigated in the traditional way, by border irrigation, directly from the Rovella irrigation channel. It was called the Tramoieres and it was located in calle Quart, in front of the San Sebastian Minima convent and close to the Túria. This marked the origin of the present Botanical Garden.

The University placed the famous botanist Vicente Alfonso Lorente in charge of the new facility and provided him with the means to develop it. The trapezoidal site of about four hectares accommodated planting plots on a checkerboard system, known as the Linnaeus system, and also provided for herbaria, premises for the professor of Botany, buildings for the gardeners and other outbuildings. The successful completion of the garden quickly brought it renown among leading botanists, and relations were established particularly with the botanical garden in Madrid. This promising start would soon suffer the blow of the Napoleonic invasion, which was especially destructive in the Quart suburb. Lorente was also affected by these events: he was imprisoned and sentenced to death, and was saved only by the intervention of the French botanist Léon Dufour.

=== 19th-century development ===
After the war and the death of Lorente in 1813, the garden did not recover until the long term of leadership of Professor of Medicine Josep Pizcueta between 1829 and 1867. He undertook reforms and established it as the leading botanical garden in Spain. In response to a request by the Economic Society, experiments were carried out on acclimatization of plants native to America. At the same time, the chair of Agriculture was set up, directed by Joaquín Carrascosa. Also, in a process of convergence sanctioned by the Royal Order of 1834, teaching in agriculture and botany were brought together at the Botanical Garden, leading to an enlargement of the garden.

In 1843, Pizcueta, assisted by Félix Robillard, replaced the Linnaeus organization by the natural method of Endlicher. After a reform of the study programme in 1845, he received substantial resources for plantations and also for acclimatization installations, such as a large wooden greenhouse designed by the architect Timoteu Calvo, a conservatory and small heated spaces that, together, would accelerate dramatically the success and growth of the specimens. In 1856, the catalogue of the garden was published, with over 6,000 living species and the herbarium.

This phase of development bore lasting fruit in the construction of the iron and glass conservatory between 1860 and 1862. It was designed in 1859 by the well-known architect Sebastià Monleón. It is considered a building ahead of its time in regard of the materials used in its construction. The project was challenging in technological, financial and practical terms. It measures 24m long, 8.25m inner diameter and 9m high, and its glazed surface measures 465m^{2}. This south-facing glass cover has the shape of a quarter-circle, from the ground to a vertical wall, forming an attached space. Its size enables it to house such large plants as Astarapea, Aralia racemose (Araliaceae), Chorisia speciosa (Malvaceae) or Ficus benjamina (Moraceae), which may measure more than 5m high and cannot be accommodated in most other greenhouses. In making the case for funding this project, the University argued for the scientific necessity to provide the conditions needed to maintain the hundreds of exotic plants already brought to the garden, and also for maintaining its status among the leading gardens of Europe, keeping abreast of scientific progress.

A building topped with a turret was later attached to the greenhouse wall. Built to house management and research departments, this building still exists, although other features of interest such as wooden buildings, the original shade gardens and a greenhouse, have disappeared over the years. Nevertheless, the greenhouse has been reconstructed according to the 1867 plans of architect Idelfons Fernández Calvache, of which we have written records. These structures were probably replaced by the present iron ones during the last quarter of the 19th century.

Near the end of the 19th century, small greenhouses were built next to the seed nursery under the leadership of Arévalo Baca. In 1888, work was completed on the biggest greenhouse, which is known as “the raft” because of the proximity of the two elements. It was built according to the 1861 design.

In 1900, the present shade garden was opened. Planned in 1897 by the versatile Madrid architect Mélida Alinar in 1897, it was constructed of iron on a base of brick, and was inspired by the glass canopies of railway stations of the time. This marked the completion of building works on the site, and provided it with one of its most attractive features.

The botanical garden now became part of the science faculty, and the School of Botanical Studies increased its involvement with the site. The practical and experimental role of the plantations was enhanced in the context of the agricultural boom of that period, under the leadership of Rafael Cisternes (1867-1876) and Josep Arévalo Baca (1876-1888). In 1878 the northern extension was opened, creating the present-day layout of the enclosure, whose juxtaposition with the streets Beat Gaspar Bono and Quart has remained unchanged since then. Between 1879 and 1880 the campus of the Sant Josep college or dels Pares Jesuïtes was established.

=== 20th and 21st centuries ===
The garden was restored after the flood of 1957 thanks to the tenacity of the director Ignacio Docavo. Several damaged buildings were restored between 1962 and 1968, aiming to incorporate other elements of scientific interest.

Later, with professor Manuel Costa as director, a comprehensive rehabilitation was undertaken. This project included the garden – restructuring the plantations, alternative irrigation techniques, and care of the plots – and the most characteristic architectural elements – the outer fence, the greenhouses and heated spaces, the shade garden, and the pavilion. The research building was constructed in 2000 on the site of expropriated buildings facing calle Quart.

Currently, in addition to the preservation of the historic garden, it continues to function as a centre for botanical study, research, development and dissemination. It undertakes research on flora, biosystems and vegetation. It participates in international projects related to vegetational biodiversity and study of native plants. It has a library, a herbarium and a repository of germplasm. It promotes conferences of specialists, day classes, meetings and expositions.

Today, the Botanical Garden of the University provides a centre for scientific and teaching activities, a vegetated, architectural and historical space, and a feature of the urban landscape.

== Collections ==
Among the collections are the following:

- Adult palms, one of the largest in Europe.
- Several greenhouses
- Shade
- Aquatic plants
- Succulents
- Rockery
- Aquarium
- Aviary
