= Álvaro López-García =

Spanish astronomer

Minor planets discovered: 12
see § List of discovered minor planets

Álvaro López-García (1941-2019) was a Spanish astronomer, professor of astronomy at the University of Valencia and director of the Valencia University Observatory during the years 1968-2000. He was a specialist in astrometry and the dynamics of minor planets, and had discovered numerous of these bodies since the early 1980s, in collaboration with astronomer Henri Debehogne.

== Awards and honors ==
The main-belt asteroid 4657 Lopez, discovered by Nikolai Chernykh in 1979, was named in his honor.

== List of discovered minor planets ==
^{A} co-discoveries made with: H. Debehogne

(5755) 1992 OP7	20 July 1992	list^{[A]}
(7880) 1992 OM7	19 July 1992	list^{[A]}
(8376) 1992 OZ9	30 July 1992	list^{[A]}
(9195) 1992 OF9	26 July 1992	list^{[A]}
(10800) 1992 OM8	22 July 1992	list^{[A]}
(11297) 1992 PP6	5 August 1992	list^{[A]}

11538 Brunico	22 July 1992	list^{[A]}
(13556) 1992 OY7	21 July 1992	list^{[A]}
(13558) 1992 PR6	5 August 1992	list^{[A]}
(13981) 1992 OT9	28 July 1992	list^{[A]}
(17510) 1992 PD6	1 August 1992	list^{[A]}
(39559) 1992 OL8	22 July 1992	list^{[A]}

== See also ==
- List of minor planet discoverers § A. Lopez-G.
