= University of Valencia Science Park =

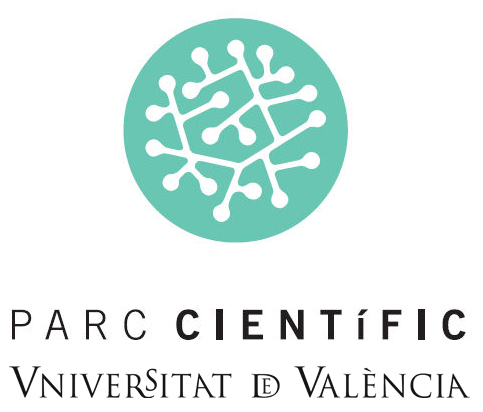
- Affiliations: Network of Valencian Science Parks (rePCV), Association of Science and Technology Parks of Spain (APTE), International Association of Science and Technology Parks (IASP)
- Location: Paterna (Comunidad Valenciana), Spain; 39°30′56″N 0°25′26″W
- Website: http://www.pcuv.es

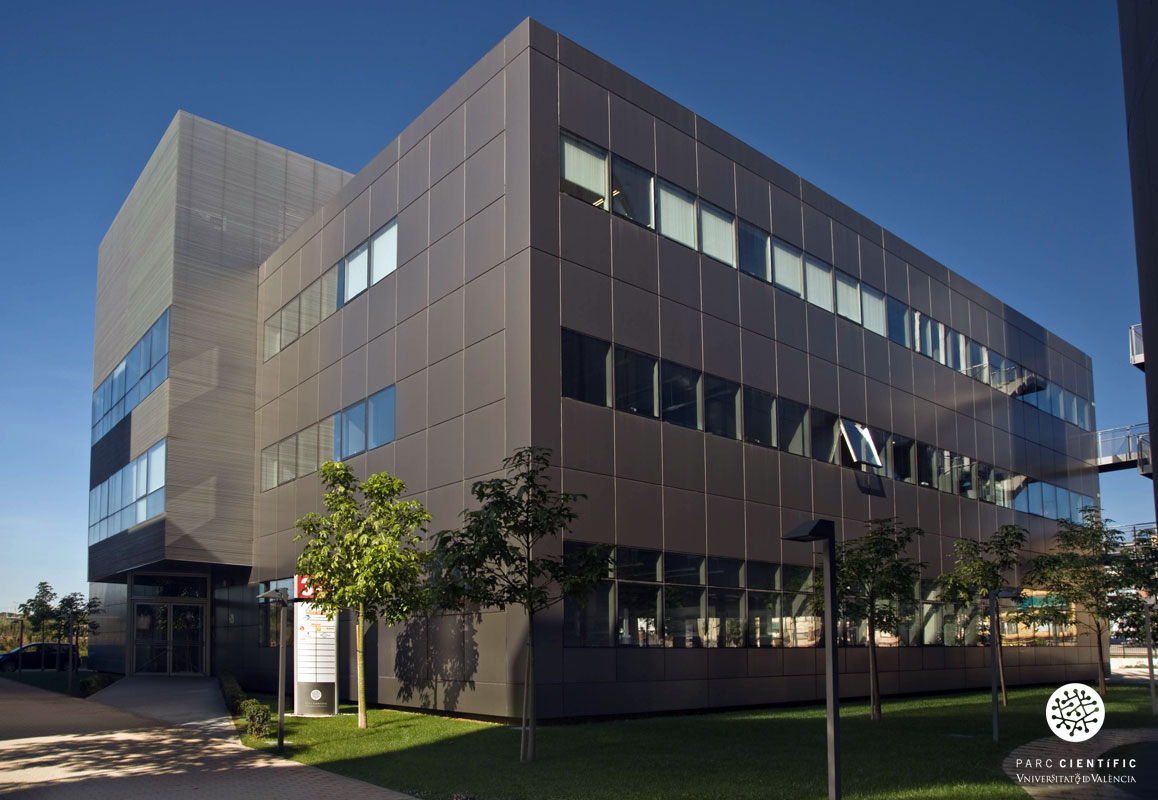
Building 3.CUE University Enterprise Centre of the University of Valencia Science Park business area

The University of Valencia Science Park (Valencian: Parc Científic de la Universitat de València also known by the acronym PCUV) provides spaces and services to companies resulting from university research, –spin-off–, and other companies and R & D departments with content related to the innovative nature of the PCUV.

The PCUV encompasses a scientific area that includes six research institutes, two centers, and services and facilities for research. Additionally, it features a business area that currently hosts more than seventy young or already established companies, primarily from the sectors of biotechnology and information and communication technologies (ICT).

In addition, The University of Valencia Science Park houses the technical office of the Emprendia Network (Iberoamerican University Network of Business Incubation), which enables the expansion of businesses in the science parks of universities that make up the network. It is also a member of the rePCV (Network of Valencian Science Parks), APTE (Association of Science and Technology Parks of Spain) and the IASP (International Association of Science and Technology Parks).

The University of Valencia Science Park Foundation

The University of Valencia Science Park Foundation was established on 9 March 2009 as a private organization with a general interest established under the aegis of the protectorate of the Generalitat Valenciana. The founding benefactors are Fundación Bancaja, Banco Santander, the Valencian Chamber of Commerce, the Valencian Business Confederation, and the University of Valencia. Foundation manages the Science Park with the purpose of promoting technological development, knowledge transfer and industrial innovation, among other things.

== Companies ==
The PCUV currently includes more than eighty companies generating close to 500 direct jobs, mainly from the ICT and biotechnology sectors.

== Research institutes and centres ==
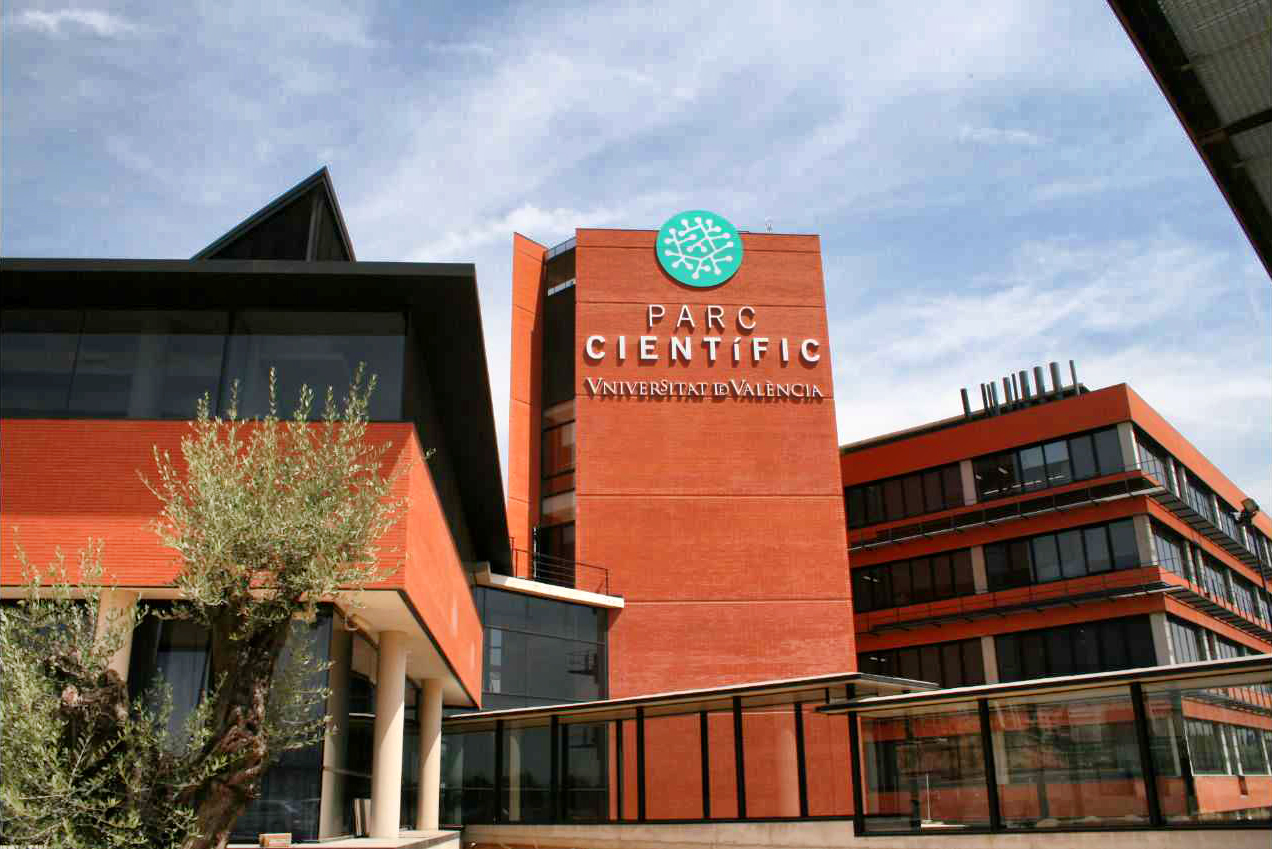
Research institutes buildings at University of Valencia Science Park

The PCUV has six research institutes, four of them from the University of Valencia, one from the National Scientific Research Council (CSIC), and one a joint venture of the University of Valencia and CSIC. The Astronomical Observatory of the University of Valencia and the Image Processing Laboratory (IPL) are also housed at the park. Together they form the academic area of this framework for innovation that is the Science Park. They all stand out for their level of collaboration with companies and institutions or for their participation in projects implemented for the benefit of society.

=== Institute of Materials Science (ICMUV) ===
Created in 1995, the Institute of Materials Science of the University of Valencia focuses on the development of different national and international projects and multiple contracts with industry. Among the lines of research of the ICMUV, the following stand out: the study of quantum semiconductor nanostructures and devices, nanomaterials for energy, high pressure physics, photonic crystals, synthesis and characterization of porous materials and zeotypes, alternative synthesis strategies, surface treatments for laser marking, functional nanomaterials, structured nanomaterials, catalysis, hybrid polymers and historical heritage.

=== Institute of Molecular Science (ICMOL) ===
Founded in 2000, the Institute for Molecular Science of the University of Valencia is for chemistry and molecular nanoscience. Its scientific objectives are focused on areas such as the design and synthesis of functional molecules, supramolecular associations and molecular materials with physical or chemical properties of interest. The fields of application range from molecular magnetism and molecular electronics to nanotechnology and biomedicine.

=== Institute of Corpuscular Physics (IFIC) ===
Founded in 1950, the Institute of Corpuscular Physics, a joint centre of the University of Valencia and CSIC, is dedicated to basic research in particle, astroparticle and nuclear physics. Its most direct fields of application are medical physics and GRID technology. Its main lines of research are experimental high energy physics based on accelerators, experimental neutrino and astroparticle physics, experimental nuclear physics, theoretical astroparticle physics, the phenomenology of high energy physics, and nuclear theory, among others.

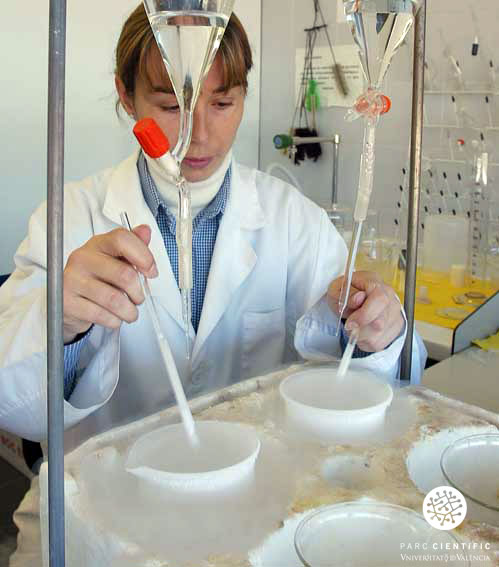
The University of Valencia Science Park a space

=== Astronomical Observatory (OAUV) ===
The Astronomical Observatory of the University of Valencia is an institution dedicated to research and education, to the study of the Universe and the popularization of astronomy in society. Founded in 1909, it is dedicated to research topics as hot as the study of the nature of dark energy, the evolution of the Universe and its galaxies, the formation and evolution of stars, and the study of near-Earth asteroids.

=== Institute of Robotics and Information and Communication Technologies (IRTIC) ===
IRTIC is a research centre of the University of Valencia, founded in the early 90s. Consisting of four research groups associated with the area of information and communication technologies, they develop projects of information management systems, traffic and transport telematics, computer and virtual reality graphics, integration systems for the disabled, civil machinery simulation, network services, computer security and digital image processing.

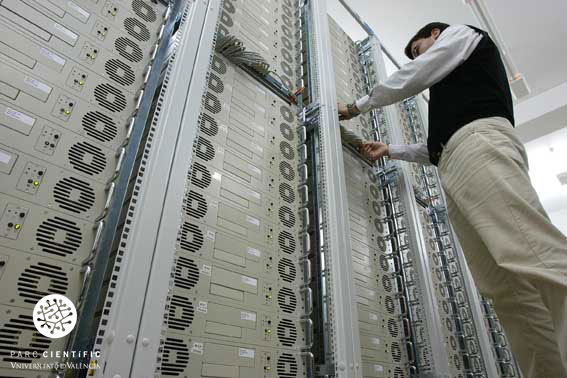
IRTIC at University of Valencia Science Park

=== Institute of Agrochemistry and Food Technology (IATA) ===
The Institute of Agrochemistry and Food Technology (IATA) is a centre of the CSIC in Valencia. Its lines of research include food biotechnology and microbiology, development of processes and technology for food processing and packaging, technologies for food preservation, quality and functionality, and advanced techniques for food analysis.

=== Image Processing Laboratory (LPI) ===
The Image Processing Laboratory (IPL) of the University of Valencia consists of four research groups with a common area: imaging (the creation of actual images or of geo-biophysical parameters) from satellite and remote sensing data. The research groups are UCG (Global Change Unit), GPDS (Digital Processing of Signals Group), GACE (Astronomy and Space Sciences Group) and LEO (Laboratory for Earth Observation).

=== Cavanilles Institute of Biodiversity and Evolutionary Biology (ICBiBE) ===
Founded in 1998, the Cavanilles Institute of the University of Valencia is dedicated to the study of biodiversity and evolutionary biology with an integrative and multidisciplinary approach. It has the following research groups: evolutionary genetics, limnology, entomology, evolutionary ecology, plant conservation biology, marine zoology, paleontology, vertebrate ecology, bacteriology, ethology, evolutionary biology of plants, comparative neurobiology and plant biodiversity/ecophysiology.

=== Institute for Integrative Systems Biology (I²SysBio) ===
Founded in 2016, I²SysBio last institute to join the PCUV. The I²SysBio is a joint collaborative research institute involving Universitat de València and Consejo Superior de Investigaciones Científicas (CSIC), open to the strategic involvement of biotech companies. The I²SysBio Scientific Programs focus on research into structure, function, dynamics, evolution, and manipulation of complex biological systems.

== Services ==
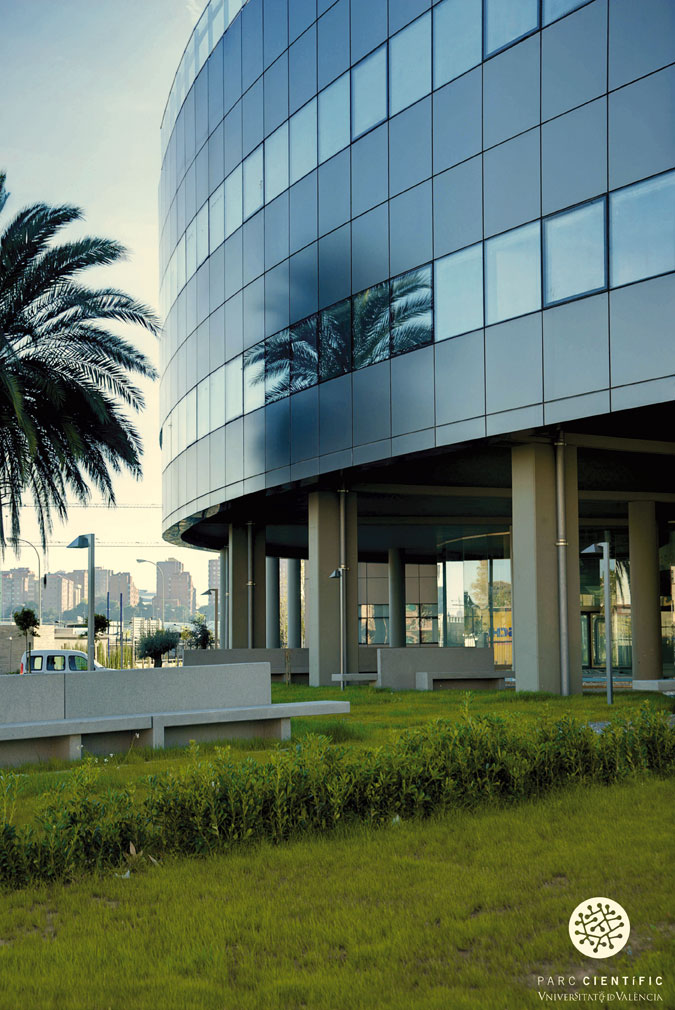
Building 1.SC Science and Technology Services of the University of Valencia Science Park business area

At present, cooperation and investment in R&D are the most effective tools that the entrepreneur has to face growing competition and to increase competitiveness. For this purpose, the PCUV has the collaboration of the University of Valencia, whose aims and objectives are to promote university-industry cooperation and the transference of research results: Support organizations include the Technology Transfer Office of the University of Valencia (OTRI), the Valencia University-Enterprise Foundation (ADEIT), the Centre of Professional Integration and Employment Counselling (OPAL), and the Office of European Projects (OPER), among others.

The Central Service for the Support of Experimental Research (SCSIE) is a general service of technology resources whose mission is to provide centralized and comprehensive support for research carried out in the university community, businesses, and public and private institutions.

The PCUV also offers the following business support services:

- Information and advice about public support and funding for R&D&I
- Business plan review.
- Searching and obtaining public funding resources (grants, calls for application, etc.) and private finance (mediating with investors, risk capital, investment companies, banks, etc.).
- Supporting and promoting company set-up.
- Business information service, alerts, technology monitoring, events, forums, etc.
- Business breakfasts.
- Participation in national, European and international research projects.
- Internationalisation.
- Cooperation and projects.
- Advice on protection and management of industrial property by OTRI.
- Access to the employment agency of the University of Valencia maintained by OPAL.
- Access to traineeships in enterprises through the Valencia University-Enterprise Foundation ADEIT.
