= José Manuel Vela Bargues =

Spanish economist and professor (1962–2022)

Minister of Finance and Public Administration
- In office 22 June 2011 – 30 November 2012
- President: Francisco Camps; Alberto Fabra
- Preceded by: Gerardo Camps
- Succeeded by: Juan Carlos Moragues Ferrer

Personal details
- Born: 1962 Valencia, Spain
- Died: 16 July 2022 (aged 60)
- Party: People's Party
- Education: University of Valencia

José Manuel Vela Bargues (1962 – 16 July 2022) was a Spanish economist and politician from the Valencian Community. Vela served as the Valencian Minister of Finance and Public Administration from 22 June 2011 until his resignation on 30 November 2012. Vela was a member of the People's Party (PP).

== Biography ==
Vela was born in Valencia in 1962. He attended the University of Valencia, where he graduated in 1986 with a degree in economic and business science. He later received a doctorate in economics from the University of Valencia. Vela was a professor of financial economics and accounting at the Polytechnic University of Valencia and was the vice-rector at Jaume I University. Vela was a member of the Spanish Association of Accounting and Business Administration since 1991, and authored over 100 works on economics.

Vela served in various positions in the Government of Valencia prior to his appointment as minister. Vela served as director of the Valencian Institute of Statistics, Undersecretary of Budget Policy and Treasury, and Autonomous Secretary of Economy and Budgets.

On 22 June 2011, Francisco Camps, the president of the Valencian Community, appointed Vela as Minister of Finance and Public Administration. Vela was retained in the government of Camps's successor, Alberto Fabra. In his position as Minister of Finance, Vela was tasked with leading Valencia through the Great Recession. As part of his response to the recession, Vela would oversee the reduction of wages for public employees and the restructuring of the public sector.

On 21 November 2012, Vela was alleged to have leaked confidential documents regarding the Cooperation Case, in which Rafael Blasco, a People's Party (PP) member of the Corts Valencianes and a prominent minister, was accused and ultimately found guilty of bribery and embezzlement. During the course of the investigation, Vela allegedly leaked confidential information regarding the case to Blasco. Vela resigned as Minister of Finance on 30 November 2012 amidst media scrutiny; Vela was succeeded as Minister of Finance by Juan Carlos Moragues Ferrer. Later that day, the High Court of Justice of the Valencian Community announced that charges would be filed against Vela, but these charges were ultimately dismissed.

Vela died on 16 July 2022 at the age of 60. Politicians from across the political spectrum commemorated Vela's death, with both PP leader Carlos Mazón and the opposing Spanish Socialist Workers' Party both offering condolences.
