= Gerardo Camps =

Spanish politician

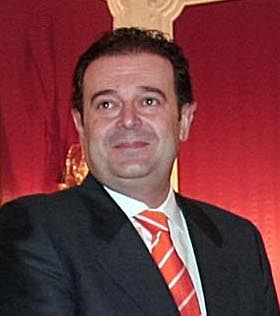
Gerardo Camps

Gerardo Camps Devesa (born 30 June 1963) is a Spanish politician who belongs to the People's Party (PP).

Camps was born in Barcelona, Spain, and qualified in law. He is married with two children. He entered politics in the 1980s, serving as Provincial secretary of the Popular Alliance (the predecessor of the current PP) from 1984–1986 and Regional Secretary 1985–1986. He also served as Regional President of the party's youth wing. In 1993 he was elected to the Spanish Congress of Deputies representing Valencia province. In Congress, he served as PP spokesman on issues related to Social Security, serving for example on the Commission established by the Pact of Toledo which aimed to study the future viability of the Spanish pension system. He was re-elected to Congress in 1996 and 2000, but on the latter occasion, resigned after just one month after being named Secretary of State for Social Security. In 2003, he was appointed Minister for Economy, Manufacturing and Employment in the Valencian regional administration. He was succeeded in this role by José Manuel Vela Bargues in 2011.
