= École européenne de chimie, polymères et matériaux =

Engineering college in Strasbourg, France

Coordinates: 48°36′09″N 7°42′39″E

European School of Chemistry, Polymers and Materials Science (ECPM)
- École européenne de chimie, polymères et matériaux
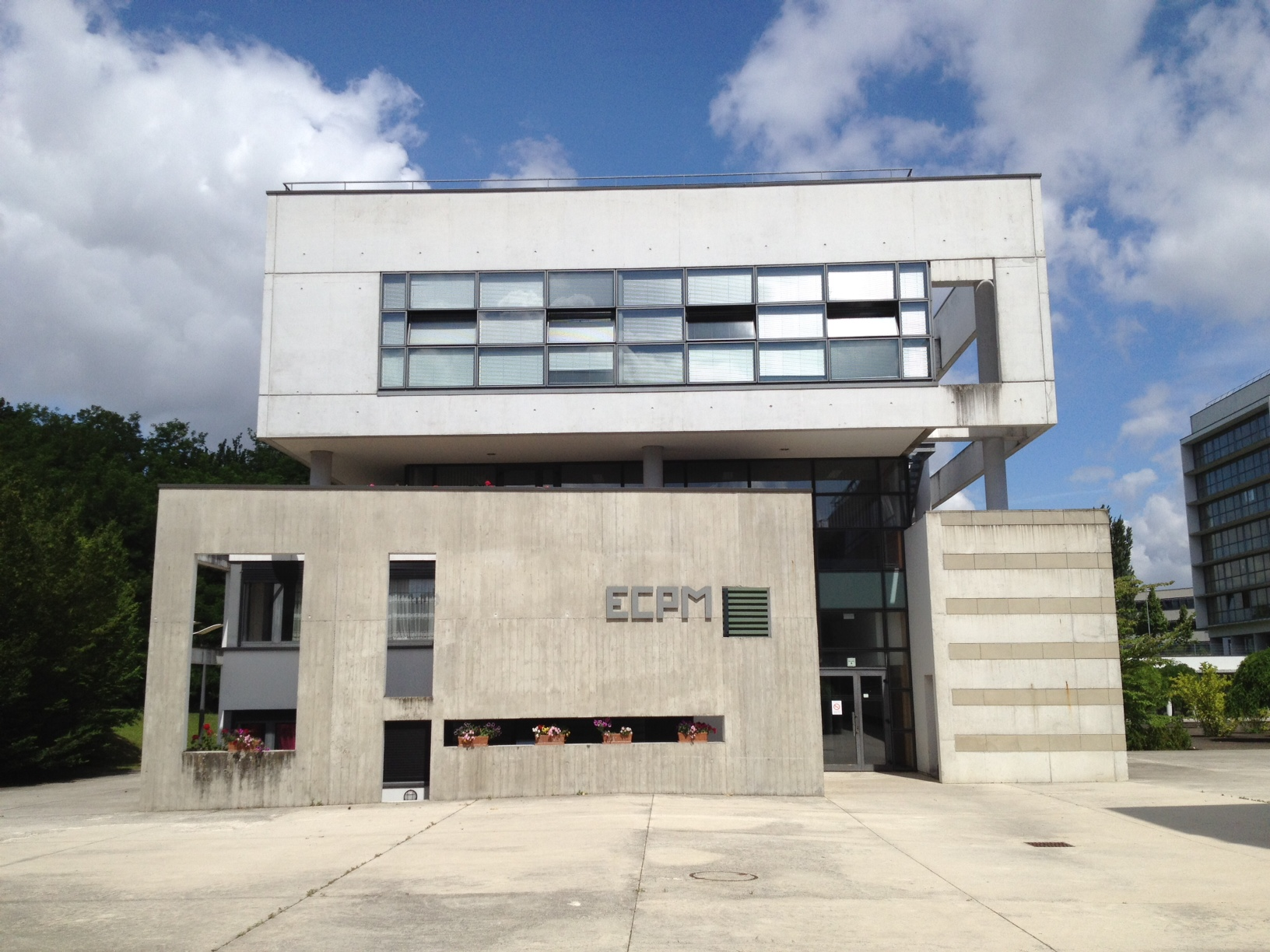
- Former names: EHICS (1986-1995), ENSCS (1948-1986)
- Type: Public engineering school
- Established: 1995
- Director: Cécile Vallière
- Location: Strasbourg, Alsace, France
- Campus: Cronenbourg campus, University of Strasbourg
- Website: www-ecpm.u-strasbg.fr

The École européenne de chimie, polymères et matériaux (ECPM; European School of Chemistry, Polymers and Materials Science) of Strasbourg is a public engineering school in the city of Strasbourg, in Alsace, France. It was founded in 1948, and is located on the Cronenbourg Campus of the University of Strasbourg. Each year 90 students graduate from the school with a diplôme d'ingénieur. It is a National School of Engineers, part of the University of Strasbourg and a member of the Fédération Gay-Lussac, which recruits from the common polytechnic entrance examination. It is also part of the Alsace Tech network of nine engineering schools in Alsace. The ECPM offers its students three specialties: chemistry (analytical or organic), polymers or materials.

In 2019, it was part of Group A of the L'Etudiant ranking of engineering schools. In 2023, ECPM has risen to first place in the same ranking, among schools training for chemical engineers.

== History ==
1919 - Creation of the chemical institute by the professors T.Muller and H.Gault. Lectures are taught rue Goethe in Strasbourg.

1948 - Creation at the same place of the Ecole nationale supérieure de chimie (ENSCS) by the professor H. Forestier.

1962 - The Ecole de chimie has place in new premises (tour de la Chimie) on the campus central de l'Esplanade. The first practical sessions from the ENSCS in analytical chemistry begin at the start of the school year 1962.

1968 - The ENSCS becomes a public organization.

1981 - The professor M. Daire introduces the European teaching program.

1986 - The ENSCS becomes Ecole Européenne des hautes études des industries chimiques de Strasbourg (EHICS)

1995 - The EHICS, the Ecole d'application des hauts Polymères and the Magistère matériaux de l'université de Strasbourg-I group together and form the Ecole de chimie, Polymères et Matériaux (ECPM).

1998-1999 - The ECPM moves to new premises on the University's Cronenbourg campus.

2006 - Strasbourg becomes business cluster of the French chemistry.

2009 - The université Louis Pasteur and the other universities of Strasbourg are joined and form l'Université de Strasbourg

2011 - Opening of the new Classe préparatoire intégrée internationale (CP2I) - CHEM.I.ST. at the start of the school year 2011.

== Admission to ECPM ==
→ To enter the First year:

- The school recruit essentially with the «Concours Communs Polytechniques» (CCP) or the DEUG (which are national competitive exams).

- The admission could also be done by an interview with a License 3 in Chemistry or in Physics at the university, a DUT (university diploma of technology) for example, in Chemistry, physical measurements optional materials or chemical engineering.

- For international students, they must have a Bachelor of science or an equivalent foreign degree.

- After 2 years in CPI classes at Rennes (ENSCR), Lille (ENSCL), Clermont-Ferrand (ENSCCF) or in Strasbourg (ECPM: referred to the CPI classe's paragraph).

→ To enter the Second year, students can have access at the ECPM having an interview, with a Master M1 in Physics with a speciality in Polymers or materials.

→ Admission to the CP2i class in the ECPM, after the Baccalaureate, or an equivalent foreign degree for the international students.

There is no competitive exam, but every student should submit their school results. Then there are interviews to evaluate the motivations with the people in charge of the Chem.I.St programme. Approximately 50 students are selected every year. There are nearly 20% international students.

== CP2I / Classe préparatoire intégrée internationale ==
This class allows the students to gain admission to a school of the Fédération Gay Lussac (19 schools) after two years. These 2 years consist of studying engineer's trades in the domain of chemistry.

There are 5 CPIs in France: Rennes, Clermont-Ferrand, Lille, Pau and Strasbourg at the ECPM

The last one was opened at the start of the 2011-12 school year in Strasbourg. The speciality of this school is that it welcomes a large number of international students, as well as that 20% of the courses are delivered in English and 10% are delivered in German (optional). There are 50 students in each year.

To gain admission to the CP2I:

- French students register on Admission Post-Bac and follow the steps.

Students are selected on the basis of their academic record and a 20-minute interview.

- International students submit their dossiers directly to the school.

International students are also selected on the basis of their academic record and an interview.

General presentation of CPI-CHEM.I.ST :

- A strong scientific program: a major part of chemistry, physics and maths during the 2 years with a total, for the first year, of around 700 hours of scientific lesson. We must add Lab Work of this scientific formation, with a total of 102 hours for the first year.

The CPI-CHEM.I.ST base of more practical work than in an intensive foundation degree, with high-quality laboratory. The program includes group work to develop the communication, the creativity around scientists projects. Moreover, in 2016, a "videxo" program was created. During, the "videxo" student solves a science problem on a board and in the same time someone films him to send the video to the teachers. The goal of this is to promote self-confidence, speaking, and the scientist reflexion which are important qualities for the future engineer.

- An international program in a multicultural environment: many students with different cultures and two foreign languages to learn. At the beginning of the formation, students can participate in an English language session for one week in order to learn the fundamentals of the scientific English. Insertions travels are organised at the end of the first year in Germany or in England. The students will participate in lectures and lab work in a foreign university. Most of the time the foreign students come from China.

== Speciality ==
The speciality is chosen in the second year. Students have four possibilities:

Chemistry:

Organic Chemistry: With this speciality, students attain a high level in synthesis and characterization of organic chemistry.

Analytical Chemistry: Students are trained in techniques of analysis within the context of quality control.

Polymers: Students are trained to become flexible engineers in the polymer industry.

Materials: Students are trained in physics and chemistry of functional materials. Students become engineers specializing in conception and development of materials with an added value.

== Community life ==
There are several associations managed by school's students :

- l'Amicale (BDE) (or Student Union ): It manages the associative and festive life of the school, organizes students foyer's functioning, publishes students' directory and organizes events like, for example, new students integration's weekend. About ten clubs exist in the association like the Arts' Office, DéméTerre (sustainable development), Theatre Club, Manga Club, Cine Club, Gastronomy Club, study trip, etc.

- Le Bureau des Sports (BDS° (or Sports Office) : It allows students to do sport, to participate in university competitions and organizes events like a nice trip at the month for a weekend or at the Tournoi Inter-Chimie (TIC) in spring. Moreover, the ECPM won this sports and festive event in 2006 which has been organized in Mulhouse.

- Le "Forum Horizon Chimie" (FHC) : It's the ECPM's association that organize a forum which happens every year at la Maison de la Chimie in Paris.

Moreover, a junior company, Strasbourg Chimie Service, allows students-employed to make some punctual missions like chemical analyses, scientific conferences or translations of publications.

It also exists l'Amicale des Ingénieurs de Chimie de Strasbourg (Association of the Strasbourg's Engineers of Chemistry). It's an association aiming at conservation and relations' strengthening between graduates and students. It has in particular for ultimate objective the creation of a robust and big network ECPM, a very great tool for a successful career.

-Student common room

The ECPM Student common room is the center of the school. It is a place where students can relax after lunch or during off-peak times. It is a big place where you can find a table football, a billiard table, many couches and tables and even a microwave. In fact, it is possible to eat food you’ve brought. Moreover, there is a mezzanine with a hi-fi system, which makes you think of a nightclub and a terrace which is surrounded by trees and is really cozy. Everyone has the right to go to the student common room, the students in the engineering cycle and the CPI’s. Furthermore, the BDE and the BDS (respectively student union and sports office) sometime organize parties in the student common room (for example barbecues) to bring the whole school together. For example, there is the Welcome Party every year for new students.

== Partners and networks ==
The ECPM participated to many different networks in order to communicate with factories, institutions or students.

That different networks are :

-The Gay-Lussac federation: The federation was found by Louis Joseph Gay Lussac. It regroups no more than 20 schools of chemistry and chemical engineering. These 20 schools, through their teaching activities, research and training, are working together to raise awareness, develop and promote engineering courses in chemistry.

-The network “Alsace Tech“: Alsace Tech regroups 12 reputed engineering, management and architecture schools of Alsace. Its main objective is to promote, to contribute to the national and international influence and to increase the legibility of its schools' members.

== Scientific Research ==
The ECPM is a hub for scientific research. Five laboratories associated with the CNRS form the ECPM's research federation. The fields of research are varied: materials, catalysis, polymers, organic synthesis, analysis of biomolecules. The laboratories collaborate with industries and major European research organizations as part of European agreements. A 1000m² hall with a cleanroom further the exchanges with industry.

Associated Laboratories

- The SYBIO Laboratory (Synthèse Organique et Molécules Bioactives)

- Laboratoire de Chimie Bioorganique et Médicale

- The Nierengarten group

- Laboratoire de Synthèse et Catalyse Asymétrique (SynCat)

- Laboratoire de Chimie organométallique

== Food services ==
You can find different kinds of food services in and around the campus.

- Restaurant universitaire (RU): this is the place where the majority of the students come every day. The choice is between three different main courses: today's special, world's dish, and the grill. Patrons can also take a starter and a dessert, the whole for 3€15. Dining is in a large room with all the campus' students: CPI, engineers, and students of the IUT Louis Pasteur.

- Mini R : It's a new concept ! It's located above the RU. The principle is the same as a cafeteria. You choose what you want: sandwiches, fagottini, fruits, desserts, drinks, and some hot food like pizzas, paninis, pasta and wok boxes, kebab, hot dog, etc. One can eat there or take away.

- Vending machine: in the school, next to the coffee machine. There are several kinds of sandwiches, but all of them are industrial.

- In the common room: it is mainly the place where the engineers eat because they are contributors (prices are less expansive for them). For those bringing food from their flat, you can warm up there; there are ovens and stovetops.

- Fast food and supermarkets: Finally, there is an area next to the IUT Louis Pasteur with fast food like Mac Donald, Mezzo di Pasta or supermarkets (Liddl, Intermarché).

== Ranking ==
According to the Point newspaper, the ECPM was ranked 18th in 2007 and was the leading chemistry schools in that rank (excluding chemical engineering) before the ENSCP which occupied the 30th rank. According to L'Express, the school was ranked 27th as a post-prépa engineering school in 2008, behind the National School of Chemistry of Paris in the category of chemistry schools. Concerning starting incomes, the ECPM was ranked 10th by L'Usine Nouvelle in 2007. In the same newspaper, the ECPM is ranked 6th as a school betting on self-knowledge, that is to say, a school devoting a large part to non-scientific lectures.

- see the French article
