= University of Valencia =

University in Valencia, Spain

- Universitat de València
- Type: Public
- Established: 30 April 1499; 527 years ago
- Academic affiliations: Vives Network
- Rector: Juan Luis Gandía Cabedo
- Faculty: 3,300
- Students: 65,789 (Total)
- Undergraduates: 45,000
- Postgraduates: 8,000
- Location: Valencia, Valencian Community, Spain; 39.47905110°N 0.35908730°W
- Campus: Urban
- Website: www.uv.es/uvweb/college/en/university-valencia-1285845048380.html

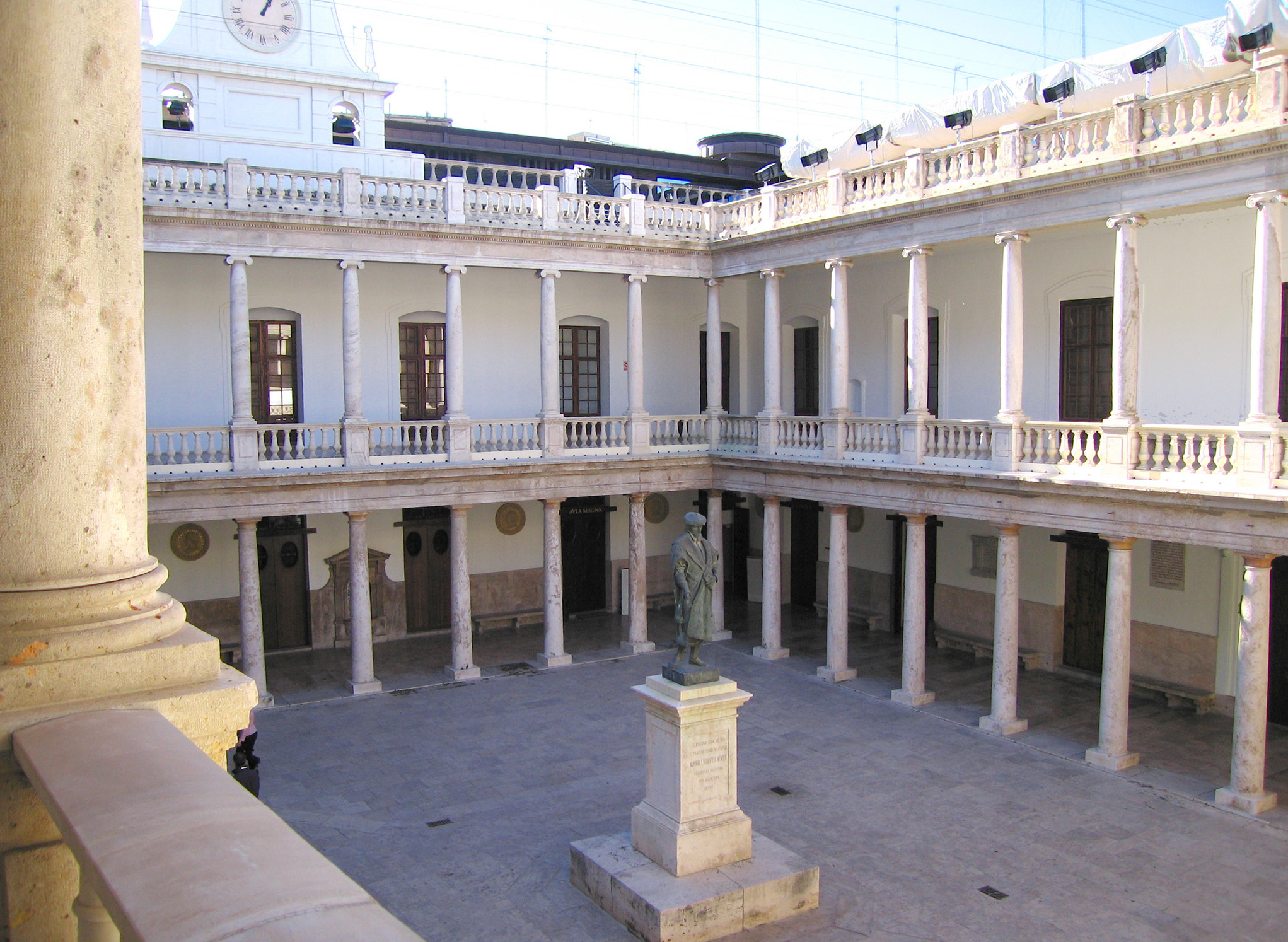
Historic claustre of la Nau building

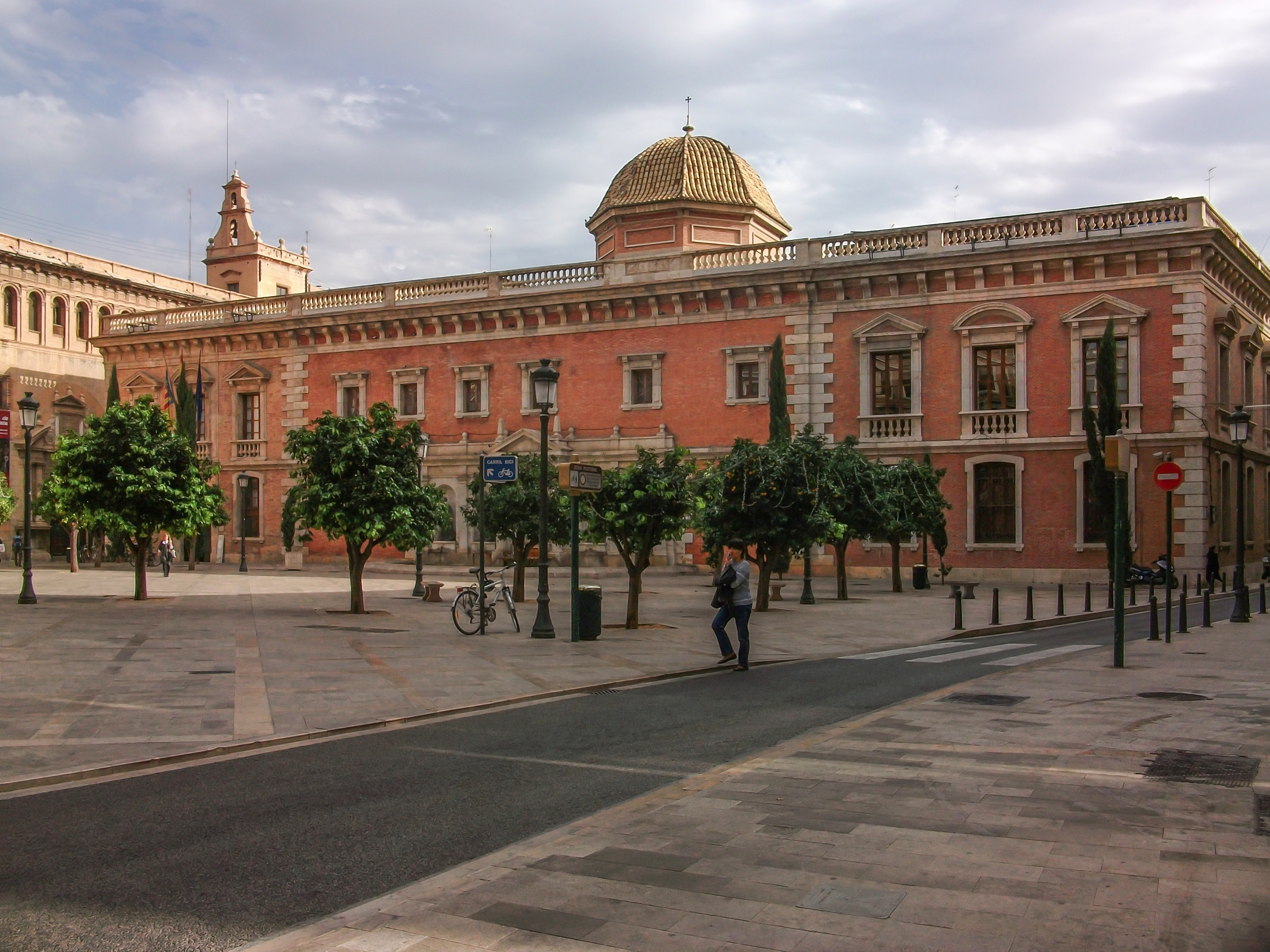
The University of Valencia's Historic Building

The University of Valencia (Valencian: Universitat de València [univeɾsiˈtad de vaˈlensi.a]), shortened to UV, is a public research university in Valencia, Spain. It is one of the oldest universities in Spain, and the oldest in the Valencian Community. It is regarded as one of Spain's leading academic institutions.

The university was founded in 1499, and currently has around 55,000 students. Most of the courses are taught in Spanish, however their plan is to increase the number of courses available in Valencian and English as well.

It is located in the Mediterranean Spanish baseline, in the city of Valencia which is the capital and most populous city of the autonomous community of Valencia and the third largest city in Spain, with a population of 829,705 in 2014. One of its campuses is located in the metropolitan area of Valencia, in the municipalities of Burjassot and Paterna.

The current chancellor is Juan Luis Gandía Cabedo.

== History ==
At the request of James I the Conqueror, Pope Innocent IV in 1246 authorized (by a Bull) the establishment of estudis generals in Valencia. The University Statutes were passed by the municipal magistrates of Valencia on 30 April 1499; this is considered to be the 'founding' of the university. In 1501, Pope Alexander VI signed the bill of approval and one year later Ferdinand II the Catholic proclaimed the Royal Mandatory Concession.

Its foundation was due to the zeal of Vincent Ferrer (later canonised) and to the donation of a building by Mosen Pedro Vilaragut. Only very meagre accounts have been preserved of the practical workings of the university. From the time of its foundation the courses included Latin, Greek, Hebrew, Arabic, philosophy, mathematics, and physics, theology, Canon law, and medicine.

The closing years of the seventeenth, and the whole of the eighteenth century, witnessed the most prosperous era of the university, Greek, Latin, mathematics, and medicine being specially cultivated. Among the names of illustrious students that of Tosca, Evangelista Torricelli's friend, noted physicist and author of important mathematical works, stands out prominently. Escolano says that it was the leading university in mathematics, the humanities, philosophy, and medicine. Large anatomical drawings were made by the students. Valencia was the first university of Spain to found a course for the study of herbs. Many of the Valencian graduates of medicine became famous. Pedro Ximeno discovered the third small bone of the ear. He was professor at Alcalá and had for a pupil the celebrated Vallés. Luis Collado, professor of botany, made some valuable discoveries and carried on exhaustive studies of the plants of the Levant; Vicente Alfonso Lorente wrote works on botany; and the famous botanist Cavanilles was also a student of this university.

In the seventeenth century, the university divided into two factions, the Thomists and the anti-Thomists. The discussions were heated and aroused partisan feelings throughout the entire Kingdom of Valencia. The university possessed a library of 27,000 volumes which was destroyed by the soldiers under the command of General Suchet. Among the most noted professors of the university was D. Francisco Pérez Bayer, a man of wide culture and great influence in the reign of Charles III of Spain. Around the university several colleges for poor students sprang up: the first was founded by St. Thomas of Villanova in 1561 and then followed those founded by Doña Angela Alonsar, and Mosen Pedro Martín. The most famous, called Corpus Christi, was founded by Blessed Juan de Ribera; Philip II founded that of San Jorge; and Melchor de Villena founded the last in 1643. During the Spanish Civil War, in 1938, a fire badly damaged the library.

== Campuses ==
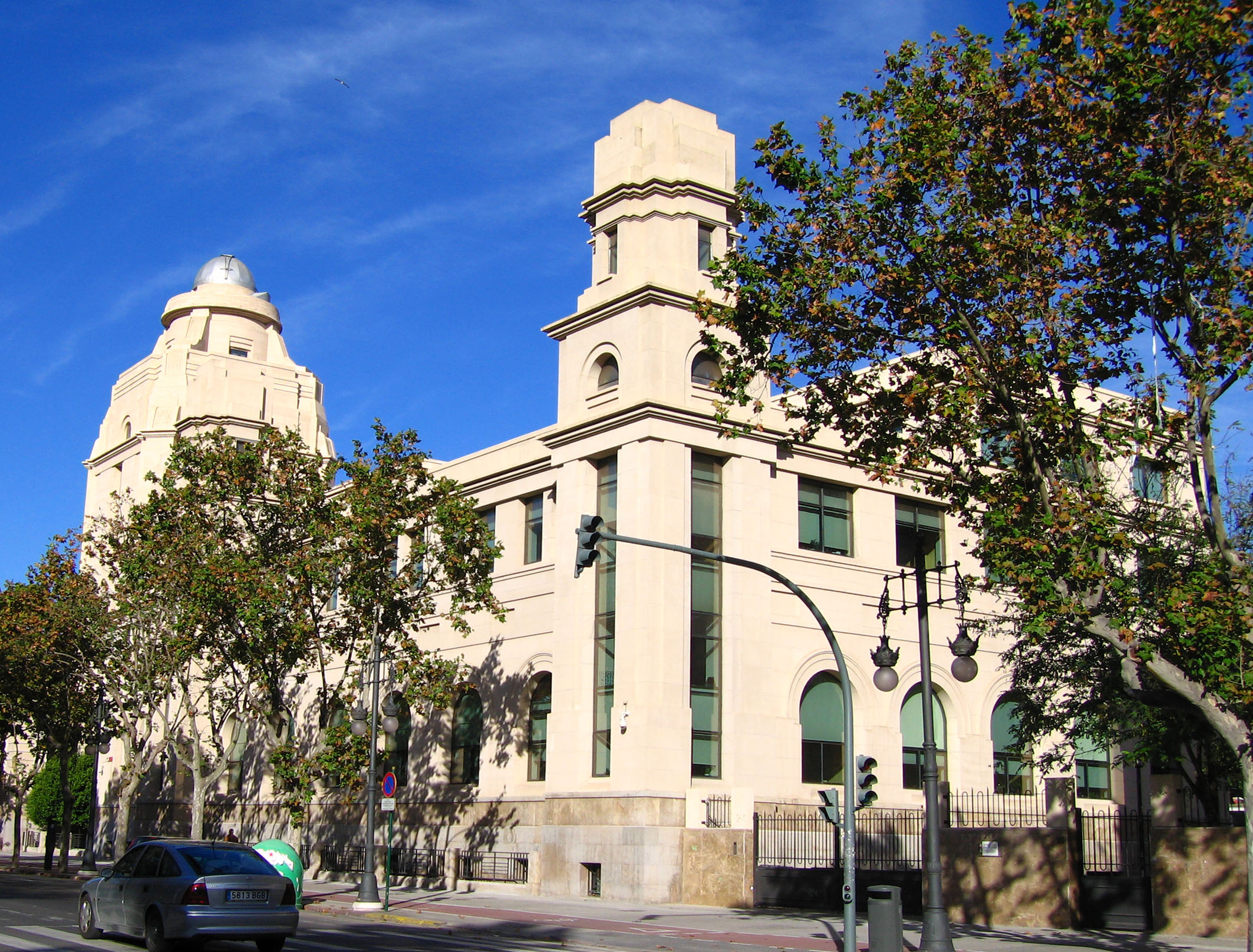
The University of Valencia's Rectorate

The University of Valencia has three main urban campuses located in Valencia city and in Burjassot-Paterna, and some other buildings and facilities in the hearth of Valencia town, such as the Historic Building, Botanical Garden, Cerveró Palace, the Rectorate and others, and the astronomical observatory station, located in the town of Aras de los Olmos.

- The Burjassot Campus houses the colleges of Biology, Pharmacy, Physics, Chemistry, Mathematics and the School of Engineering.
- On the Avenida de Blasco Ibañez Campus are the Schools of Medicine and Dentistry, Philosophy and Educational Sciences, Psychology, Geography and History, Philology and Translation and Communication, Physical Education, Physiotherapy and Nursing.
- The third campus, Tarongers, houses the Schools of Law, Economics and Business, Social Sciences, and recently the School of Elementary Teacher Training, which moved from its previous location near the Blasco Ibañez Campus.

== Schools and Faculties ==
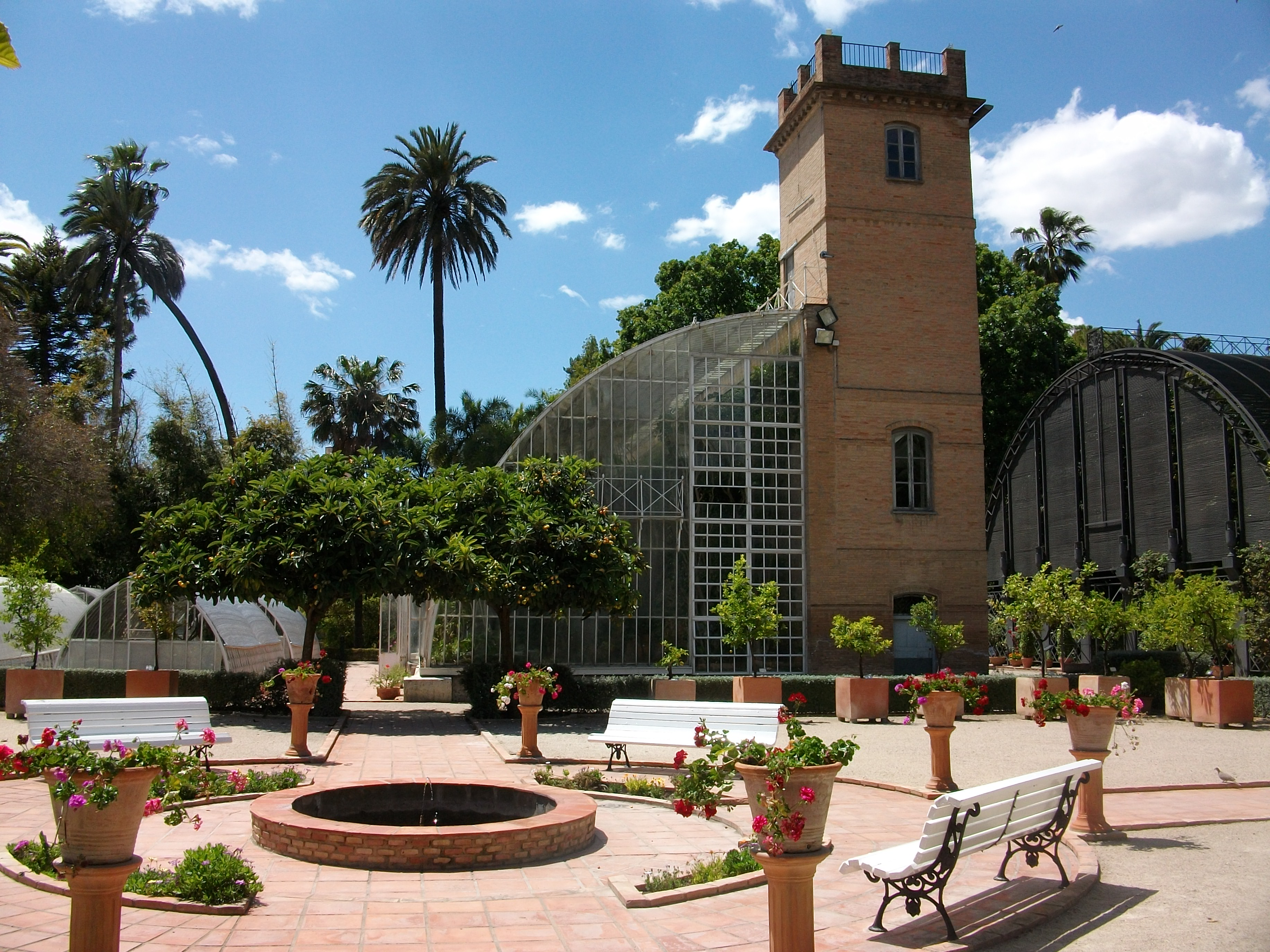
The Botanical Garden of Valencia, administered by the university

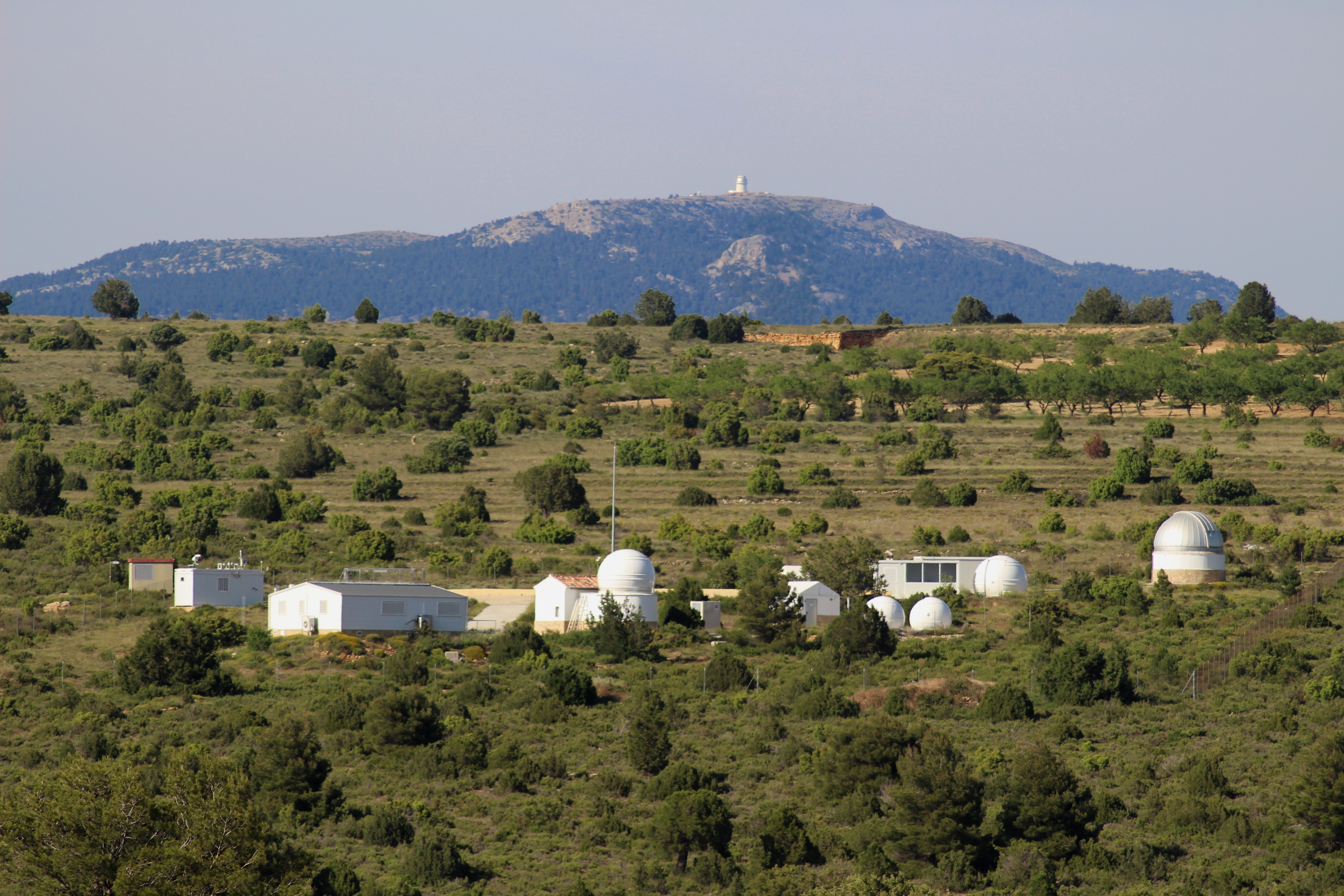
Observatorio de Aras de los Olmos – University of Valencia

The University of Valencia has 18 Schools and Faculties located in its three main campuses. Each one allocates different academic departments and offers undergraduate, official masters and PhD programs.

== Studying at the University of Valencia ==
The University of Valencia offers degrees in almost all of the academic fields: Arts and Humanities, Engineering, Health sciences, Science, and Social sciences.

The exchange programs with foreign universities, as well as other programs of International Cooperation and Development Aid, allow students to study in other academic institutions from Europe, North America, Latin America, and Asia. Regarding student mobility through Erasmus program, it is among the top ten universities in Europe. The university has partnered with International Studies Abroad, a study abroad provider based in Austin, Texas, to bring inbound students from the United States and Canada.

== Research ==
Research is conducted through several ways. The Academic Departments within each School, the Research Institutes, the Science Park and some others.

The Research Institutes are conceived as multi-disciplinary research structures beyond the framework of the departments; they aim to meet the demand of the economic and social context in the research and transfer fields.

== Notable faculty ==
- Juan José Martí (1570–1604) — novelist and canon lawyer
- Santiago Ramón y Cajal (1852–1934) — received Nobel Prize in Physiology or Medicine in 1906
- Dámaso Alonso (1898–1990) — poet, philologist, literary critic
- Ernest Lluch (1937–2000) — economist and politician
- Álvaro López-García (1941–2019) —astronomer
- Carmen Aranegui (born 1945) —archaeologist
- Carles Solà (born 1945) — chemist and academic administrator
- Josep Guia (born 1947) — mathematician
- Jon Juaristi (born 1951) — poet, essayist and translator
- Artemi Cerda (born 1965)- physical geographer and environmentalist

== Notable alumni ==
=== Arts and Science ===
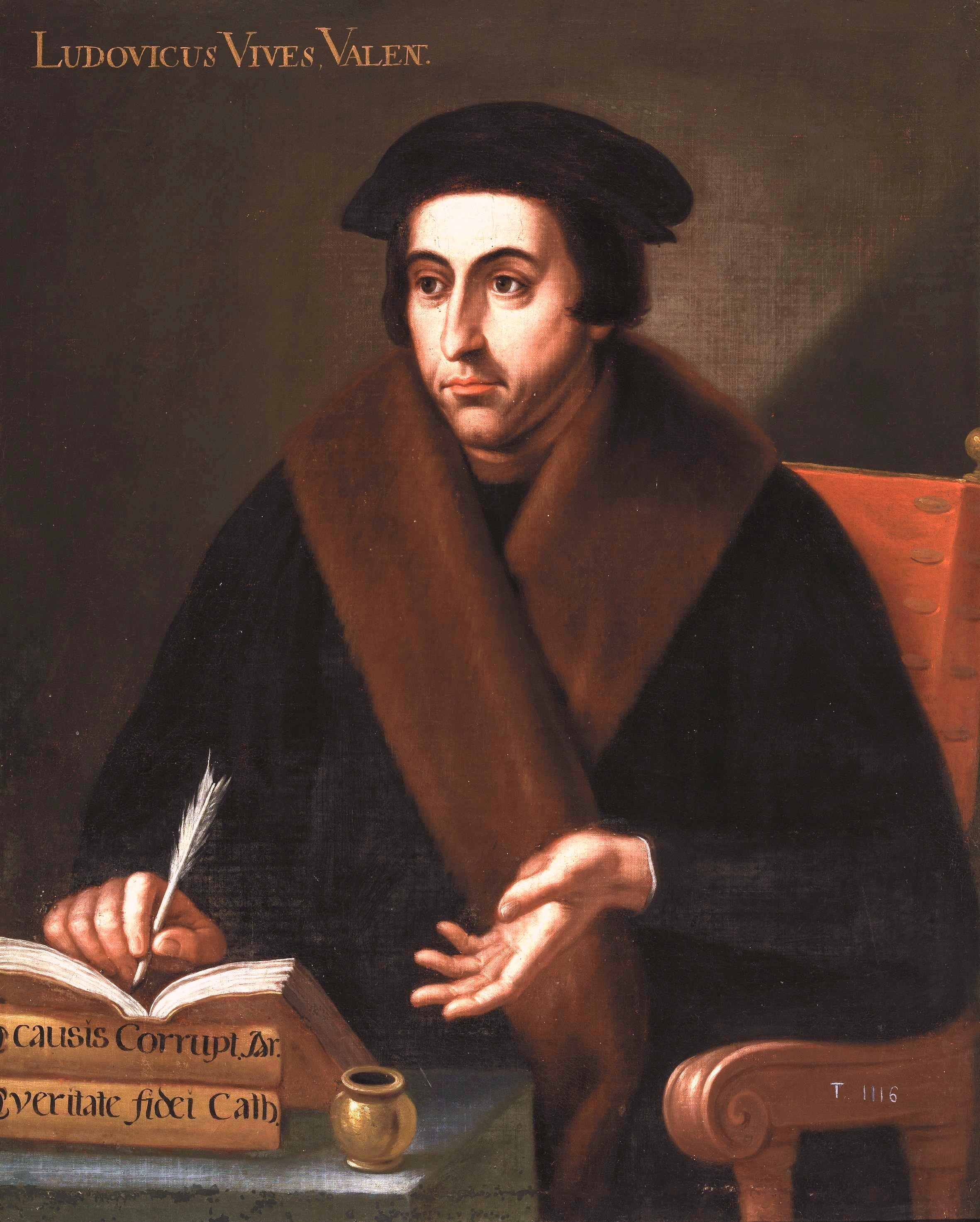
Juan Luis Vives

- Juan Luis Vives (1493–1540) — Renaissance scholar; father of modern psychology
- Joseph Calasanz (1557–1648) — priest
- Juan Tomás de Rocaberti (1627–1699) — theologian
- Mathieu Orfila (1787–1853) — toxicologist, founder of science of toxicology
- Graciano López Jaena (1856–1896) — Filipino journalist
- José Martínez Ruiz (1873–1967) — novelist and literary critic
- José Gaos (1900–1969) — philosopher
- Isabel-Clara Simó (1943–2020) — journalist
- Rafael Ninyoles i Monllor (1943–2019) — sociolinguist
- Eva Barreno (born 1950) – botanist and lichenologist
- José Luis Soberanes (born 1950) — Mexican lawyer
- Amparo Acker-Palmer (born 1968) — Spanish cell biologist and neuroscientist
- Josep Carles Laínez (born 1970) — philologist
- Carlos Alós-Ferrer — economist
- Etelvina Andreu — physicist, medical doctor, politician
- José-Miguel Bernardo — mathematician, statistician
- Marti Bonmati Luis — medical doctor
- Estrella Durá — psychologist, politician
- María Ángeles Durán — sociologist
- Pablo Jarillo-Herrero — physicist
- Andrés Piquer — physician, philosopher
- Antoni Roig Muntaner — chemist
- Manuel Sánchez Ayuso — economist, politician
- Daniel Tordera — chemist
- Hassan Ugail — mathematician
- Muriel Villanueva i Perarnau — writer
- Antonio Vidal-Puig — medical doctor and scientist
- Aquilino Cayuela — writer, columnist, and professor specializing in moral philosophy, politics, bioethics, and theology
- Carmen Agulló Díaz — professor, non-fiction author
- Jorge Mateu — mathematician, author, and academic
- Juan José López-Ibor — psychiatrist
- Lidia García — researcher, activist, and podcaster

=== Politics ===
- Gabriela Bravo — politician
- Gema Climent — scientist, tech entrepreneur
- Esther Herranz García (born 1969) — politician
- Belén Hoyo Juliá — politician
- Joan Lerma — politician
- Enrique Monsonís — politician
- María Sornosa Martinez (born 1949) — politician
- José Manuel Vela Bargues (1962–2022) — economist and politician
- José Viñals (born 1954) — economist

== Ranking ==
University rankings

Global – Overall
- ARWU World: 201–300 (2024)
- QS World: =430 (2026)
- THE World: 501–600 (2024)
- USNWR Global: 212 (2023)

== See also ==
- Vives Network
- List of medieval universities
- Route of the Borgias
