= Luis Marti-Bonmati =

Spanish professor and researcher (born 1959)

- Born: December 30, 1959
- Education: University of Valencia
- Scientific career
- Workplaces: La Fe Polytechnic and University Hospital
- Thesis: Magnetic Resonance Imaging of Liver Tumours (1991)
- Website: www.acim.lafe.san.gva.es/acim/

Luis Marti-Bonmati is a Spanish professor and researcher. He is the director of the Clinical Area of Medical Imaging Department at La Fe Polytechnic and University Hospital, and Head of Radiology Department at QuironSalud Hospital, Valencia, Spain. Marti-Bonmati is the founder of QUIBIM S.L., and is the Director of its Scientific Advisory Board. He is a member of the Spanish National Royal Academy of Medicine. He is also the director of the Biomedical Imaging Research Group (GIBI230) at La Fe Health Research Institute. The group is now included in the Imaging La Fe node at Distributed Network for Biomedical Imaging (ReDIB) Unique Scientific and Technical Infrastructures (ICTS), Valencia, Spain.

== Education ==
He did his undergraduate medical training at the University of Valencia. He completed his postgraduate training as a resident in radiology. He obtained his doctoral thesis (Ph.D.) from the University of Valencia in 1990 with a thesis on magnetic resonance (MR) imaging in liver tumors.

== Career ==
He joined the radiology department at the first university hospital with an MR system in Spain in 1987. He became the section chief in Magnetic Resonance imaging in this Radiology department (1995) and became professor of radiology at the University of Valencia (2011).

Marti-Bonmati was appointed as President of the Sociedad Española de Diagnóstico por Imagen del Abdomen (SEDIA) in 2000 for seven years. He also served as the President of the European Society of Magnetic Resonance in Medicine and Biology from 2002 to 2004. For two years starting from 2008, he was appointed as the President of the Sociedad Española de Radiología (SERAM). From 2013 to 2015, he served as the President of the European Society of Gastrointestinal and Abdominal Radiology.

He is also a part of the executive council and has served as director of the Research Committee of the European Society of Radiology (ESR, 2010–2013). Marti-Bonmati also serves as the director of Imaging La Fe node at Distributed Network for Biomedical Imaging (ReDIB) Unique Scientific and Technical Infrastructures (ICTS), Valencia, Spain.

Since January 2023, he has been the Scientific Director of the EUropean Federation for CAncer IMages project (EUCAIM) (proposal nº101100633). EUCAIM is a pan-European digital federated infrastructure of FAIR, de-identified cancer medical images coming from Real-World data. The infrastructure is an experimentation platform to facilitate the development and benchmarking of AI-based cancer management tools towards precision medicine in cancer diagnosis and treatment.

In 2023 he set up Fundación IMAGING, a non-profit foundation related to imaging.

== Research ==
Marti-Bonmati's research interests include liver MR and CT, abdominal and pelvic MRI, contrast agents, image processing, and imaging biomarkers. He also worked in the evaluation of liver segmentation, the quantification of emphysema and pulmonary vascularization, joint cartilage thickness, schizophrenia, and the microstructure, rigidity, and fragility of the trabecular bone.

His group is involved in providing medical imaging AI solutions as part of cancer management. They are working on image repositories, data harmonization, radiomics, deep features, interoperability, digital twins, in silico emulated trials, open source approaches and image preparation.

== European Projects ==
=== Coordinator of European Projects ===
Acronym	Title	Principal Investigator (IP)	Programme	Funding Entity	Grant agreement ID	Project Award Date	Project End Date
CHAIMELEON	Accelerating the lab to market transition of AI tools for cancer management	Luis Martí-Bonmatí	HORIZONTE 2020 (H2020)	European Commission	952172	01/09/2020	31/02/2024
EUCAIM	European Federation for Cancer Images	Luis Martí-Bonmatí	Europa Digital (DIGITAL)	European Commission	101100633	01/01/2023	31/12/2026

=== Partner of European Projects ===
Acronym	Title	Principal Investigator (IP)	Programme	Funding Entity	Grant agreement ID	Project Award Date	Project End Date
PerproGlio	Integrative Personal Omics Profiles in Glioblastoma Recurrence and Therapy Resistance	Luis Martí-Bonmatí	JOINT TRANSNATIONAL CALL FOR PROPOSALS	European Commission / ISCIII	ERAPERMED2018-270	01/07/2019	30/06/2022
ProCancer-I	An AI Platform integrating imaging data and models, supporting precision care through prostate cancer’s continuum	Luis Martí-Bonmatí	HORIZONTE 2020 (H2020)	European Commission	952159	01/10/2020	30/09/2024
RADIOVAL	International Clinical Validation of Radiomics Artificial Intelligence for Breast Cancer Treatment Planning	Luis Martí-Bonmatí	HORIZON EUROPE	European Commission	101057699	01/09/2022	31/08/2026
CanSERV	Providing cutting edge cancer research services across Europe	Luis Martí-Bonmatí	HORIZON EUROPE	European Commission	101058620	01/09/2022	31/08/2025
IDERHA	Integration of heterogeneous Data and Evidence towards Regulatory and HTA Acceptance	Bernardo Valdivieso Martínez	HORIZON EUROPE	European Commission	101112135	01/04/2023	31/03/2028
NextMRI	Truly portable MRI for extremity and brain imaging anywhere & everywhere	Luis Martí-Bonmatí	HORIZON EUROPE	European Commission	101136407	01/10/2023	30/09/2026
LEOPARD	Liver Electronic Offering Platform with Artificial intelligence-based Devices	Luis Martí-Bonmatí	HORIZON EUROPE	European Commission	101080964-2	2023	2027
PREDICTOM	Prediction of alzheimer´s disease using an AI driven screening platform	Miguel Baquero Toledo	HORIZON EUROPE	European Commission	101132356	2023	2028

== Books ==
Martí-Bonmatí has also published several books.

- Imaging Biomarkers: Development and Clinical Integration. (2016) ISBN 978-3-319-43502-2
- Introduction to the stepwise development of imaging biomarkers. Imaging Biomarkers. Development and clinical integration
- The Final step: imaging biomarkers in structured reports. Imaging Biomarkers. Development and clinical integration.
- Imaging biomarkers in diffuse liver disease. Quantification of fat and iron. Imaging Biomarkers. Development and clinical integration.
- Research in a Radiology Service. Radiology research
- Multiparametric Imaging. Functional Imaging in Oncology
- Brain Connections – resting state fMRI functional connectivity. Novel Frontiers of advanced neuroimaging
- Era of AI Quantitative Imaging
- Imaging Biomarkers in Oncology

== Honors ==
- Fellow of the European Society of Magnetic Resonance in Medicine and Biology (ESMRMB, 2010).
- Fellow of the International Cancer Imaging Society (ICIS, 2011).
- Gold Medal in 2014 from the Spanish Society of Radiology (SERAM, 2008–2010).
- Honorary Fellow of the Asian Society of Abdominal Radiology (ASAR, 2015).
- Doctor Honoris Causa from the Tucuman National University (2015).
- Honorary Member of the Portuguese Society of Radiology and Nuclear Medicine (SPRMN, 2016).
- Gold Medal in 2018 from the European Society of Gastrointestinal and Abdominal Radiology (ESGAR).
- Honorary Fellow of the European Society of Medical Imaging Informatics (EOSOMII, 2019).
- Doctor Honoris Causa from the University of Coimbra (2019).
- Honorary Fellow of the American College of Radiology (2020).
- Medical Doctor of the Year in Precision Medicine (2020).
- Vice-President of the Federation of European Academies of Medicine (2021).
- Most Effective Radiology Educator EuroMinnies awards (2021).
- International Honorary Member of the Mexican Federation of Radiology (FMRI, 2022)
- Gold Medal of the European Society of Radiology (ESR, 2022).
- Research award from the Spanish Society of Radiology (SERAM, 2022).
- Académico Correspondiente de la Real Academia de Medicina de Zaragoza
