= Instituto de Física Corpuscular =

Spanish research institute

Coordinates: 39°30′54″N 0°25′30″W

The Instituto de Física Corpuscular (IFIC, English: Institute for Corpuscular Physics) is a CSIC and University of Valencia joint center dedicated to experimental and theoretical research in the fields of particle physics, nuclear physics, cosmology, astroparticles and medical physics.

It is located at the scientific park of the University of Valencia in Paterna (Valencia, Spain).

== History ==
In the autumn of 1950 Prof. Joaquin Catalá formed a group in Valencia to study atomic nuclei and elementary particles using nuclear emulsions. He had first been working in Bristol with C.F. Powell, who received the Nobel Prize in Physics in 1950 for using this technique to detect particles in cosmic rays.

Prof. Catalá’s group first operated as a Local Division of the Instituto de Óptica Daza de Valdés belonging to CSIC and specialized in photo-nuclear studies. One of Catalá’s students, Fernando Senent, later becoming Professor and director of the Institute, produced what was the first Spanish thesis in Experimental Particle and Nuclear Physics. It was at the beginning of 1960 when the Institute got its present name, IFIC, Instituto de Física Corpuscular. IFIC, hence, is one of the oldest Spanish Institutes in Experimental Physics and the oldest studying particle and nuclear physics.
