= Fuertes =

Fuertes is a surname. Notable people with the surname include:

- Antonio Fuertes (1929–2015), Spanish footballer
- Edder Fuertes (born 1992), Ecuadorian footballer
- Eduardo Fuertes (born 1943), Filipino footballer
- Esteban Fuertes (born 1972), Argentine football striker
- Estevan Antonio Fuertes (1838–1903), Puerto Rican-American astronomer and civil engineer
- Gloria Fuertes (1917–1998), Spanish poet and author of children's literature
- Gustavo Fuertes (born 1959), Spanish screenwriter and director
- James Hillhouse Fuertes (1863–1932), US American civil and sanitary engineer, son of Estevan Antonio Fuertes and brother of Louis Agassiz Fuertes
- Jesus Fuertes (1938–2006), Spanish Cubist painter
- José María Mohedano Fuertes (born 1948), Spanish lawyer and politician
- José Ramón Fuertes (born 1943), Spanish footballer and manager
- Juan Jose Fuertes Martinez (born 1976), Spanish swimmer
- Laura Fuertes (born 1999), Spanish boxer
- Louis Agassiz Fuertes (1874–1927), US American ornithologist, illustrator and artist, son of Estevan Antonio Fuertes and brother of James Hillhouse Fuertes
- Maria Fuertes, 2020 American murder victim
- Mercedes Fuertes (born 1955), Spanish handball player
- Miguel Fuertes (born 1951), Spanish diplomat
- Pilar Fuertes Ferragut (1962–2012), Spanish diplomat
- Xavier Pascual Fuertes (born 1968), Spanish former handball player and current coach

See also

- Fuertes Observatory, is an astronomical observatory located on the North Campus of Cornell University in Ithaca, New York
