= Sophronia =

Sophronia may refer to:

== People ==
- Sophronia (given name)
- Sophronia Bucklin (1828–1902), American Civil War nurse
- Sophronia Woodruff Dews, co-founder of Alpha Delta Pi sorority
- Sophronia Farrington Naylor Grubb (1834–1902), American activist
- Sophronia Smith (1803–1876), member of the Smith family (Latter Day Saints)
- Sophronia Wilson Wagoner (1834–1929), pioneer missionary and leader in social work

=== Fictional characters ===
- Sofronia/Sophronia, character in Torquato Tasso's 16th century epic poem Jerusalem Delivered
- Sophronia Lammle (née Akershem), character in Charles Dickens's 1865 novel Our Mutual Friend

== Other uses ==
- Cattleya syn. Sophronia, a genus of orchid
- Sophronia (moth), a genus of moth
- USS Sophronia (1861)

== See also ==
- Sofronia
- Sophronius (disambiguation)
- Sophronica
- Sofron
- Sofronie
- Sofronije
