= Sophronia (given name) =

Female given name

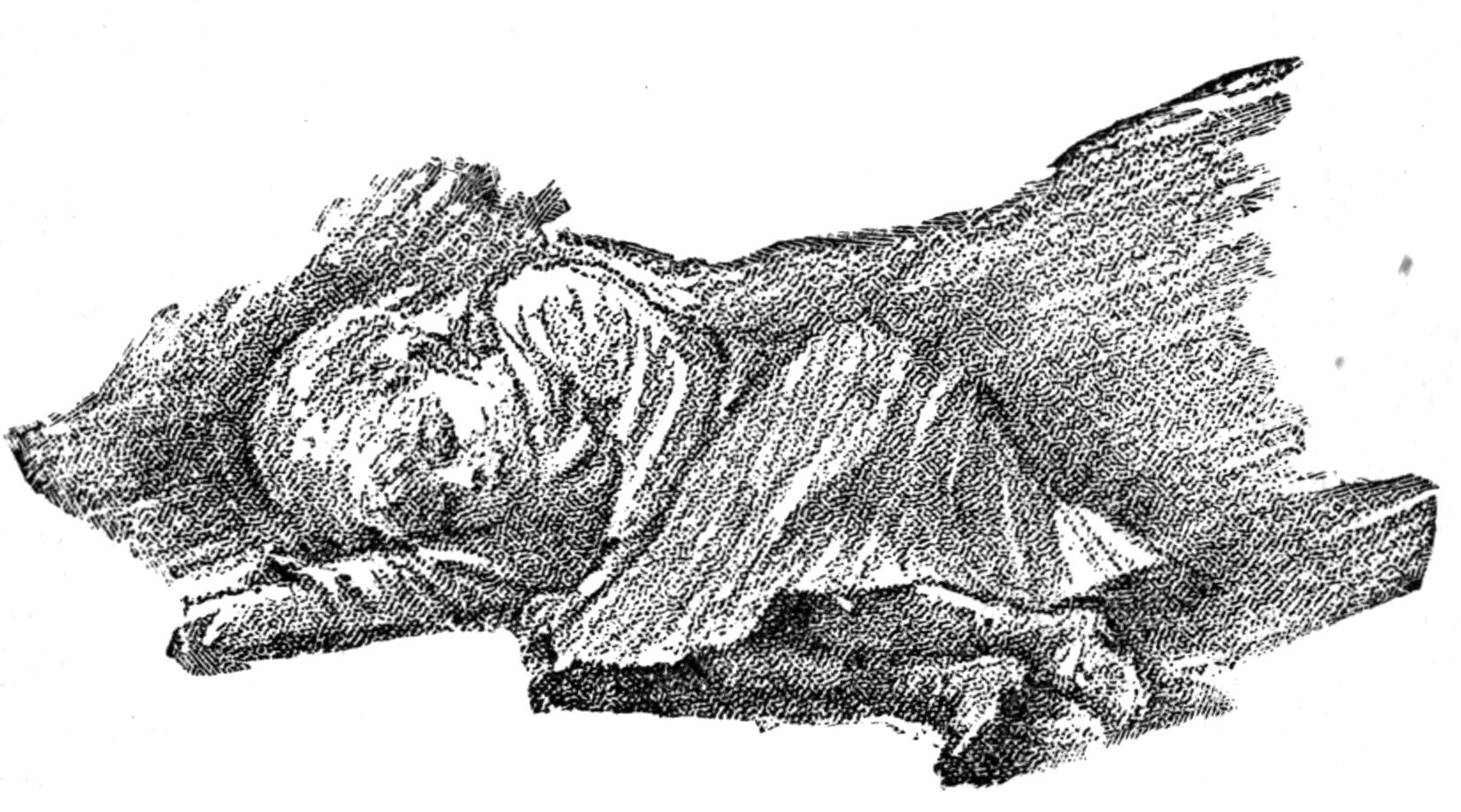
- Phronsie thinks she wants to go to bed, an illustration from Five Little Peppers and How They Grew (1909) by Margaret Sidney. Sophronia “Phronsie” Pepper is a character in the children’s book series.
- Gender: Feminine
- Language: Greek, Latin

Origin
- Meaning: Self-controlled

Sophronia is a feminine given name. It is the feminine version of the Latin name Sophronius, which was ultimately derived from the Greek word sophron, meaning “self controlled.” The name was in regular use in the United States in the 19th century and the name remains in occasional use throughout the Anglosphere. Variants of the name include Safrona, Safronia, Saphronia, Soffrona, Sofronia, Sophrina, Sophrona, Sophronie, Sophrony, and Zephronia. Nicknames include Frona, Fronia, Fronie, Phrona, Phronia, Phronie, and Phronsie. Variants of Sophia including Sophie and Sophy have also been used as diminutives of Sophronia.

== Women named Sophronia ==
- Sophronia Adams (1840–1910), American author and clubwoman
- Sophronia Bucklin (1828–1902), American Civil War nurse
- Sophronia Woodruff Dews (1835-1913), American co-founder of Alpha Delta Pi sorority
- Sophronia Maria Elliott (1854–1942), American home economist
- Sophronia Farrington Naylor Grubb (1834–1902), American activist
- Sophronia Smith (1803–1876), member of the Smith family (Latter Day Saints)
- Sophronia Smith Hunt (née Allen; 1846—1928), American woman who disguised herself as a man and secretly served as a soldier in the Union Army during the American Civil War
- Sophronia Wilson Wagoner (1834 – 1929), American missionary and social worker

== Women named Safrona ==
- Safrona Beard Ables, American rape and murder victim in 1879 Alabama

=== Fictional characters ===
- Sofronia/Sophronia, character in Torquato Tasso's 16th century epic poem Jerusalem Delivered
- Sophronia Lammle (née Akershem), character in Charles Dickens's 1865 novel Our Mutual Friend
- Sophronia “Phronsie” Pepper in the Five Little Peppers book series by Harriett Lothrop
