= Collinwood school fire =

Deadly 1908 fire in Collinwood, Ohio, US

Collinwood School Fire
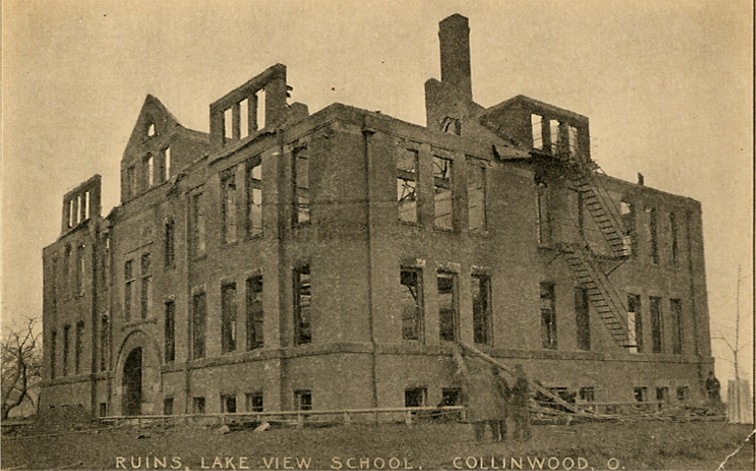
- The school after the fire
- Location of Lake View School
- Date: March 4, 1908
- Venue: Lake View School
- Location: Collinwood, Ohio, US; 41°34′17″N 81°34′32″W
- Type: Fire
- Deaths: 175
- Injuries: 0

The Collinwood school fire (also known as the Lake View School fire) was a major disaster that occurred at the Lake View School in Collinwood, Ohio, when a fire erupted on March 4, 1908, killing 172 students, two teachers and one rescuer. It is one of the deadliest school disasters in United States history.

== Fire ==
Lake View School, Collinwood, Ohio as it appeared before March 4, 1908

The Lake View School, as with many similarly designed buildings around the country, was vulnerable to fire. During the fire, the school's masonry exterior acted as a chimney, sucking flame upward as the wooden interior burned, and open stairways and the absence of fire breaks enhanced the chimney effect. The building had only two exits, and fire quickly blocked the front door. Children rushed to the rear door, but in a vestibule narrowed by partitions, they stumbled and climbed on top of one another, forming a pile that completely blocked the exit. Although later accounts sometimes described children pinned against inward-swinging doors, Lake View's doors opened outward.

However, the vestibule created an impassable bottleneck for the crowd trying to rush through it. Collinwood's small volunteer fire department and horse-drawn engines arrived too late and were ill-equipped to battle the fire. In less than an hour, the three floors and the roof of the Lake View School collapsed into the basement, leaving only a hollowed-out brick ruin. Almost half of the children and two teachers in the building died.

=== Cause ===
The origin of the fire remains uncertain, although numerous explanations proliferated. Newspapers circulated many possibilities, sometimes blaming the building's janitor Fritz Hirter for inattentiveness and for running the boiler too hot. Another theory held that the fire was caused by girls smoking in a basement closet near flammable materials. A quickly completed coroner's inquest concluded that heating pipes running next to exposed wooden joists ignited the building. The coroner blamed the fire on "conditions" and held no one legally accountable for it. Many parents condemned the speed of the inquest and objected to its refusal to hold the school board, the architects, Hirter or anyone else responsible. J.H. Morgan, Ohio's chief inspector of public buildings, explained the problem in his annual report to the governor and citizens: "The cause of the fire cannot be determined. Many believe it originated from the heating system or boilers, but proof has been offered to the contrary."

A memorial plaque placed at the site by the state of Ohio in 2003 asserts that the fire was of "unknown origin."

== Aftermath ==
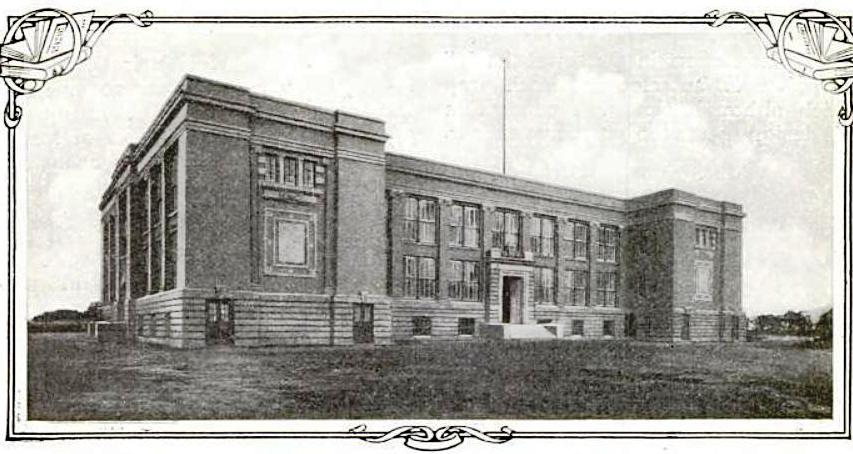
The fire-safe building erected after the deadly fire, 1911

The town of Collinwood paid for the burial of 19 unidentifiable bodies in a shared grave at Cleveland's Lake View Cemetery. After crews demolished the ruins of the school, disputes about the use of the land quickly arose. In the interests of efficiency and economy, the school board had initially planned to build a new school on the site of the tragedy, but mourning parents objected, and some also filed lawsuits seeking to prevent construction.

After more than a year of dispute, the state purchased the land where the Lake View School had stood, and the town converted it into a memorial garden, designed by Louise Klein Miller. The new Collinwood Memorial School, built to the highest standards of fire resistance at the time, was constructed on an adjacent lot. Mrs. Ella Smith (née Hirter) was the last living survivor when she died in 2001, at the age of 99. Her father, Fritz Hirter, was the school's janitor at the time when she attended school with four older siblings, Walter (fourteen), Helena (thirteen), Warner (twelve), and Ida (eight). At age six, Ella, her father and brother, Warner, escaped. By coincidence, she was married in 1928 to Otto Smith, who lost his eldest brother, Willie, in the same school fire.

== See also ==
- List of historic fires
