= Sofronie =

Sofronie may refer to:

== Name ==
- Sofronie of Cioara, Romanian Orthodox saint
- Sofronie Drincec (born 1967), Romanian bishop
- Sofronie Vârnav, Moldavian and Romanian political figure, philanthropist, collector, and Orthodox clergyman
- Sofronie Vulpescu (1856 – 1923), Romanian cleric

== Surname ==
- Nicoleta Daniela Șofronie (born 1988), Romanian artistic gymnast

== See also ==
- Sofron
- Sofronije
- Sophronia (disambiguation)
- Sophronius (disambiguation)
