= National Plant, Flower and Fruit Guild =

The National Plant, Flower and Fruit Guild was a charity in the United States, started by 1895. It may have been associated with the Women's club movement.

Its original goals were "to collect flowers, fruits and vegetables, and to distribute them to the needy, to place window boxes in unfortunate sections of one's community; and to start the children and grown people with an interest in the soil."

Adeline Palmier Wagoner (1868 – 1929) was president of the St. Louis, Missouri branch. Louise Klein Miller was a national vice-president of the guild.

It had a magazine, the National Plant, Flower and Fruit Guild Magazine, which was published in New York City and in 1917 cost 25 cents a year for its four quarterly issues.

In West Chicago, a garden club for many years collected flowers from gardens and "distributed bouquets to the poor and the ill", in conjunction with the Chicago Plant Flower and Fruit Guild.
