= Sofron =

Sofron may refer to:

- Sofron Mudry, Ukrainian Bishop of the Ukrainian Catholic Church
- Sofron Dmyterko, Ukrainian Bishop of the Ukrainian Greek Catholic Church
- István Sofron, Hungarian professional ice hockey player
- Sophron, ancient Greek writer

== See also ==
- Sofronije
- Sofronie
- Sofronia
- Sophronia (disambiguation)
- Sophronius (disambiguation)
