= Sophronius =

Sophronius is the given name of:

- Sophronius (theologian), late 4th century writer and companion of Saint Jerome
- Saint Sophronios I of Cyprus, 6th century archbishop of Cyprus
- Saint Sophronius I of Jerusalem (560–638), Patriarch of Jerusalem
- Patriarch Sophronius I of Alexandria, patriarch 841–860
- Patriarch Sophronius II of Alexandria, patriarch 941
- Patriarch Sophronius II of Jerusalem, 11th-century patriarch of Jerusalem
- Patriarch Sophronius III of Alexandria, patriarch 1137–1171
- Archbishop Sophronios II of Cyprus, archbishop of Cyprus 1191
- Patriarch Sophronius III of Jerusalem, 13th century patriarch of Jerusalem
- Patriarch Sophronius I of Constantinople, patriarch 1463–1464
- Patriarch Sophronius IV of Jerusalem, patriarch of Jerusalem 1579–1608
- Sophronios Leichoudes (1653–1730), Greek monk, one of the Likhud Brothers
- Saint Sophronius, Bishop of Irkutsk (1704–1771), feast day March 30
- Patriarch Sophronius II of Constantinople (died 1780), also known as Patriarch Sophronius V of Jerusalem
- Saint Sophronius of Vratsa (1739–1813), Bulgarian cleric and one of the leading figures of the early Bulgarian National Revival
- Metropolitan Sophronios I of Crete, metropolitan of Crete 1850
- Metropolitan Sophronios II of Crete, metropolitan of Crete 1874–1877
- Patriarch Sophronius III of Constantinople (1802–1899), also known as Patriarch Sophronius IV of Alexandria
- Archbishop Sophronios III of Cyprus, archbishop of Cyprus 1865–1900
- Sophronius S. Landt (1842–1926), American politician
- Bishop Sophronios Beshara of Los Angeles (1888–1940), American Orthodox Catholic Church

== See also ==
- Sophronia (disambiguation)
- Sophronica
- Sofron
- Sofronie
- Sofronije
