= Adeline Palmier Wagoner =

American organizational leader and author

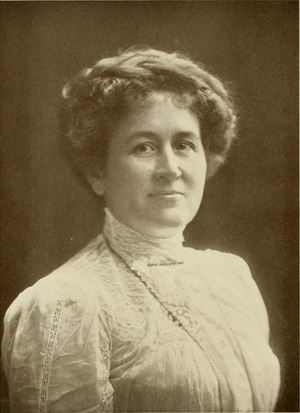
- from Notable Women of St. Louis, 1914
- Born: Adeline Palmier Myers; February 14, 1868; St. Louis, Missouri
- Died: April 21, 1929 (aged 61)
- Known for: President of the St. Louis branch of the National Plant, Flower and Fruit Guild
- Spouse: Harry Epply Wagoner

Adeline Palmier Wagoner (February 14, 1868 – April 21, 1929) was an American volunteer organizational leader and author. She served as president of the St. Louis, Missouri, branch of the National Plant, Flower and Fruit Guild, a charity for the poor and afflicted, and as president of the Shakespeare Tercentenary Society.

== Early life ==
Adeline Palmier Myers was born on February 1, 1868, in St. Louis, Missouri. She was the daughter of Frederick Myers and Louisa Palmier (b. 1837). Myers's mother wrote the words for Let Us Sing of Old Missouri, music by Johanna Mohr, arranged by Esther M. Harkins.

Myers had one sister who married Walter Dray, of Chicago. Wagoner's mother was the daughter of Michel Beaulier Palmier (1800–1851), granddaughter of Jean Beaulieu (dit Palmier), a captain of the War of 1812, and great-granddaughter of Michel Joseph Beaulieu, captain of the first regularly organized militia of Illinois, and Angelique Chauvin, daughter of a French officer of Fort de Chartres, Illinois.

Myers graduated from the Central High School and the Normal High School. She was elected class historian, representative, and wrote and delivered the class poem. As a young girl, she was a prominent member of the McCullagh Dramatic Club, of which Gen. William Tecumseh Sherman was president, and Wayman C. McCreery, secretary. Myers played the principal parts with Augustus Thomas, William Beaumont Smith, Guy Lindsley, and others who later became professionals in the theater world. She took the leading part in one of Thomas' first plays, The Cattle King. She also assisted in raising money for the Young Women's Christian Association, as well as taking part in carnivals given for the benefit of hospitals, asylums, etc.

== Career ==
Adeline Wagoner was the vice-president and recording secretary of the Chapter 0 of the P.E.O. Sisterhood, founded on January 21, 1869, as a seven-member sorority at Iowa Wesleyan College in Mount Pleasant, Iowa. It was the second sorority to be founded in the U.S.

In St. Louis, Wagoner was the president of The National Plant, Flower and Fruit Guild, whose motto was "When we can and what we can". The members of the guild headed by Wagoner asked for donation of fruit, flowers, magazines, delicacies for the table, clothing, etc. These articles were then distributed regularly, and particularly on anniversaries and holidays.

In 1913 the guild distributed 21,000 bunches of flowers, 36 bushels of fruit, 16 gallons of strawberries, 500 glasses of jelly, hundreds of magazines, 200 potted plants, and different articles of clothing, such as shawls, stockings, and handkerchiefs, Christmas boxes and bags by the hundreds, and a great quantity of tobacco. In the summer of 1913 they distributed seeds to children to plant back-yard gardens, open-lot gardens, and window boxes. Eight prizes were awarded to the best arranged window boxes.

Florence Putnam was in charge of the Flowers department. Some of the other women who were most active in assisting Wagoner, and who hold the important offices in the local organization, were Mrs. Frederick Kreismann, Mrs. James McCourtney, Mrs. H.H. Wagoner (Sophronia Wilson Wagoner), Mrs. H.H. Evans, Mrs. U.L. Clark, Mrs. William Huppert, Mrs. Relle Forse, Mrs. Hugh Romanoski, Mrs. A.A. Flanders, Mrs. E.J. Kramer and Mrs. J. Rossman.

The Guild did also volunteering work at the Poor House, later City Infirmary or St. Mary's Infirmary (currently a NRHP place in Downtown St. Louis): they brought tobacco, pencils, pads of paper, shoe strings, knives, etc., for the men; in the woman's department they put potted plants by each bed, and a little basket of sewing materials with a box of cake, candy and fruit, also quilt pieces and little ornaments for the hair and dress; for the consumptive ward, where the most critical patients were kept, they brought sunshine and angel cakes; vegetable plants for the gardens were donated by the City Workhouse gardens.

Wagoner was the president of the Shakespeare Tercentenary Society, based at the Planters Hotel. The honorary president was Dr. Denton J. Snider, a Shakespeare scholar. Originally a study club, dedicated to a consideration of Snider's Hegelian interpretation of Shakespeare, it became, after Wagoner took over the management, more and more social in orientation. In 1916 Wagoner curated the exhibition Shakespeare Tercentenary Celebration at the Scruggs-Vandervoort-Barney auditorium, St. Louis, of which she also curated the catalogue: curious, instructive and beautiful objects pertaining to Shakespeare and the stage. She was also vice-president of the National Shakespeare Federation.

On December 6, 1917, World News published Little Orphant Annie's Tale of the War by Wagoner, dedicated to the National Council of Defense.

During World War I, Wagoner took part in the Liberty bond campaign and volunteered for the Red Cross. In 1916 Wagoner received a letter from Elisabeth Bass, secretary of the National Woman's Liberty Loan Committee, extending congratulations and thanks for her efforts.

On August 10, 1921, Wagoner chaired the celebration commemorating Missouri's admission to the Union and was secretary of the Lafayette Celebration Committee.

In 1921 Wagoner contributed the essay A man for all ages for the commemorative meeting of the early Saint Louis movement in philosophy, psychology, literature, art and education, in honor of Dr. Denton J. Snider's 80th birthday, held on January 14 and 15, 1921, at the Vandervoort's Music Hall, St. Louis.

== Personal life ==
In 1890 Adeline Myers married Harry Epply Wagoner, insurance broker and president of the Wagoner Mercantile Company, a mail order house, son of Henry Hoover Wagoner (1824–1906) and Sophronia L. Wilson. They had one son, Stanley Blewett (September 9, 1891 – April 16, 1949, buried at Bellefontaine Cemetery), a graduate of Yale College (B.A. 1913), where he had been most prominent during the four years, having won many gold medals in all Eastern college meets. She died on April 21, 1929. After her death, Harry Wagoner remarried with Caroline U. Hoffman, a housekeeper of the American Hotel.

Wagoner won several prizes as a golf player at Glen Echo Country Club and Algonquin Golf Club. She was also a swimmer, diver, and equestrienne.

== Family ==
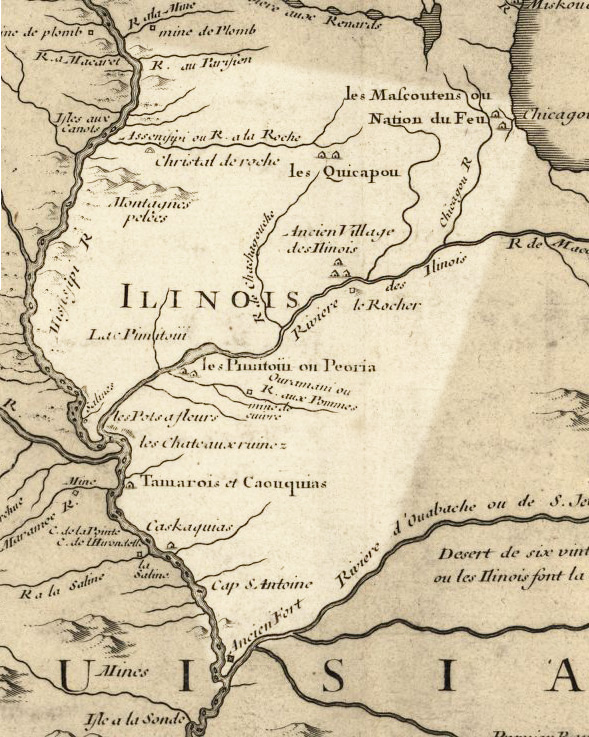
Tamarois et Caouquias appears on a map of Illinois in 1718 south of the confluence of the Illinois and Mississippi rivers (approximate modern state area highlighted) from Carte de la Louisiane et du Cours du Mississipi by Guillaume de L'Isle.

Angelique Chauvin Beaulieu was born in 1742, educated at Quebec, and in 1760 married Michel Beaulieu, making her home in Cahokia, a French-controlled town in Illinois Country, where she became a social leader on account of her superior education and accomplishments. Illinois Governor Reynolds said of her, "She was the director-general in moral and medical matters; the peacemaker of the village, whose society was sought by old and young for their improvement." In 1914, Wagoner wrote Madame Beaulieu: A Colonial Dame.
