= Lake View Cemetery (Ithaca, New York) =

Historic cemetery in Tompkins County, New York

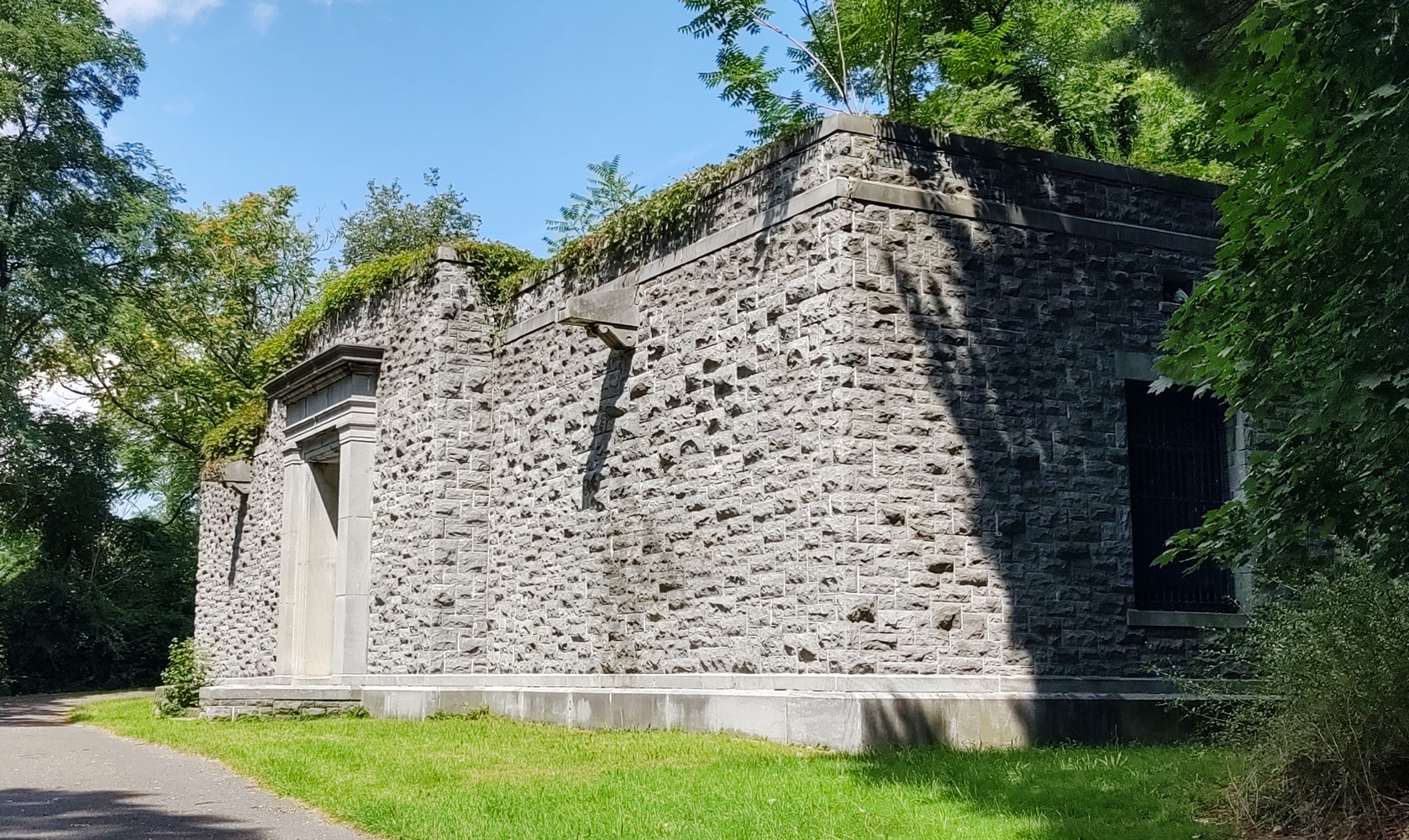
- Egyptian Revival Mausoleum
- Interactive map of Lake View Cemetery

Details
- Established: 1894
- Location: 605 E Shore Dr, Ithaca, New York
- Country: United States
- Coordinates: 42°27′25″N 76°29′42″W
- No. of graves: 8,000
- Website: lakeview-ithaca.org
- Find a Grave: Lake View Cemetery

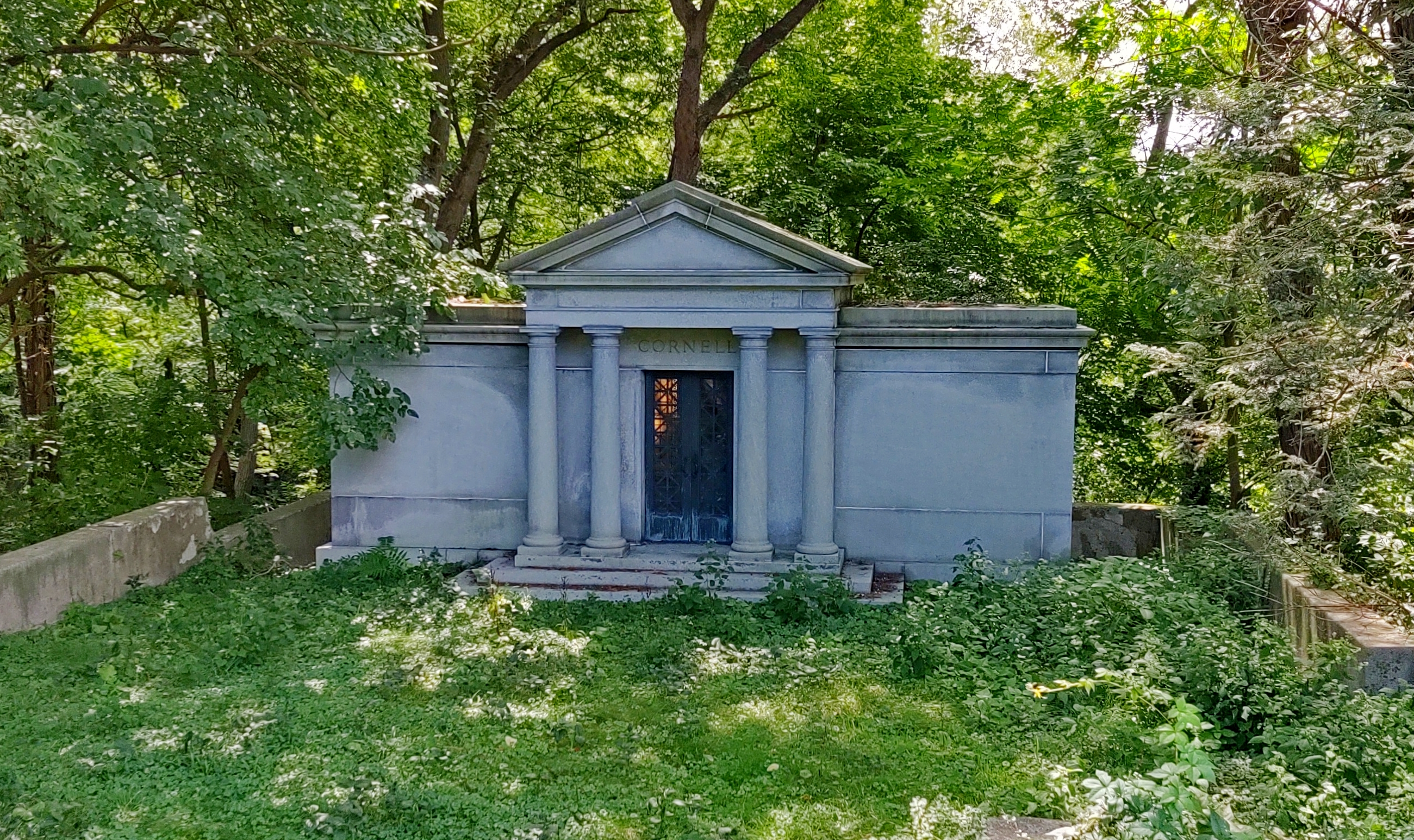
The Cornell Family mausoleum, designed by William Henry Miller

Lake View Cemetery is a historic cemetery in the city of Ithaca, in Tompkins County, New York named for its original view of nearby Lake Cayuga.

== History ==
The cemetery was established in 1894. It includes an Egyptian Revival style mausoleum and receiving vault, a distinctive serpentine road system and architectural works by William Henry Miller and Liberty Hyde Bailey.

Lake View Cemetery was hit with a series of embezzlement scandals in the twenty-first century. In 2006, a groundskeeper pled guilty to stealing $87,709 from the cemetery. In 2014, a former caretaker and president of Lake View Cemetery was charged with embezzling over $50,000 and "selling or giving away" much of the cemetery's equipment. The cemetery is currently in operation, selling burial lots and providing burial services.

== Notable burials ==
Given its proximity to Cornell University, the cemetery includes a number of significant figures from the university's history, including members of the Cornell family, and the graves of faculty members.

- Liberty Hyde Bailey (1858–1954), American horticulturalist and designer
- Ethel Zoe Bailey (1889–1983), American botanist and curator
- Juanita Breckenridge Bates (1860–1946), American suffragist and early woman ordained as a minister
- Sophronia Bucklin (1828–1902), American Civil War nurse
- John "Honest John" Clapp (1851–1904), early American baseball player and manager
- Robert Gilmour Dobie (1878–1948), American football player and record-setting coach
- Estevan Antonio Fuertes (1838–1903), Cornell astronomer and namesake of Fuertes Observatory
- Louis Agassiz Fuertes (1874–1927), American ornithologist, illustrator and artist
- James R. Houck (1940–2015), pioneer of infrared observational astronomy
- William Henry Miller (1848–1922), American architect
- Chester Platt (1857–1934), inventor and publisher
- Carl Sagan (1934–1996), American astronomer, cosmologist, astrophysicist, astrobiologist, author, science popularizer
- Trevor Pinch (1952-2021), British sociologist and an originator of the theory of Social Construction of Technology.
