= Lynching of Albert Easley =

- Location: Jacksonville, Alabama, U.S.
- Date: January 20, 1879
- Attack type: Lynching
- Victim: Albert Easley

Albert Easley was an African-American boy aged 13–14 years who was lynched in Jacksonville, Calhoun County, Alabama, on January 20, 1879, after being arrested as a suspect in the assault and rape of Mrs. Moses Ables of nearby Cove Creek, Etowah County, Alabama. Mrs. Ables, a widowed mother of three, was found unconscious but alive three days earlier with severe head injuries and indications that she had been raped. No eyewitnesses were reported and it is not clear why suspicion rested immediately upon Easley. Accounts emphasize that he confessed, but one account claims he admitted only the beating and denied the rape. He was arrested and taken to the jail in Jacksonville about 14 mi (23 km) from where the crime occurred. At 1 pm a mob of between one hundred and fifty and three hundred persons took Easley from the jail by force and lynched him within the city limits during the daytime. Mrs. Ables died five weeks after the lynching took place.

== Crime ==
Newspaper reports suggest that the crime was committed on Thursday, January 16, just 4 days before the lynching. Mrs. Moses Ables was reportedly found the following day unconscious, suffering from multiple skull fractures and apparently raped. She was presumed to be near death though she survived several weeks following the assault and subsequent lynching.

In the press the victim is represented only as Mrs. Ables, Mrs. Moses Ables, or the daughter of James Beard. From the 1860 and 1870 federal censuses it appears that her given name may have been Sophrony or Safrona.

== Confession ==
The same day that Mrs. Ables was discovered Albert Easley was arrested and taken to jail in Jacksonville in neighboring Calhoun County. According to the Gadsden Times, Easley "confessed to his heinous offense before he was carried to jail, and carried parties to the place where he committed the deed and described the manner in which he did it."

Professor W. J. Borden of Calhoun College in Jacksonville witnessed the subsequent lynching and offered a full account of events in a letter to Mr. Howell of the Alabama State Senate. Regarding the confession he recounts, "This negro was taken up on suspicion at once, acknowledged the attempt to kill her, but denied the rape and gave as his excuse for attempting to kill, that he threw a rock at something else which accidentally struck the woman, and then concluded to kill her to keep her from telling on him".

A Talladega newspaper stated that "Suspicion fixed the inhuman crime on a negro boy 13 years of age". None of the accounts reveal why Albert Easley was immediately suspected. But his alleged confession was emphasized by the press. The Jacksonville Republican reported that it left little room for doubt as to his guilt. The Montgomery Advertiser took it one step further stating that his confession to the crime left "no doubt" that he committed it.

Other newspapers were quick to pronounce Albert Easley guilty labeling him "the incarnate devil" and "diabolical wretch".

== Lynching ==
On Monday, January 20 a mob assembled of between one hundred and fifty and three hundred men from Cove Creek. It was said to be made up of white and negro citizens who were indignant over the brutal treatment of one from their community. Professor Borden characterized them as "the best citizens of the county". The local grocery had reportedly been closed and citizens were instructed to abstain from drinking alcohol as they prepared to take the law into their own hands.

Referring to the mob the local newspaper wrote:

They are the conservators of the peace and order of their county. If in their judgement this was necessary to preserve the same, then it is right. Rape cannot be excused under any circumstances. Death is the only punishment adequate, and the delays of the law cannot be tolerated by an outraged community under such circumstances.

— "Hanging of the negro, Albert Easley, by the citizens of Calhoun County", Gadsden Times

Armed with guns, pistols, crowbars and sledge hammers, they travelled approximately 14 miles to Jacksonville where Albert Easley was being held.

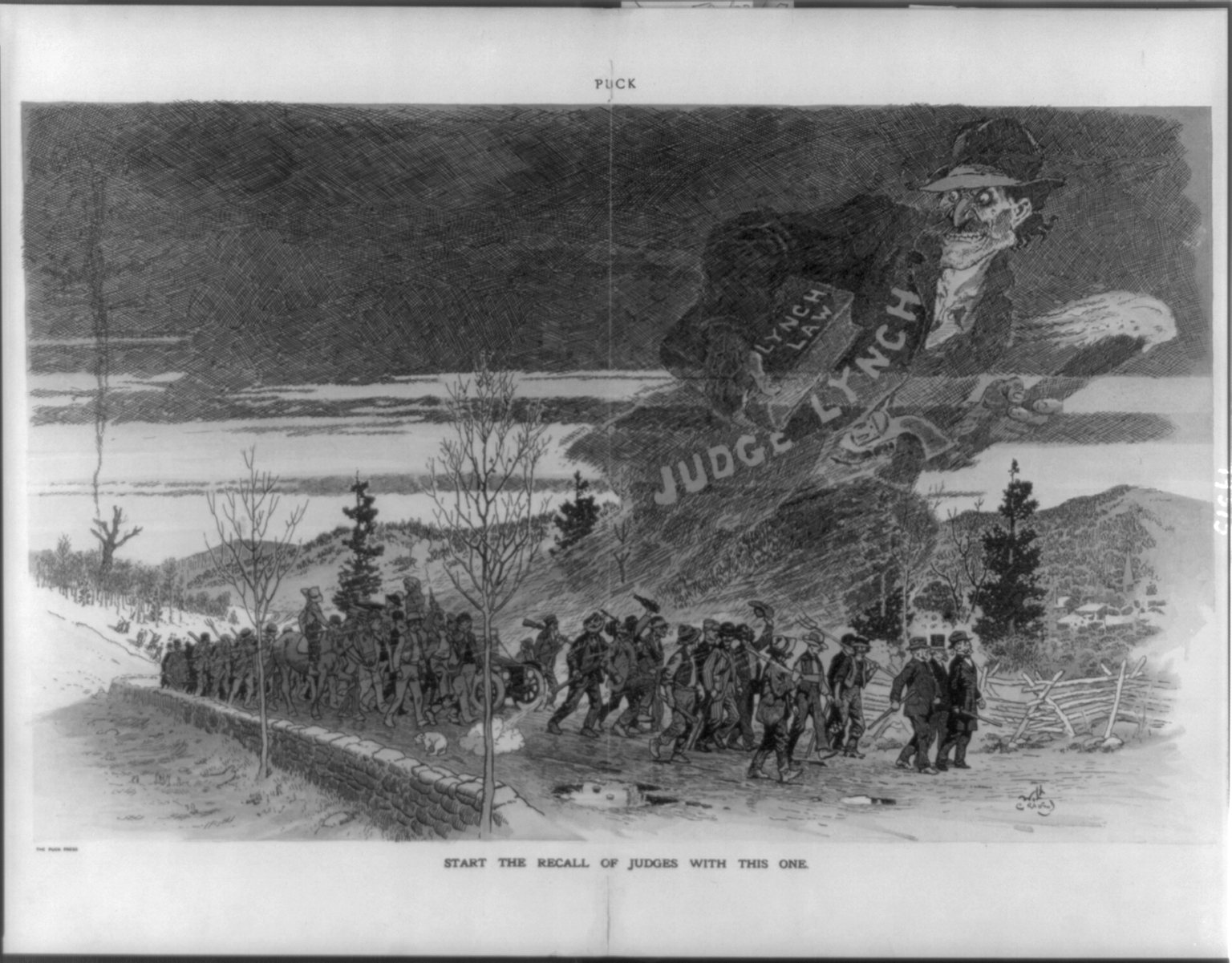

The Montgomery Advertiser reported that Judge Lynch was in Jacksonville.

Our town is to-night laboring under a very great excitement, but a quiet one. To-day about 250 armed men composed of the best citizens of the county came in town about one o'clock, went to the jail, demanded a negro who was incarcerated last Friday, and forced the jailor to deliver to them said negro. They then in the most quiet manner, for so large a crowd, marched from the jail to the hill east of the court house near Dr. Nesbet's and there hung him till he was entirely dead. His body was taken down about 3 o'clock this evening by order of Judge Cannon, and lies in the court house.

— Prof. W. J. Borden, "The Lynching at Jacksonville", Montgomery Advertiser

== See also ==
- False accusations of rape as justification for lynchings
