= Louis Agassiz Fuertes =

United States ornithological artist (1874–1927)

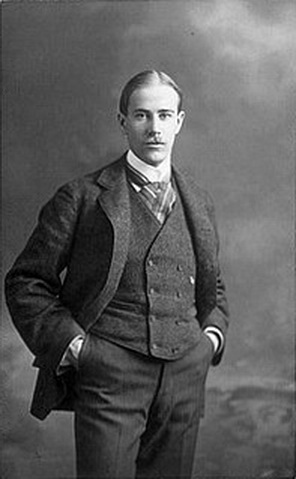
- Born: February 7, 1874; Ithaca, New York, US
- Died: August 22, 1927 (aged 53); Railroad crossing near Unadilla, New York, US
- Education: Cornell University
- Occupations: Ornithologist, illustrator and artist
- Known for: Paintings of birds
- Spouse: Margaret F. Sumner
- Children: 2
- Parents: Estevan Fuertes (father); Mary Stone Perry Fuertes (mother)
- Relatives: Elliott Coues (uncle), James Hillhouse Fuertes (brother)

Louis Agassiz Fuertes (February 7, 1874 – August 22, 1927) was an American ornithologist, illustrator and artist who set the rigorous and current-day standards for ornithological art and naturalist depiction and is considered one of the most prolific American bird artists, second only to his guiding professional predecessor John James Audubon.

== Biography ==
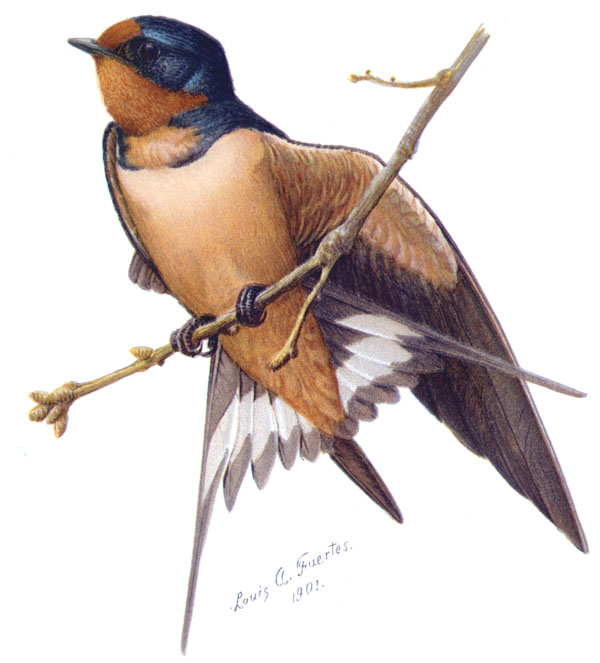
Barn swallow from The Second Book of Birds, 1901

=== Early life ===
Fuertes was born in Ithaca, New York, and was the son of Puerto Rican astronomer and civil engineer Estevan Fuertes and Mary Stone Perry Fuertes. His father was the founding professor of the School of Civil Engineering at Cornell University, and for many years served as the dean of the college. Estevan named his son after the Swiss-born American naturalist Jean Louis Rodolphe Agassiz, who had died the year before. Fuertes's mother, born in Troy, New York, was of Dutch ancestry.

Young Louis became interested in birds at a very early age, killing birds with a slingshot and examining them carefully.

As a child, he had been influenced by John James Audubon's The Birds of America. At the age of fourteen, he made his first painting of a live bird, a male red crossbill. He learned to keep careful records of the appearance, habits and voices of birds.

In 1890, he sent a specimen that he collected to the Smithsonian and received stellar praise and glowing comments on its rarity and accuracy and in 1891, at the age of 17, Louis became the youngest member ever named as an Associate Member of the American Ornithologists' Union.

He was encouraged by his father's colleagues at Cornell including Burt G. Wilder and Liberty H. Bailey.

In June 1892, he accompanied his parents to Europe and sketched birds and animals at the Jardin des Plantes in Paris.

In September, he joined the Institute of Keller, a school in Zurich, staying on for a year.

=== Cornell University ===
Returning to the United States, he enrolled in Cornell in 1893, choosing to study architecture.

His older brother James, however shared in a memoir that Louis lacked a passion for geometry and mathematics and would often fall asleep when James tried to coach him. During one college lecture, Louis climbed out a classroom window and sat completely still in a tree to investigate a strange bird call he had never heard before.

His interest in singing led him to join the Cornell University Glee Club. In 1894, the Glee Club went on a tour to Washington, D.C., where another member of the club suggested that Louis meet his uncle Elliott Coues, who was also keenly interested in birds. This meeting was a turning point, as Coues recognized Fuertes' talent and spread the word about his already distinguished work. In 1895 Coues exhibited fifty of the works of Fuertes at the Congress of the American Ornithologists' Union at Washington, a meeting that Louis was unable to attend. He received the first of his many commissions for illustrating birds while still an undergraduate.

At Cornell, he was elected to the Sphinx Head Society, the oldest senior honor society at the university. He was also a member of Alpha Delta Phi which he joined having been lifelong friends with famed horticulturalist and naturalist Theodore Luqueer Mead, one of his father's former students and member of the fraternity.

In 1896, Coues invited Fuertes to attend the Ornithological Congress at Cambridge in England.

=== Career and personal life ===
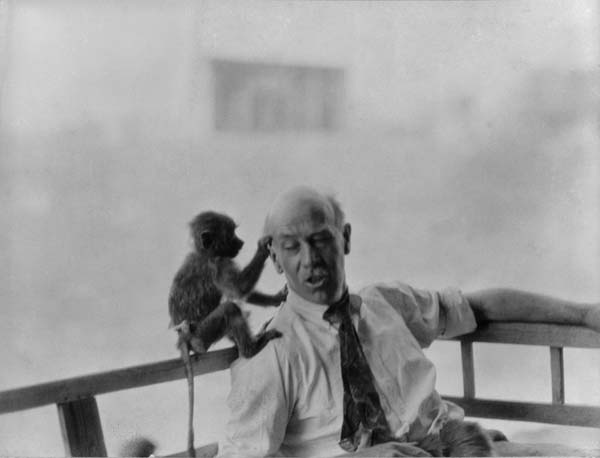
Fuertes and baboon, Abyssinian Expedition (1927)

After graduating from Cornell in 1897 he became an apprentice to the painter Abbott H. Thayer. In 1898, he made his first expedition, with Thayer and his son Gerald, to Florida. In 1899, Fuertes accompanied E. H. Harriman on his famous exploration of the Alaska coastline, the Harriman Alaska Expedition.

Fuertes later traveled across much of the United States and to many countries in pursuit of birds, including the Bahamas, Jamaica, Canada, Mexico, Colombia, and Ethiopia. Fuertes collaborated with Frank Chapman, curator of the American Museum of Natural History, on many assignments including field research, background dioramas at the museum, and book illustrations. While on a collecting expedition with Chapman in Mexico, Fuertes discovered a species of oriole. Chapman named it Icterus fuertesi, commonly called Fuertes's oriole after his friend.

In 1904 Fuertes married Margaret F. Sumner and they had a son, Louis Sumner, and a daughter, Mary.

Fuertes regularly lectured on ornithology at Cornell University beginning in 1923. Fuertes was an able imitator of bird song and even made a trial recording for a Victor record in 1913.

In 1926–27 he participated in the Field Museum's Abyssinian Expedition led by Wilfred Hudson Osgood. He produced some of his most exquisite bird and mammal watercolors as a result of this trip.

=== Death ===
Upon his return from Ethiopia, Fuertes visited Frank Chapman at Tannersville, New York. Returning from the meeting, his car was hit by a train at a railroad crossing near Unadilla, New York, and he was killed. A load of hay had concealed the oncoming train. His wife was seriously injured but survived.

Despite the collision, the paintings he carried all survived undamaged. This collection was later purchased from Mrs. Fuertes by C. Suydam Cutting.

Fuertes is buried at Lake View Cemetery in Ithaca, New York.

== Memorials and legacy ==
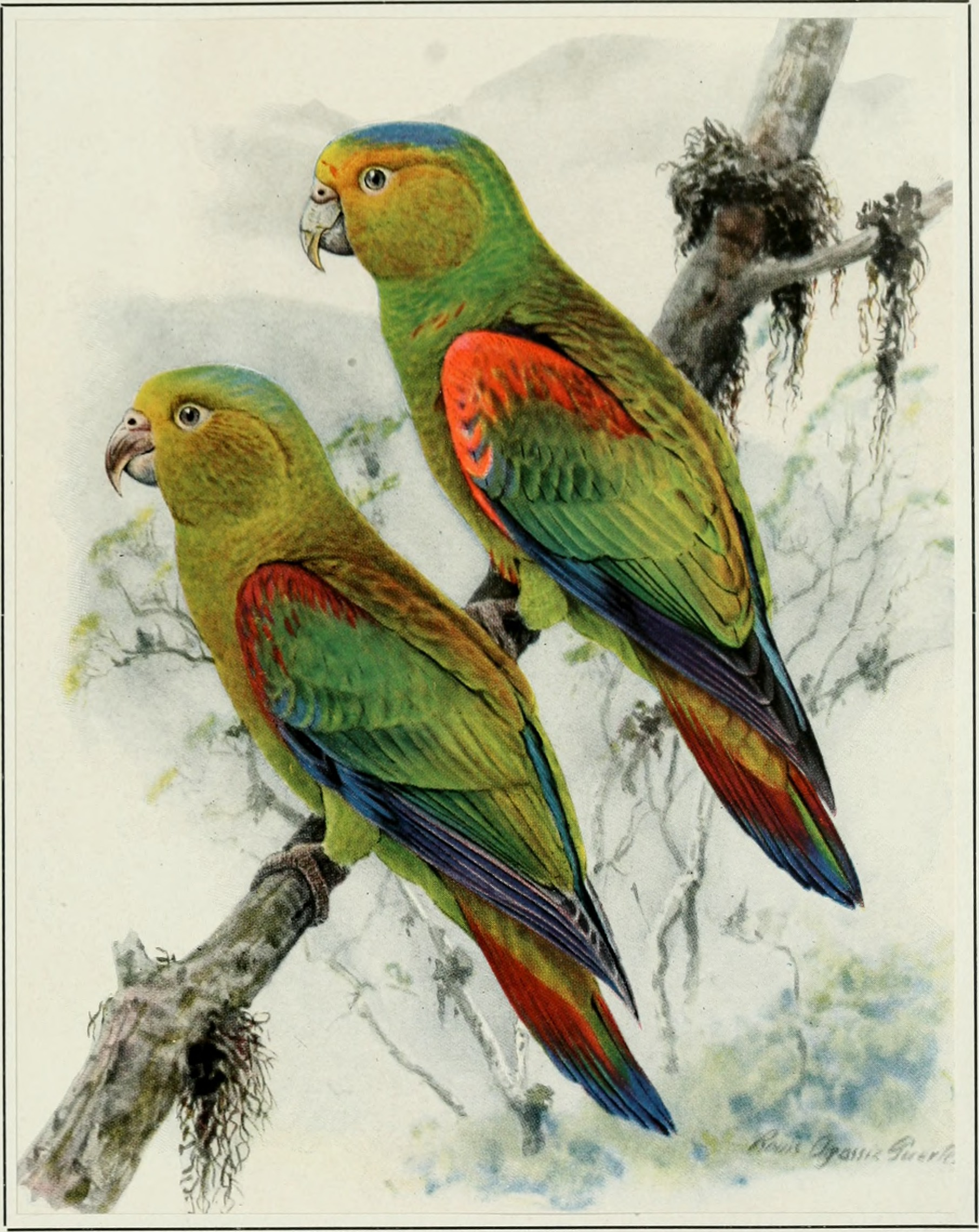
Fuertes's parrot, named after Louis Agassiz Fuertes

Fuertes is commemorated by two species. One is a species named by his colleague Frank Chapman as Icterus fuertesi, although it is now considered a subspecies of the orchard oriole. The other, Fuertes's parrot, or Hapalopsittaca fuertesi, was rediscovered in 2002 after 91 years of presumed extinction.

In 1927, the Boy Scouts of America made Fuertes an Honorary Scout, a new category of Scout created that same year. This distinction was given to "American citizens whose achievements in outdoor activity, exploration and worthwhile adventure are of such an exceptional character as to capture the imagination of boys...". The other eighteen who were awarded this distinction were: Roy Chapman Andrews; Robert Bartlett; Frederick Russell Burnham; Richard E. Byrd; George Kruck Cherrie; James L. Clark; Merian C. Cooper; Lincoln Ellsworth; George Bird Grinnell; Charles A. Lindbergh; Donald Baxter MacMillan; Clifford H. Pope; George Palmer Putnam; Kermit Roosevelt; Carl Rungius; Stewart Edward White; Orville Wright.

Apart from mentoring George Miksch Sutton, Fuertes influenced many later wildlife artists including Roger Tory Peterson, Jörg Kühn, Courtenay Brandreth, and Conrad Roland. The Wilson Ornithological Society established the Louis Agassiz Fuertes Award in 1947. Fuertes also painted dozens of mammal portraits for The National Geographic Magazine in 1916 and 1918, and inspired the society to hire an artist of their own, Walter A. Weber.

Many of Fuertes' paintings remain popular with collectors. In particular, a 1924 oil painting, Wild Turkey, sold for $86,250 at a January 2012 auction in New York and his other works command even higher prices to private collectors around the world.

== Selected works ==
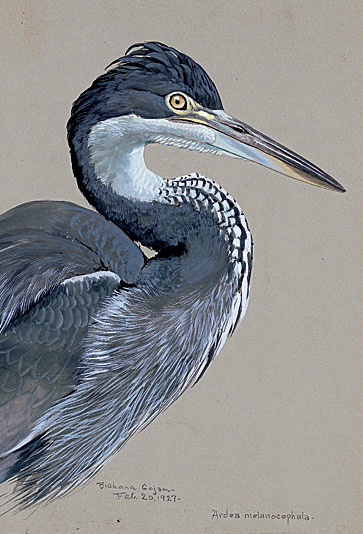
Black-headed Heron, watercolor (1927)

Fuertes' earliest commissions included 25 large decorative panels for F. F. Brewster of New Haven, Connecticut. This was followed by some murals at the Flamingo Hotel, of Miami, Florida and some paintings for the New York Zoological Society. He was much sought after later, illustrating books, plates for journals and magazine. Working with impressions from the field and from freshly collected specimens, Fuertes' works are considered some of the most accurate and natural depictions of birds. He had an ability to capture the bird in action and reproduce illustrations from a mental image. Apart from illustrations, he wrote some full length articles including one on falconry in the National Geographic and another on dogs. The cover of the journal Auk published by the American Ornithologists' Union was designed by Fuertes. Some of the books that he illustrated include:

- A-Birding on a Bronco, by Florence A. Merriam, 1896 (scanned)
- Citizen Bird by Mabel Osgood Wright and Elliott Coues. Macmillan Company, 1896 (1923 reprint)
- Song Birds and Water Fowl, by H E Parkhurst, 1897 (scanned)
- Bird Craft, by M. Osgood Wright, 1897 (1900 reprint)
- The Woodpeckers, by F H Eckstorm, 1901 (scanned)
- Second Book of Birds, by Olive Thorne Miller (pseudonym of Mrs. Harriet Mann Miller), 1901 (scanned)
- Birds of the Rockies, by Leander S. Keyser 1902 (scanned)
- Handbook of Birds of Western North America, by Frank Chapman, 1902 (1904 reprint)
- Upland Game Birds, by Edwyn Sandys and T S van Dyke, 1902 (scanned)
- Key to North American Birds by Elliott Coues, 1903 (scanned)
- Handbook of Birds of Eastern North America, by Frank M. Chapman, 1904 (scanned)
- Birds of New York by Elon Howard Eaton, 1910 (scanned)
- Wild Animals of North America by Edward W. Nelson, 1918 (scanned)
- The Burgess Bird Book for Children, by Thornton W. Burgess, 1919 The Burgess Bird Book For Children
- Birds of Massachusetts and Other New England States by Edward Howe Forbush, 1925 (1927 edition)
- Artist and Naturalist in Ethiopia by Wilfred Hudson Osgood. Garden City: Doubleday, Doran and Co., 1936
- The Bird Life of Texas by Harry Church Oberholser. University of Texas Press, 1974

=== Gallery ===
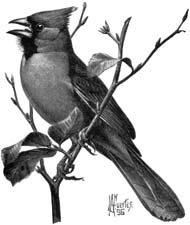
Cardinal, from Citizen Bird (1897)

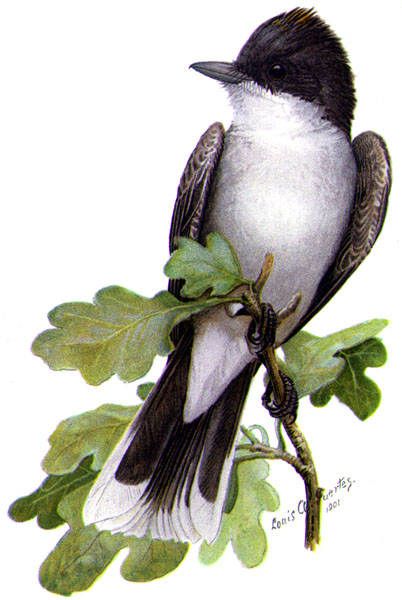
Eastern kingbird, from The Second Book of Birds (1901)

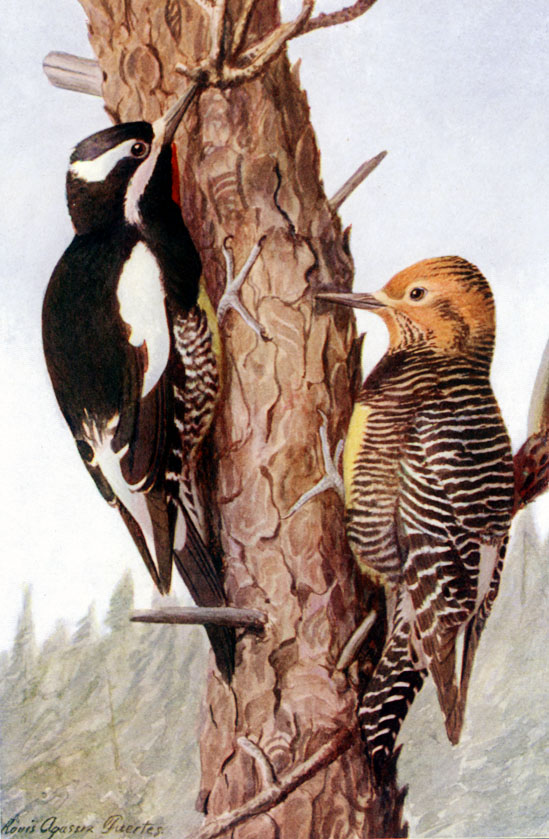
Williamson's sapsucker, from Birds of the Rockies (1902)

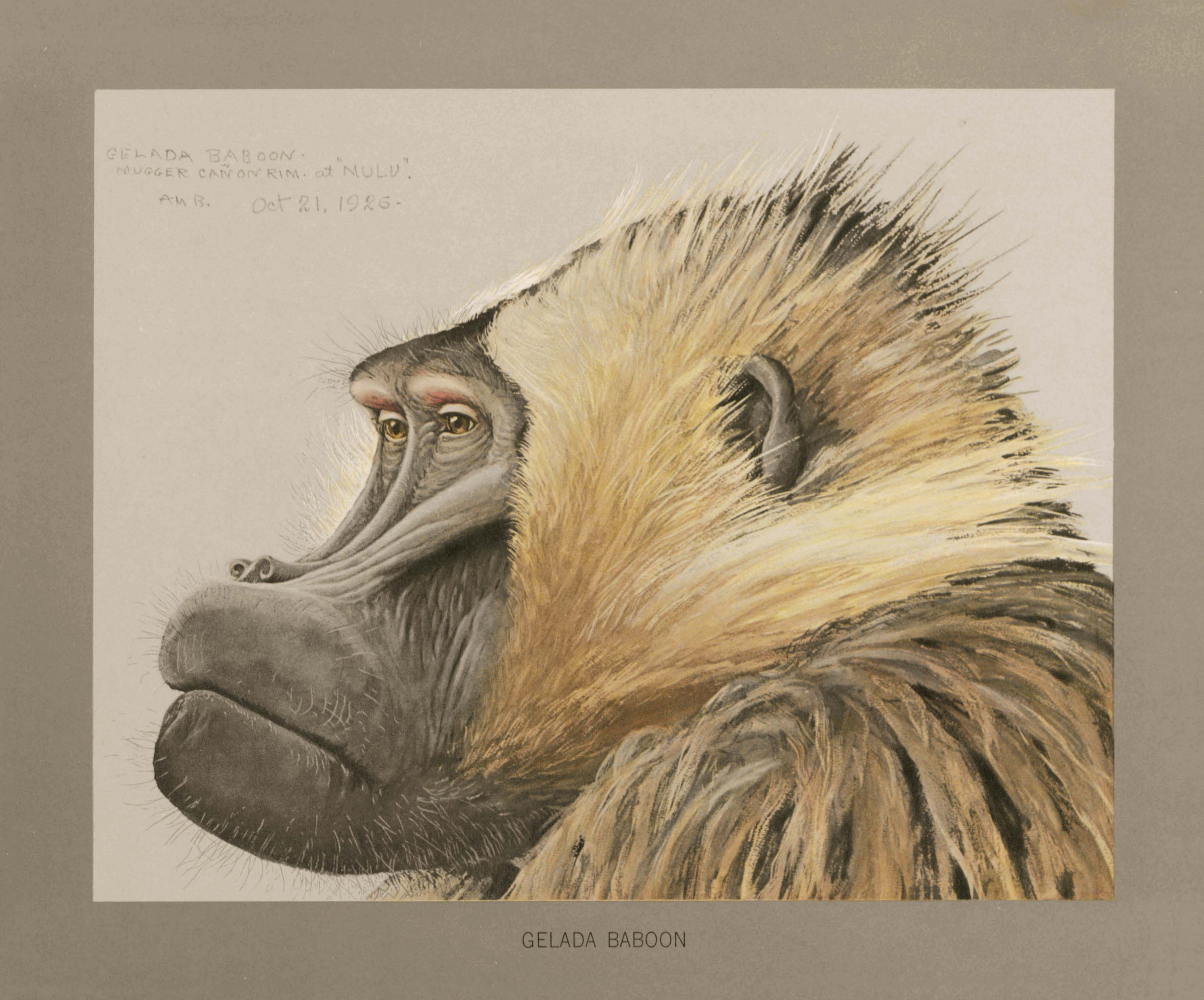
Gelada baboon from Album of Abyssinian Birds and Mammals (1930)

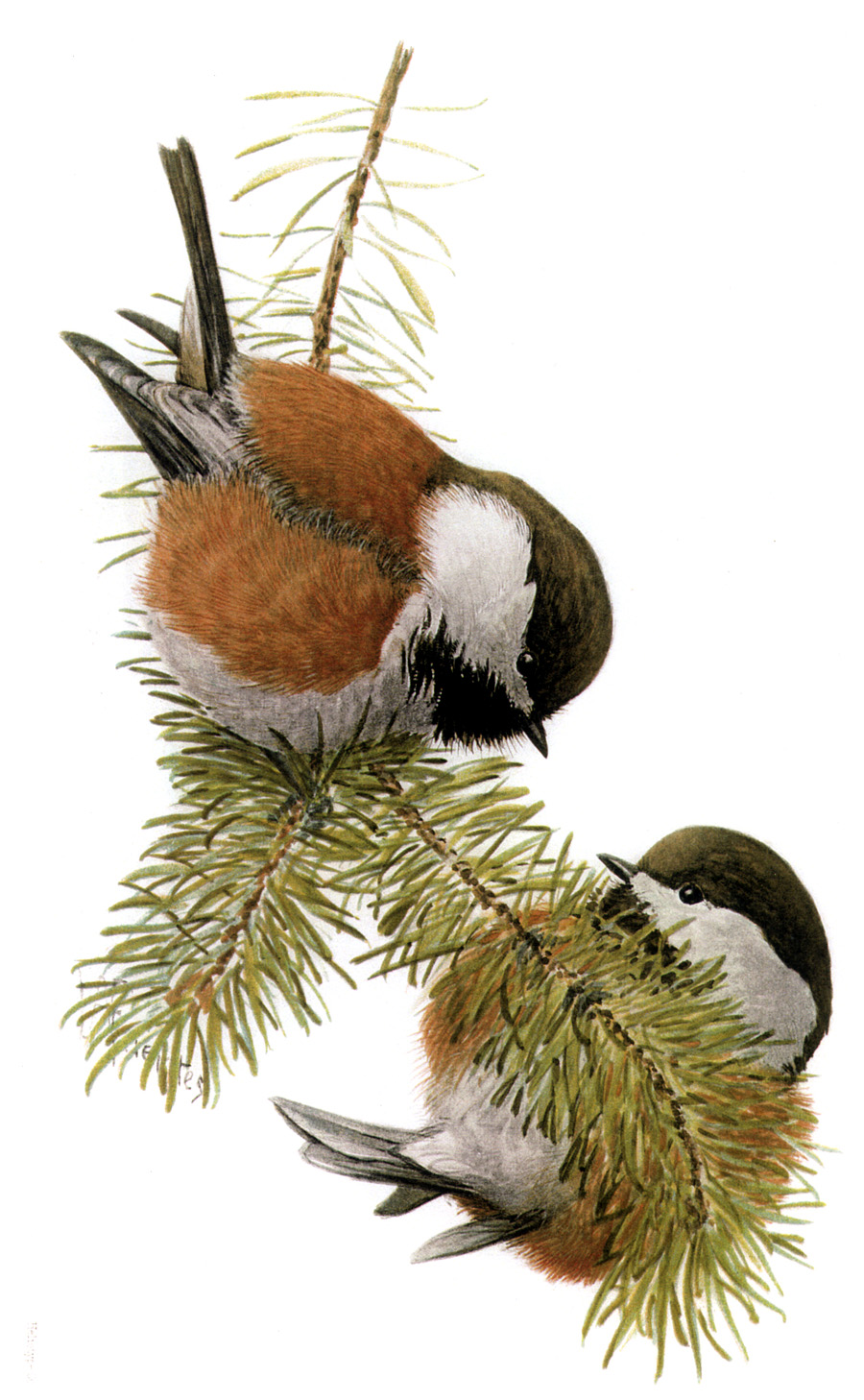
Chestnut-backed chickadee, from Harriman Alaska Series (1904)

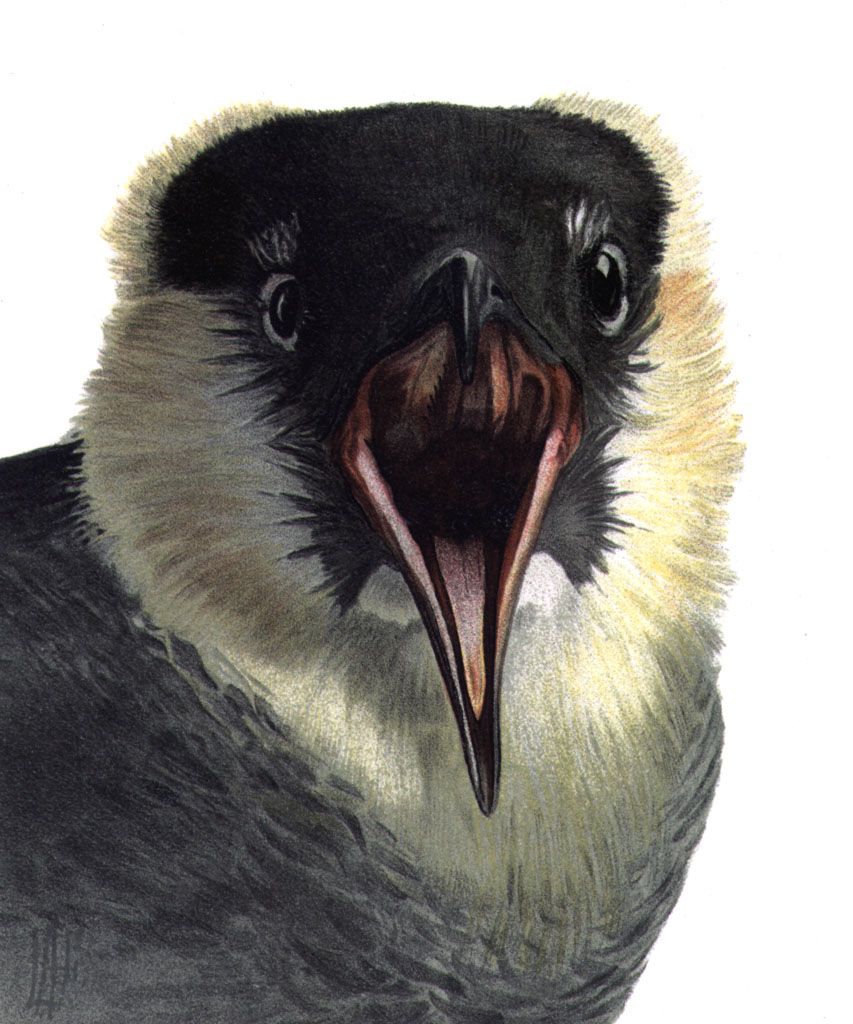
Pomarine jaeger, from Harriman Alaska Series (1904)

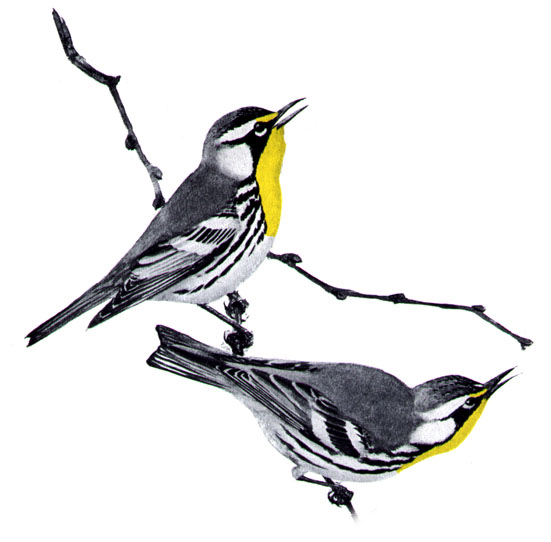
Yellow-throated warbler, from Warblers of North America (1907)

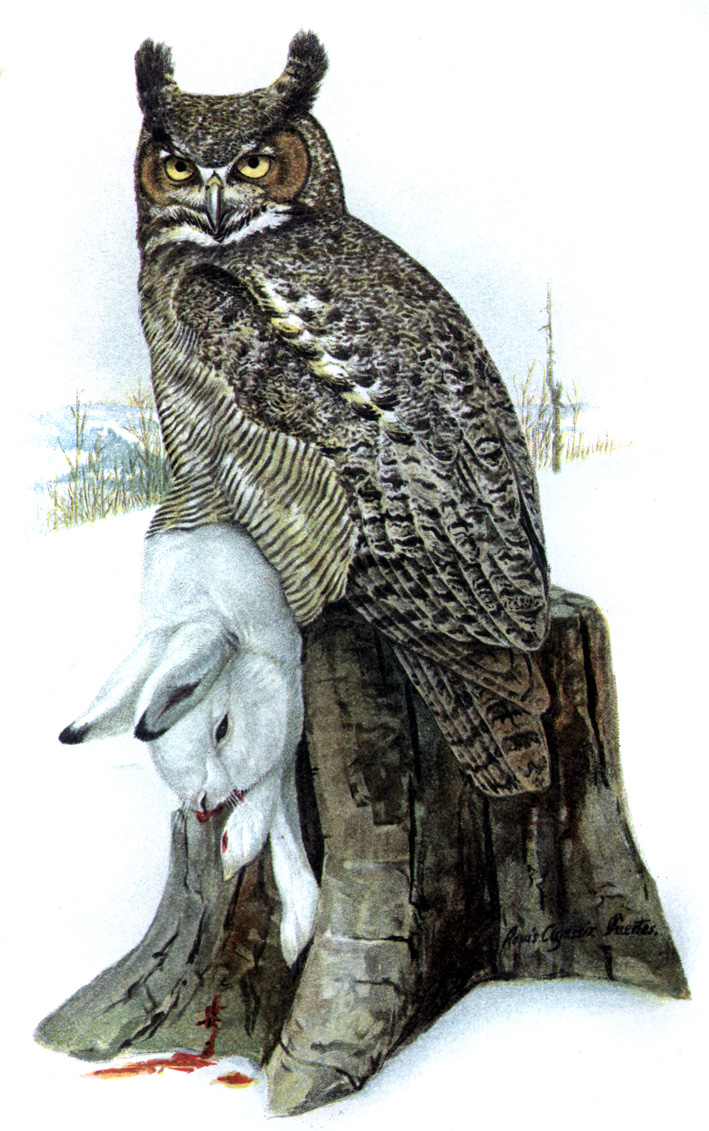
Great horned owl, from United States Department of Agriculture Yearbook (1908)

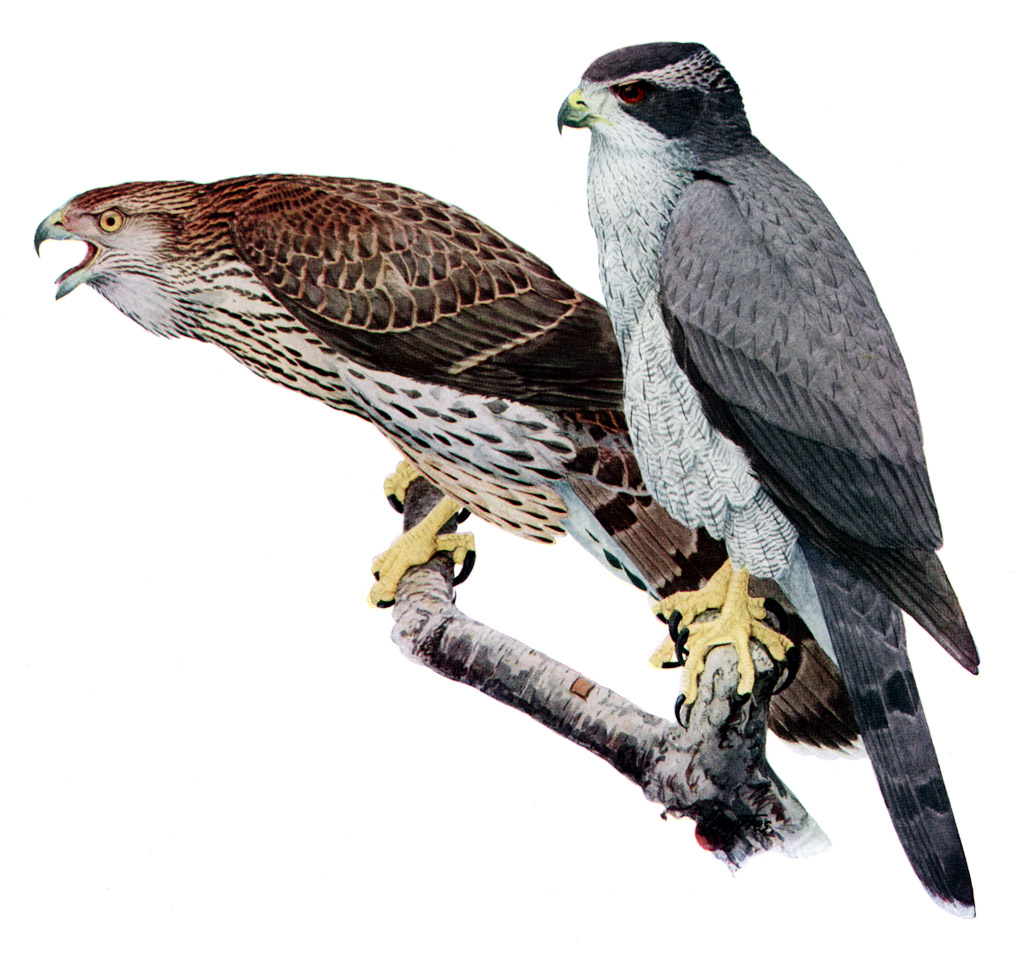
Goshawk, from Birds of New York (1910–1914)

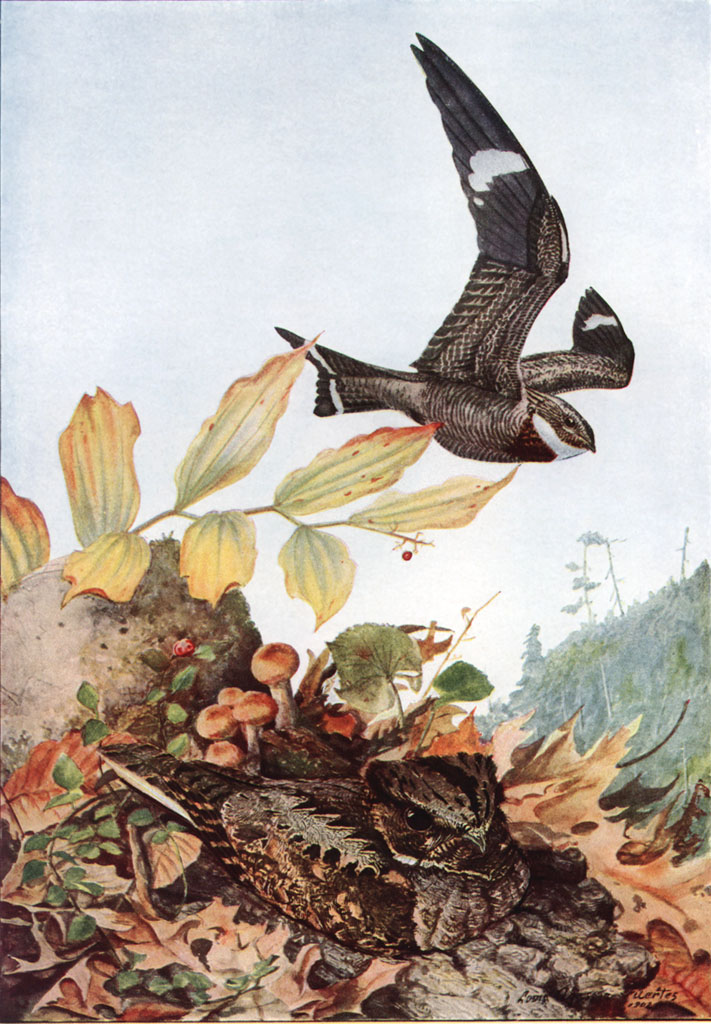
Nightjars, from Birds of New York (1910–1914)

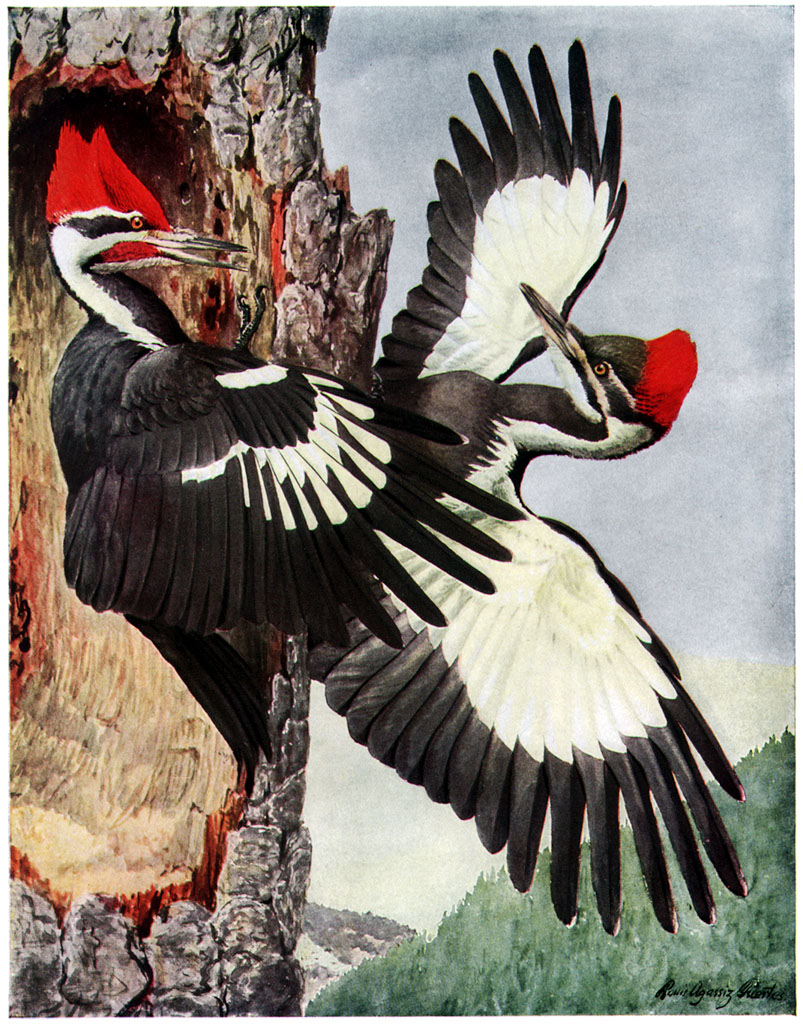
Pileated woodpecker, from Birds of New York (1910–1914)

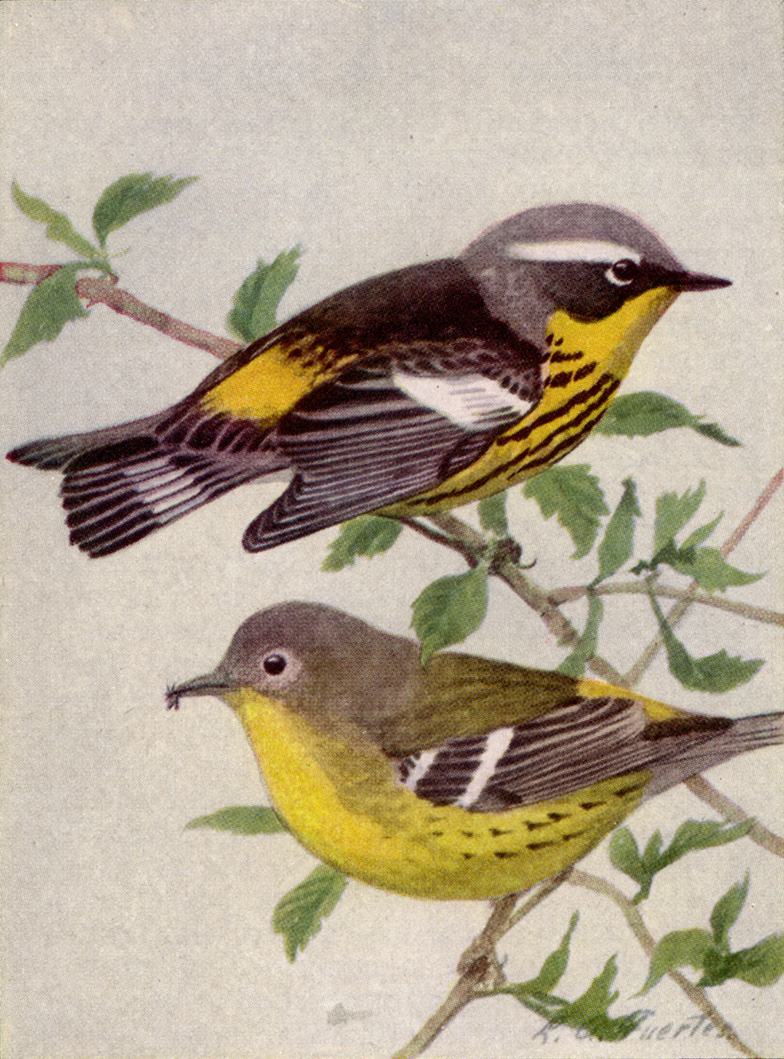
Magnolia warbler, from The Warblers of North America (National Geographic, 1917)

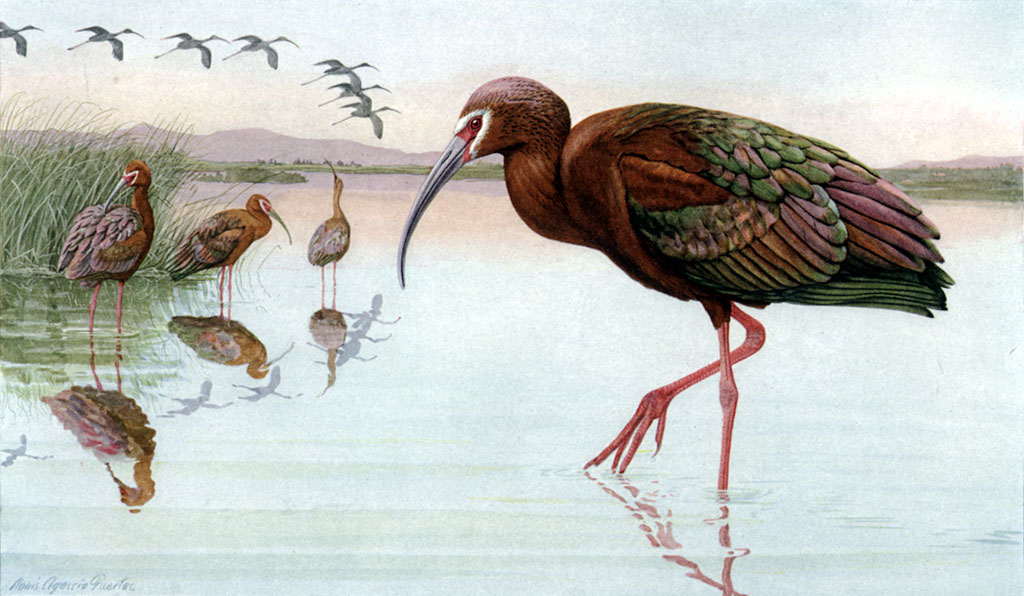
White-faced ibis, from Game Birds of California (1918)

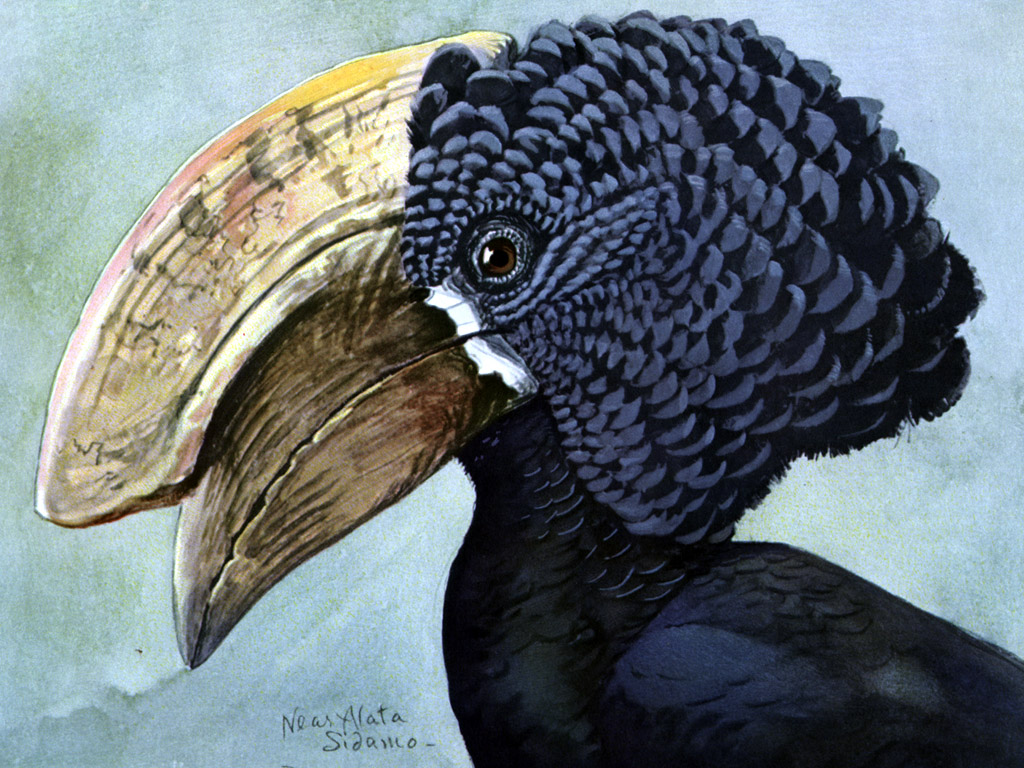
Silvery-cheeked hornbill, from Album of Abyssinian Birds and Mammals (1930)

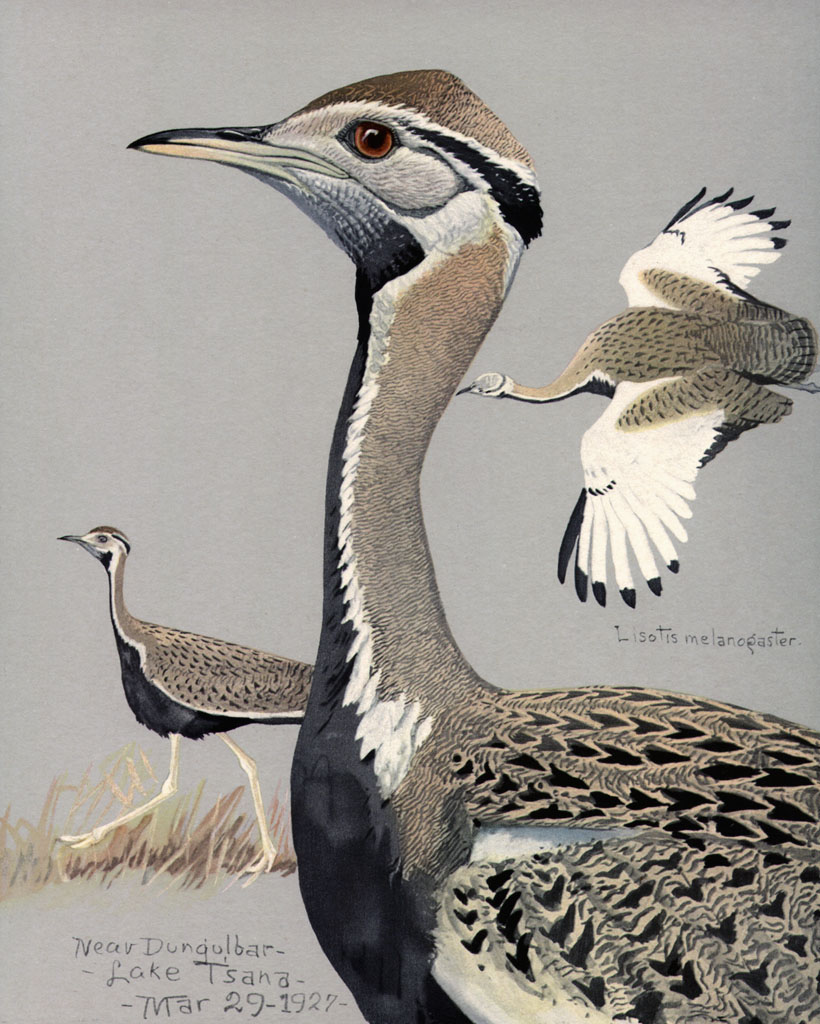
Black-bellied bustard, from Album of Abyssinian Birds and Mammals (1930)

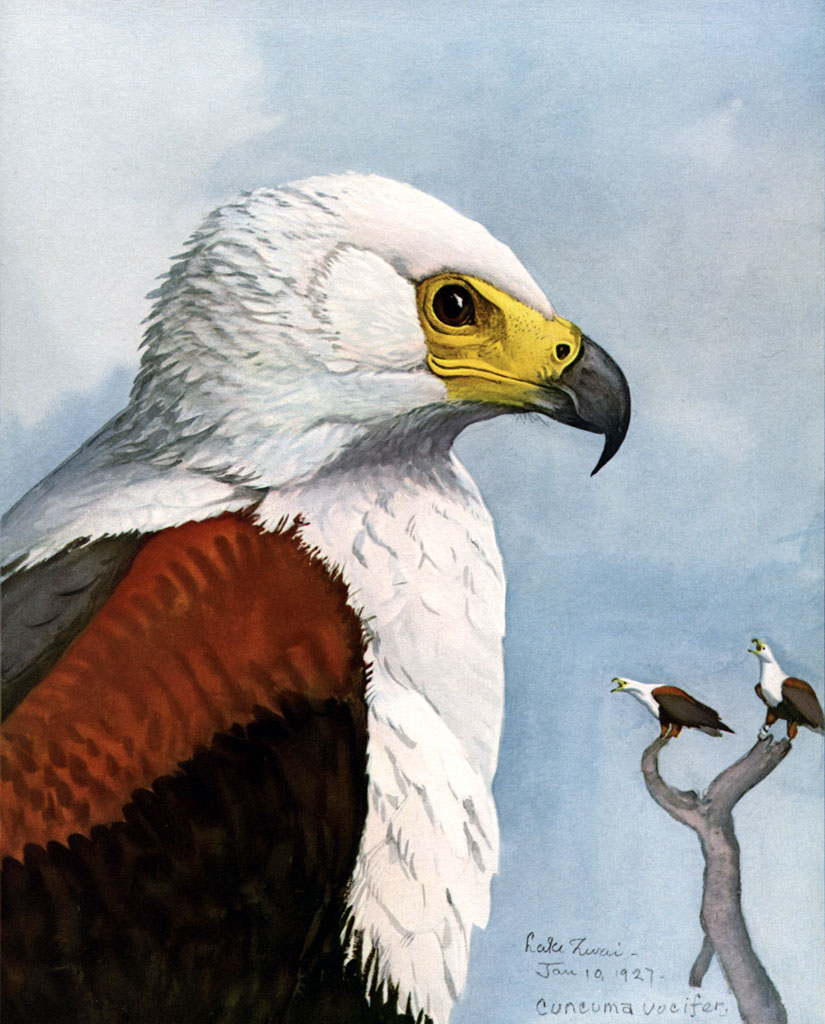
African fish eagle, from Album of Abyssinian Birds and Mammals (1930)

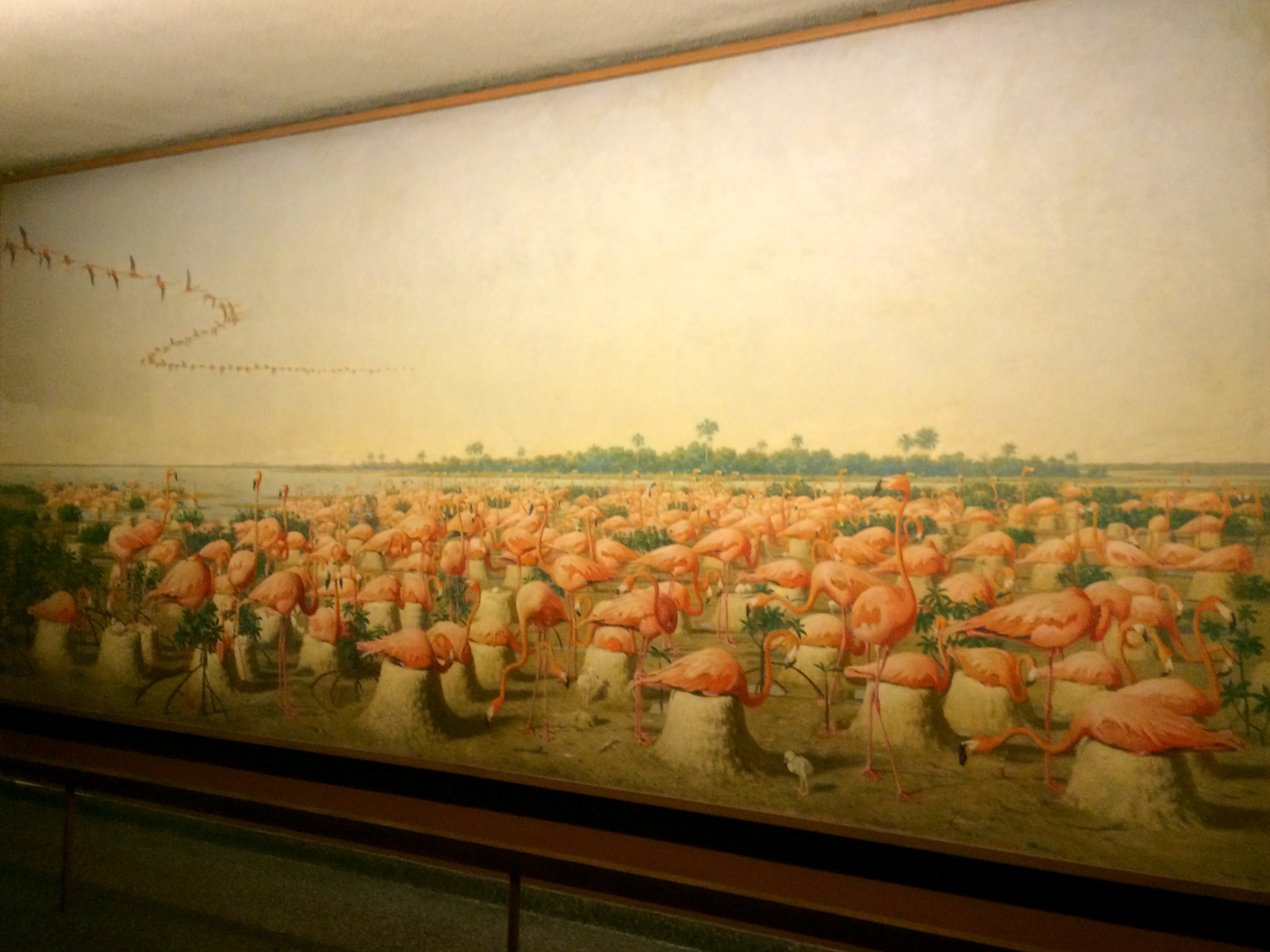
Flamingo mural at the American Museum of Natural History

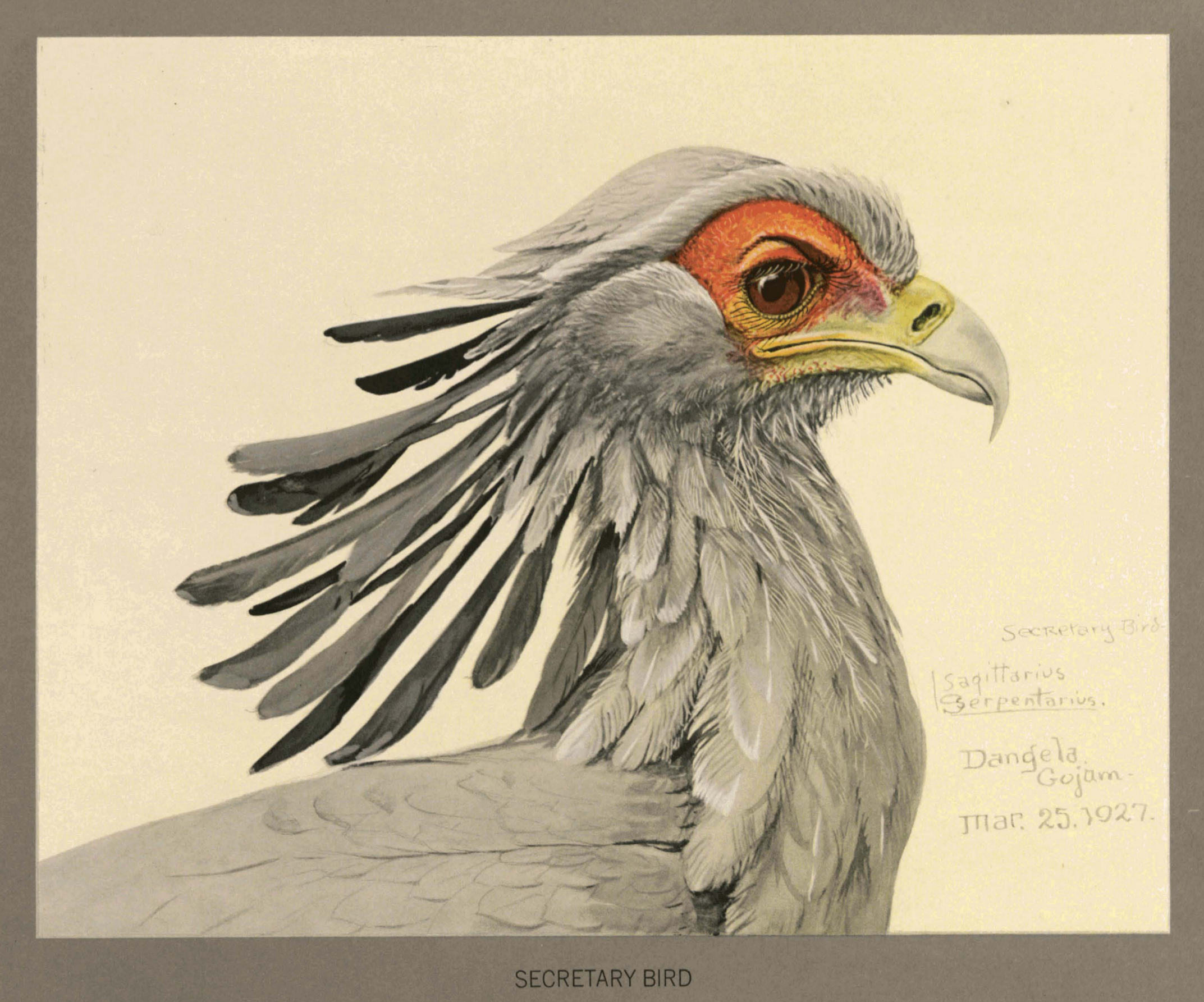
Secretary bird, from Album of Abyssinian Birds and Mammals (1930)

== Other sources ==
- Boynton, Mary Fuertes (Ed.) 1956. Louis Agassiz Fuertes: his life briefly told and his correspondence. Oxford University Press.
- Norelli, Martina R. American Wildlife Painting (Fuertes, Audubon, Heade, Wilson, Thayer, Catesby) Watson-Guptill Publications, 1975. ISBN 0-8230-0217-9
