= Murder of Maria Fuertes =

2020 murder in New York City

Maria Eusebia Fuertes (August 14, 1927 – January 6, 2020) was a 92-year-old immigrant from the Dominican Republic living in New York City when she was raped and killed. A Guyanese illegal immigrant has been charged with her murder.

== Political impact ==
The case is part of what the Associated Press describes as "an escalating conflict between the Trump administration and the nation’s largest city over its so-called sanctuary policies."

== Victim ==
Fuertes, elderly and impoverished, kept 10 cats and made a living by collecting discarded cans and bottles, returning them for the recycling fee. She was in the United States as a legal immigrant. Fuertez granddaughter, Daria Ortiz, blames New York's sanctuary city policy for her grandmother's death. Fuertez son, Louis, stated that he agreed with sanctuary city policies but was critical of the police for allowing "criminals" to walk the streets.

== Events ==
On November 27, 2019, Reeaz Khan, 21, an illegal immigrant from Guyana, was accused of attacking his father with a broken ceramic mug; Kahn's 41-year-old father was hospitalized for injuries he received. Khan was charged with harassment, criminal possession of a weapon, and misdemeanor assault.

The U.S. Immigration and Customs Enforcement claims to have lodged a detainer request for Kahn with the New York City Police Department on November 27, 2019, but declined to release its content or evidence of sending it that day. In a statement, the NYPD said it did not receive an ICE detainer.

On November 27, 2019, Khan was released without bail.

On January 6, 2020, Khan allegedly raped and strangled Maria Fuertes. She was discovered lying on a sidewalk in Richmond Hill, Queens in freezing weather. She was taken to Jamaica Hospital Medical Center, where she died. Her injuries included a broken spine and fractured ribs.

On January 10, 2020, Khan was charged with murder.

On January 17, 2020, Acting Director of U.S. Immigration and Customs Enforcement Matthew Albence asserted that New York's sanctuary city policy was responsible for the killing of Maria Fuertes.

On February 4, 2020, in his State of the Union address, President Donald Trump said that "Just 29 days ago, a criminal alien freed by the sanctuary city of New York was charged with the brutal rape and murder of a 92-year-old woman. The killer had been previously arrested for assault, but under New York’s sanctuary policies, he was set free. If the city had honored ICE’s detainer request, his victim would be alive today.”

On June 20, 2023, Khan pleaded guilty to killing Fuertes. On July 6, 2023, Khan was sentenced to 22 years to life for the murder charge and eight years in prison for the attempted rape charge, with the sentences running concurrently.
