= José María Mohedano Fuertes =

Spanish lawyer and politician

José María Mohedano Fuertes (1948, Madrid, Spain) is a Spanish lawyer and politician who belongs to the Spanish Socialist Workers' Party (PSOE).

Mohedano gained a degree in law from the Complutense University of Madrid and also qualified to be a journalist through a church school. He became involved in politics in 1966 and joined the Communist Party of Spain in 1969, remaining a member until 1980. He was the main prosecutor in the case of Yolanda González, a student and member of the Trotskyist Socialist Worker's Party who was assassinated in February 1980 by members of the far right party New Force.

In 1986 he then joined the PSOE and three years later was elected to the Spanish Congress of Deputies representing Valencia Province and was re-elected at the subsequent election in 1993 although he was forced to leave the PSOE group for a period following controversy surrounding his acceptance of a Jaguar car given to him by a private company. He did not stand at the 1996 General Election and returned to legal work, contributing to the creation of a new penal code.
