= Estevan Antonio Fuertes =

Puerto Rican-American civil engineer and professor (1838-1903)

Estevan A. Fuertes
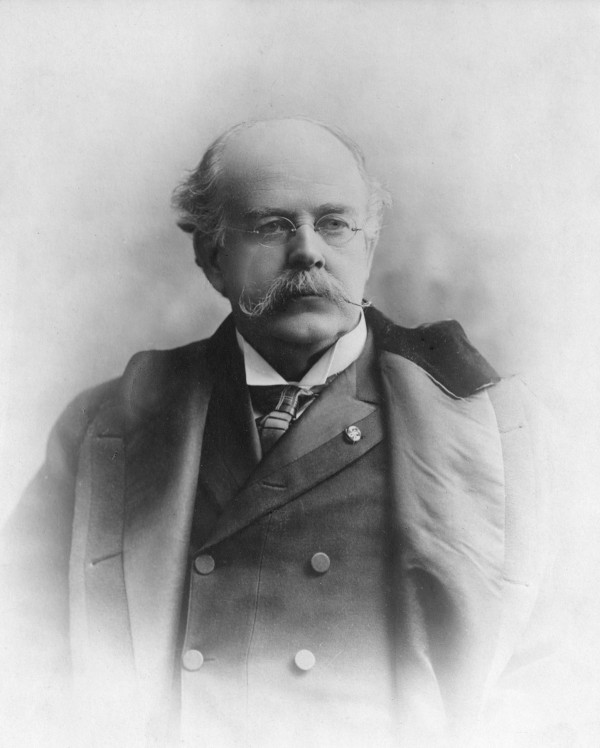
- Born: May 10, 1838; San Juan, Puerto Rico
- Died: January 16, 1903 (aged 64); Ithaca, New York
- Resting place: Lake View Cemetery
- Education: Troy Polytechnic Institute, BSCE
- Spouse: Mary Stone Perry (m. 1860)
- Children: James Hillhouse Fuertes, Louis Agassiz Fuertes
- Engineering career
- Discipline: Civil engineering, Astronomy
- Institutions: Cornell University

Estevan Antonio Fuertes (May 10, 1838 – January 16, 1903) was a Puerto Rican-American civil engineer and professor of astronomy at Cornell University.

== Biography ==
Born in San Juan, Puerto Rico, Estevan Antonio Fuertes was the son of Estevan and Demetria Cherbonnier Fuertes. He received his education at Salamanca, Spain, and at the Rensselaer Polytechnic Institute of Troy, New York.

From 1861 to 1863, he was assistant engineer in the Department of Public Works, Puerto Rico, and subsequently served as director of public works for the western district of that island. Coming to the United States in 1864, he was successively assistant engineer and engineer to the Croton Aqueduct Board, and prepared a valuable report on the connection of the Croton water supply with the manufactures of New York City.

From 1870 to 1871, he was chief engineer of the American Isthmian Canal expeditions to Tehuantepec and Nicaragua to investigate and report on the practicability of a ship canal connecting the Caribbean and the Pacific Ocean

In 1873, he was appointed founding dean of the Civil Engineering Department of Cornell University, and from 1890 to 1902 directed the Cornell's College of Civil Engineering advancing its research and technical programs to its then "state-of-the-art" modern standard.

In 1902, he was also appointed professor of astronomy at Cornell and supervised the construction of the A. C. Barnes Observatory.

The Fuertes Observatory (completed in 1917) on North Campus was subsequently named in his honor and remains in his name to this day.

On the international plane, Fuertes also is known for his visionary design and comprehensive planning of the drainage systems of Santos, Brazil.

He was a member of many scientific societies, American and foreign, and published numerous scientific articles and reports.

Fuertes died at his home in Ithaca, New York on January 16, 1903, and was buried at Lake View Cemetery.

== Family ==
On December 11, 1860, he married Mary Stone Perry. They had six children: Felix Juan, James Hillhouse, George Perry, Sarah Demetria, Mary Katherine Stamford, and Louis Agassiz.
