= Louise Klein Miller =

American landscape architect

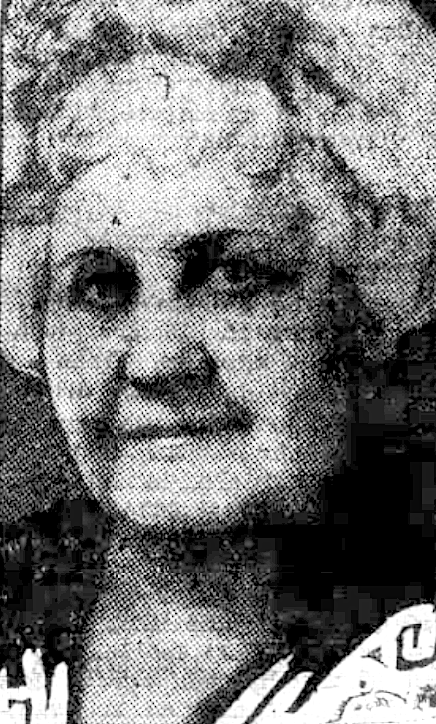
- Louise Klein Miller, from a 1924 publication
- Born: August 7, 1854 near Dayton, Ohio, U.S.
- Died: October 24, 1943 (age 89); Cleveland, Ohio, U.S.
- Occupations: Landscape architect, educator, gardens advocate

Signature
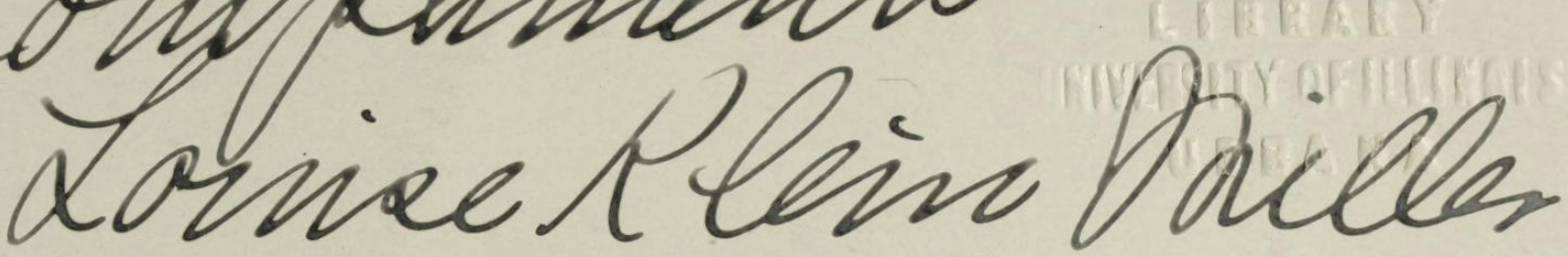

Louise Klein Miller (August 7, 1854 – October 24, 1943) was an American landscape architect, educator, and curator of school gardens for the Cleveland public school system.

== Early life and education ==
Miller was born on a farm near Dayton, Ohio and raised in Miamisburg, Ohio, the daughter of William Miller and Ann Cline Miller. After teaching for years in Dayton, she graduated from Cook County Normal School in 1893. Influenced by Francis Wayland Parker and Wilbur S. Jackman, she pursued further studies as one of the first women students of the Cornell University State College of Forestry.

== Career ==
Miller taught school in Dayton as a young woman. She taught at the Lowthorpe School of Horticulture and Landscape Gardening for Women in Massachusetts, and designed the Lowthorpe Garden. In 1904, she became head of the Cleveland Board of Education's Department of School Gardens. The program founded eight elementary school gardens and home gardens for students. While there, she designed a memorial garden to commemorate the 172 victims of a school fire in Collinwood, Ohio in 1910.

After she retired from the Cleveland schools in 1938, she was in charge of the grounds at the Blossom Hill School for Girls in Brecksville, Ohio. She lectured on her work to community groups, and wrote several books.

Miller was vice-president of the National Plant, Flower and Fruit Guild, and of the School Gardening Association of America. She was a fellow of the American Association for the Advancement of Science. She was awarded life membership in the National Council of State Garden Clubs.

== Publications ==
- Course in Nature Study for Detroit Schools (1896)
- Children’s Gardens for School and Home: A Manual for Cooperative Gardening (1904)
- "School Gardens" (1909)
- "A Garden that is a Memorial Forever" (1927)
- As I See It (1940)

== Personal life and legacy ==
Miller died in October 1943, at the age of 89, in Cleveland, a few weeks after speaking at the annual meeting of the Garden Club of Ohio. "She not only taught the art of raising flowers and vegetables, she helped people to overcome their quandaries," recalled an acquaintance in 1953. More a century after she designed it, the Collinwood School Fire Memorial Garden remains as a monument, though it was much reduced in size when it was redesigned in the 1990s. She is recognized as a leader in the American school gardens movement of the Progressive Era.
