= James Hillhouse Fuertes =

American civil and sanitary engineer (1863––1932)

- Born: August 10, 1863; Ponce, Puerto Rico
- Died: January 30, 1932 (aged 68); Brooklyn, New York, U.S.
- Resting place: Green-Wood Cemetery
- Education: Cornell University (BCE)
- Occupations: Civil and sanitary engineer
- Spouse: Mary Hill Cable (m. 1895; died 1931)
- Father: Estevan Antonio Fuertes
- Relatives: Louis Agassiz Fuertes (brother)

James Hillhouse Fuertes (August 10, 1863 - January 30, 1932) was an American civil and sanitary engineer. Born in Ponce, Puerto Rico, he was involved as a consulting engineer for water works projects in the United States, including those in New York City, Baltimore, and Pennsylvania cities Harrisburg and Lebanon. He also worked on projects in Winnipeg, Canada, and Santos, São Paulo, Brazil.

== Early life ==
James Hillhouse Fuertes was born on August 10, 1863, in Ponce, Puerto Rico, Mary Stone (née Perry) and Estevan Antonio Fuertes. His father was head of the civil engineering department of Cornell University. His brother was naturalist and painter Louis Agassiz Fuertes. He graduated with a Bachelor of Civil Engineering from Cornell University in 1883.

== Career ==
Fuertes worked as a city engineer in Wichita, Kansas. He later worked with railroads. In September 1890, he began work at York, Wood & Loonum, a firm building a line for a railroad south of Camden, Arkansas. He also did contract work for about two years. In 1899, he worked with Rudolph Hering to examine the plans for flood abatement in south Buffalo, New York. He designed and constructed the sanitary system of Santos, São Paulo, Brazil. and the water supply system of São Paulo. He conducted studies in Santos on the water supply, quarantine station, hospitals, paving, sewage, swamp drainage, storm water removal, and other improvements to stop yellow fever and smallpox.

Beginning in April 1902, Fuertes assisted Harrisburg, Pennsylvania, in designing and developing its water system. He worked for the city's Board of Public Works as a consulting engineer for more than 25 years. He helped plan the Mulberry Street Bridge, the Paxton Creek intercepting sewer, the Wildwood Lake dam and overflow spillway, the riverfront intercepting sewer, the river dam extending from the Cumberland County shore from Iron Alley, and the water department improvements, including the first filter plant on Island Park. Around 1902, Fuertes worked as a consulting engineer and helped develop the municipal water system of Lebanon, Pennsylvania, and replace its old 12-inch main line with a 20-inch main line.

In 1906, Fuertes was appointed by Mayor George B. McClellan Jr. as a member of the Metropolitan Sewerage Commission of New York City. He was re-appointed twice. He wrote a report to the New York Merchants' Association on the water supply of New York City. The report covered all possible supply sources and represented field investigations covering several thousand square miles. He also reported to the mayor's expert water commission of Philadelphia on the future water supply of that city. That work was inclusive of investigations of all streams in the watersheds of the Delaware, Schuylkill, and Leigh Valleys.

In 1907, Fuertes was a member of the first consulting board of four engineers on the water problem in Winnipeg. He served again on the 1913 commission of three engineers. He served as a consultant starting in 1914 on the construction of the US$15,000,000 98-mile Greater Winnipeg Water District Aqueduct of Shoal Lake as a consultant engineer. He also designed and constructed the purification works of Denver. He directed projects in Hawaii. Until around 1931, he had offices in the Woolworth Building in New York City.

In 1919, Fuertes assisted Nicholas S. Hill Jr. in developing recommendations for the mayor of Baltimore's New Annex Advisory Commission. They surveyed independent water companies and the water supply for the new Annex in Baltimore. Their recommendations led to the November 1920 Gunpowder River Plan, which called for a 240-foot dam and a 22.5 billion gallon Loch Raven Reservoir. Fuertes also supported a water works project in Cumberland, Maryland.

Around 1924, Fuertes was recalled by Harrisburg as an engineer when US$1,600,000 was approved for improvements to its water system, including its filter plant, pumping station, and the main line from the pumping station. Fuerte's work on Harrisburg's filtration system was challenged in a federal court for patent infringement, but Fuertes won the case. He was a member of the American Society of Civil Engineers.

== Personal life ==
Fuertes married Mrs. Mary Hill Cable on January 16, 1895, in Camden, Arkansas. His wife died in 1931. He had three stepchildren. He lived on East 17th Street in Brooklyn, New York.

Fuertes had a cerebral hemorrhage and died on January 30, 1932, aged 68, at his home in Brooklyn. He was buried in Green-Wood Cemetery.

== Works ==
- Water and Public Health (1897)
- Water Filtration Works (1901)
- "European Sanitary Engineering Series" in the Engineering Record

Fuertes also wrote monographs on engineering and sanitation.

== Awards ==
In 1907, Fuertes received the Fuertes Gold Medal from Cornell University for his water supply report for New York City. The medal had been established in the memory of his father.
