= Sofronije =

Sofronije may refer to:

- Sofronije Podgoričanin (1668 - 1711), the Metropolitan of Karlovac
- Sofronije Kirilović (died 1786), Serbian Orthodox bishop in the Habsburg
- Sofronije Jugović-Marković (fl. 1789), Habsburg Serb writer and activist in Russian service
- Sofronije Ravaničanin, Bishop of the Serbian Archdiocese of Arad from 1722 to 1726

== See also ==
- Sofronie
- Sofron
