= Sophronia Wilson Wagoner =

American missionary and social worker

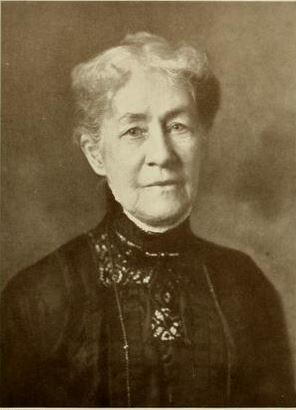
Sophronia Wilson Wagoner, Kajiwara Photo

Sophronia Zulema Wilson Wagoner (1834 – February 9, 1929) was a pioneer worker in the missionary field and leader in social work for more than 60 years.

== Early years and education ==
Sophronia Zulema Wilson was born in 1834, at Eaton, Ohio. She attended school at Oxford Seminary, Ohio, class of 1853.

== Career ==
After completing her education, she taught school for several years. Her first husband, Harry Epply, died soon after their marriage, and she accepted the offer of her brother-in-law and his wife to go live with them in Cincinnati. There she met H.H. Wagoner and his wife, who was dying of tuberculosis. She took care of the woman, and after her death, of the woman's daughter, who also died of tuberculosis. After that she married Henry Hoover Wagoner in 1861. He was a native of Maryland. They had two sons, George C.R. and Harry Epply (who later married Adeline Palmier Wagoner). Three other children died young. The Wagoners moved to St. Louis in 1866, and since that year Wagoner stood first in the ranks of those women who devote much of their lives to missionary and charitable work.

As a pioneer worker in the missionary field, Wagoner stood among the first who interested themselves in this cause in St. Louis. She was one of the charter members of the first Auxiliary of the Woman's Foreign Missionary Society, organized west of the Mississippi River. It was founded on April 4, 1870. Many donations to Foreign Missions were made by and through her efforts, and memorials and scholarships in India and Japan bearing her name stood as a glowing tribute to her untiring energy in this field. Wagoner found great satisfaction in the fact that she saw the Women's Foreign Missionary Society grow from a small organization which numbered about fifteen members to a circle that enlarged and reached every civilized country. In St. Louis at her time there were about ten societies, with three hundred or more members, each holding monthly meetings in the homes of the members. The first branch in St. Louis met at Union M. E. Church at Eleventh and Locust Streets. Jennie Fowler Willing was the organizer; Mrs. T. C. Fletcher, wife of ex-Governor Fletcher, was the president; Mesdames Clinton B. Fisk, E. 0. Stanard, J. N. Schureman, Wagoner, B. B. Bonner, Kennedy and Mrs. Woodburn were charter members. The Des Moines branch — an outgrowth of the meeting held in Union M. E. Church — had a membership of about 20,000. In 1912 more than $75,000 was collected to carry on the work in India, China, Japan, Korea, Mexico, Italy, Africa and other distant countries. The membership dues were two cents ($65 in 2024 dollars) a week and a daily prayer. The first work of the society was to assist in building a schoolhouse in Tokyo, Japan, for educating girls. When it was completed, one scholarship was taken by the society and the girl selected was educated and graduated from the school with honors. The girl was Sophia Wagoner, named after Sophronia Wilson Wagoner. The Des Moines branch, comprising Iowa, Missouri and Arkansas, had forty-seven woman missionaries in various parts of the world, managing schools, colleges, hospitals, where many thousands of girls were educated in industrial and other lines of work, which tended to make them useful homekeepers, teachers and nurses. Sophronia Wilson Wagoner was district president for many years and had an interest in various schools in India and China. The first secretary was Mrs. Pierce; Mrs. Lucy Prescott was the first correspondence secretary. It was called the "Western Branch". Mrs. William A. Jones was the first treasurer. When the headquarters were transferred to Des Moines, the wife of Bishop Hamline was made president. At Thaudaung, India, Burmah, stood a chapel called the "Wagoner", which was a personal donation by Wagoner to the mission.

Wagoner supported a scholarship at Jubblepore, India, for twenty years. Wagoner took a special interest in all of these movements and was identified with the missionary work in St. Louis for over forty years. She made addresses before the different auxiliary branches of the societies and to the delegates. There had been no meeting of any importance in this field of endeavor that Wagoner, by her earnest appeals, had not induced and influenced to give liberal support to the cause put before them.

She was for 29 years the vice-president of the Central Mission organized on September 13, 1884; the mission became the Boyle Memorial Center, and was inter-denominational hosting The Industrial School. The Central Mission was organized with Mrs. Wilbur Boyle as president; Sophronia Wilson Wagoner as vice-president; Mrs. Elmer Adams as treasurer; Miss Capen as secretary; Mrs. Sue Owens as missionary; Mrs. Andrew Sproule, Mrs. Hodgman, Mrs. Given Campbell and Mrs. Price as managers. The work was industrial and Sunday school. A church was organized, and in a short time a new building was erected on Eleventh Street, St. Louis, between Franklin Avenue and Morgan Street. After the death of Mrs. Boyle, the name was changed to Boyle Center in her honor. The work was enlarged with the Rev. Clyde Smith as pastor and Mrs. Sue Owens as missionary.

She also acted as first president of the Women's Christian Temperance Union, which was organized in January, 1880, by Elizabeth Greenwood, of Baltimore, for years the national evangelist. Wagoner was identified with the work of the Woman's Christian Home, located at Fifth and Poplar Streets, St. Louis, and was a member of the Board of Managers. Mrs. Mary A. Clardy was the secretary. Only a few ladies responded at first to the call, as the work was new. This was carried on by the distribution of literature and evangelistic meetings held in churches and missions. The work soon progressed, and Wagoner was followed by Mrs. T. C. Fletcher as president. Other unions were organized in different parts of the city; a district association was formed. Mrs. E. B. Ingalls, Mrs. A. S. Cairns, J. Ellen Foster, Clara Hoffman and other women were active supporters. Their work was to hold evangelical meetings in the interest of temperance at the Bethel Mission and of supporting patients in a sanitarium on Cass Avenue, where persons were placed to be given treatment for the alcoholic habit. Among the many benefited by this institution were several ministers, who, after re-entering the field cured, did untold and far-reaching good for the cause.

She served several years as president of the "White Cross Home", a rescue home for young girls, which was first named the Magdalene Home. Later it was sold and became the Russell Home for Old Ladies. The Women's Home Mission assisted in the support of schools in the Highlander work, the mountaineers in Kentucky, North and South Carolina — schools for the education of the poor girls in the South, and also of the Afro-American children, and work among the Indians. Wagoner was district vice-president of this for over twenty years. At Gibson and Taylor Avenues, St. Louis, a Memorial Chapel was erected by Wagoner and her husband and fitted out complete as a donation to the Methodist Church. This was done in honor of H. H. Wagoner, Wagoner's husband. The White Cross Home was one of the first homes for rescue work for the girls. Their object was to provide shelter and a home for young girls who were in trouble. Mrs. D. W. Haydock was president of that organization for many years. Wagoner and Mrs. Hagerty also served in this capacity. Mrs. W. W. Culver took an active interest in the home and gave it her loyal support. This Home was a small house located on Garrison and Thomas Streets, St. Louis, and could accommodate twelve girls. Other institutions for this purpose were established and the ladies turned their interest to the Russell Home for Old Ladies, their first money coming from the sale of the White Cross Home.

Wagoner was also an early women's suffrage activist. In 1924, at 89 years old, she was asked about her activities, and her reply was "Just say that with any movement that was for the advancement of Christianity or opened doors of opportunity to women, I have been pleased to be identified."

She died on February 9, 1929, at her home at 4161 Lindell Boulevard, St. Louis.
