= Sophronia Bucklin =

American Civil War nurse

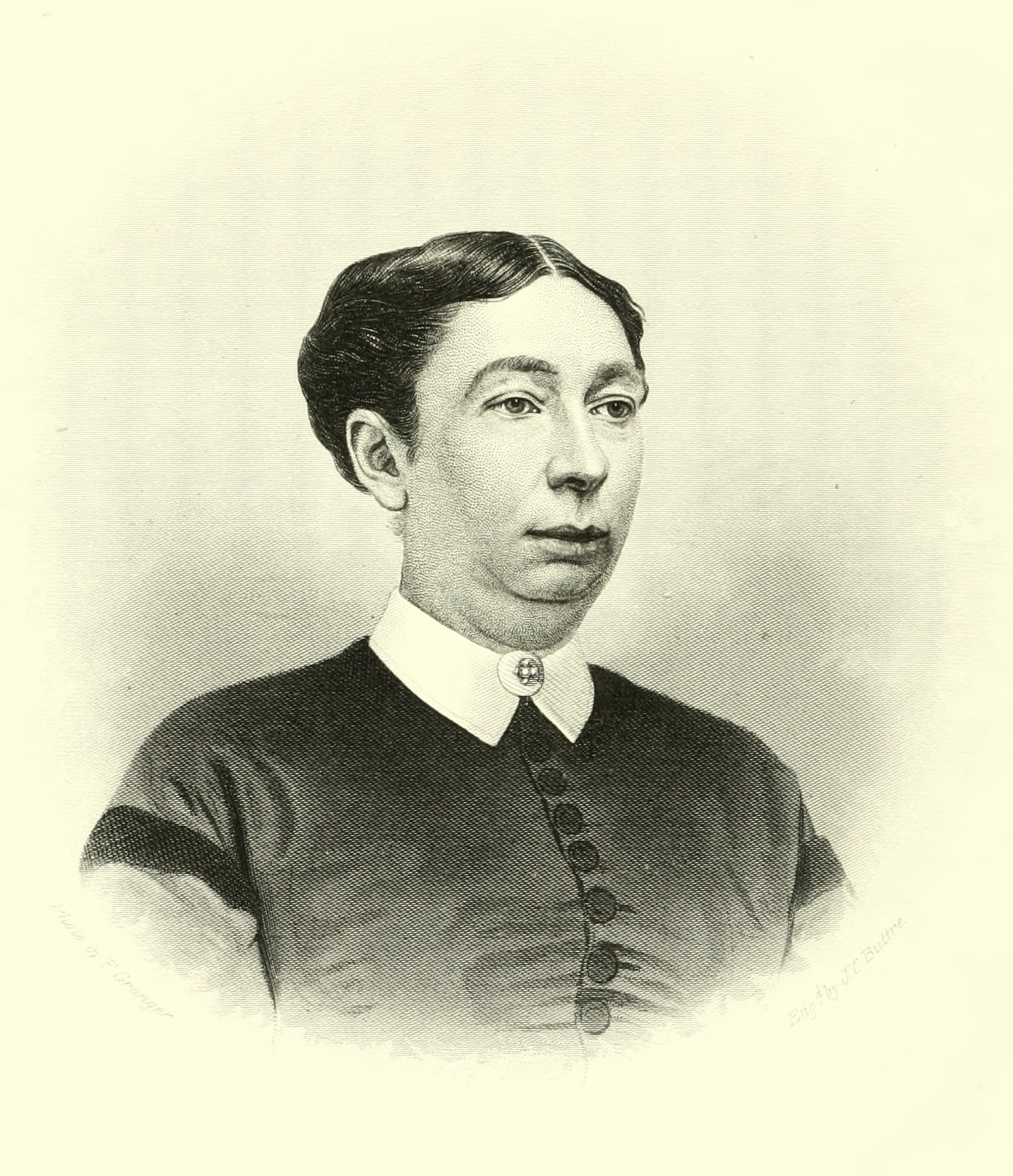
- Born: 1828; Ithaca, New York
- Died: 1902 (aged 73–74)
- Burial place: Lake View Cemetery
- Other name: Sophronia Brecklin
- Military career
- Allegiance: United States Union Army
- Unit: Nurse
- Conflicts: Gettysburg

Sophronia E. Bucklin (1828–1902, in other sources listed as "Sophronia Brecklin") was a nurse during the American Civil War. From Auburn, New York, Bucklin served for almost three years of the American Civil War. She worked with numerous hospitals and was present at many notable battles throughout the latter half of the war, until General Lee's surrender. Bucklin was devoted to the war effort, and though dependent on wages for her own living, felt the "same patriotism" as male volunteers.

== Civil War service ==
At the outbreak of the war, Bucklin was in her late 20s to early 30s, living independently as a seamstress in Auburn, New York. She enlisted her services for the Union effort, and left for the front on September 17, 1862, unaccompanied. As one of the many women serving under Dorothea Dix, Bucklin's service began at the Judiciary Hospital. A mere three months later, she was transferred to a Baptist church to take care of a nurse who had become ill.

Bucklin's most notable service, however, took place when she was moved to a point lookout at Chesapeake Bay for the winter. Here, she cared for men fighting at the battles of Antietam, Bull Run, and Fredericksburg. In March, Bucklin moved again to Alexandria, Virginia, and then went on to serve at Gettysburg as a field nurse. She recounts in a letter to Mary G. Holland that she was among the first to arrive at Gettysburg and one of the last to leave. Upon her arrival, Bucklin was faced with a line of soldiers awaiting surgery a mile and a half long. At the completion of Gettysburg, Bucklin spent the next seven or eight months nearby at Stoneman's Cavalry Hospital near Washington, D.C. In the winter of 1863, Bucklin came down with a fever. Her illness proved to be quite extensive, and in her aforementioned letter to Holland she writes that the other hospital staff left her for dead. Her illness, however, did not deter her from caring for patients.

All in all, Bucklin completed nearly three years total of service. She recounted her wartime experiences in her 1869 book, In Hospital and Camp: A Woman's Record of Thrilling Incidents Among the Wounded in the Late War. She died in Ithaca, New York, in 1902.
