= Made in America (TV program) =

- Host John Ratzenberger
- Also known as: John Ratzenberger's; Made in America
- Genre: Documentary
- Presented by: John Ratzenberger
- Country of origin: United States
- No. of seasons: 5
- No. of episodes: 97

Production
- Running time: 22 minutes

Original release
- Network: Travel Channel
- Release: January 6, 2004 – 2008

John Ratzenberger's Made in America is an American documentary television series hosted by John Ratzenberger. The series premiered January 6, 2004, on the Travel Channel. Ratzenberger visits various American manufacturers, taking the show's viewers along on the tours and showing how various everyday items are made. The show has visited a variety of factories, including Crayola, Airstream, Yankee Candle, Samuel Adams Brewery, Ruger, Delta Faucet Company, and Rodgers Instruments.

== Episodes ==
Year	Season	DVD	Ep #	Companies
2004	Season 1	1	1	Gibson Guitars, Annin Flag Company, SPAM
2004	Season 1	1	2	Harley Davidson, Gatorade
2004	Season 1	1	3	Monopoly, Louisville Slugger, Oscar Mayer Weiner
2004	Season 1	1	4	Airstream, Hartman
2004	Season 1	1	5	Campbells Soup, Crayola Factory
2004	Season 1	1	6	Barbasol, Welch's Grape Juice
2004	Season 1	2	7	Craftsman Tools, John Deere, Kellogg
2004	Season 1	2	8	Zippo, Jack Daniels, Howard Johnson Motor Lodge
2004	Season 1	2	9	Corvette, Burroughs Adding Machine
2004	Season 1	2	10	Sikorsky Helicopters, Lowell Boats, Radio Flyers
2004	Season 1	3	11	U.S. Mint, Goodyear Tire
2004	Season 1	3	12	Carousel Magic, Ivory Soap, KitchenAid
2004	Season 1	3	13	Fleer Trading Cards, Cannondale Lab, Wiffle Ball
2004	Season 1	3	14	Purity Diaries, Vermont Teddy Bear Company
2004	Season 1	3	15	Brooks Brothers, Stetson Cowboy Hats
2004	Season 1	4	16	Titleist, New Era Baseball Caps, Slinky
2004	Season 1	4	17	Longaberger Basket Company, Cape Cod Potato Chips
2004	Season 1	4	18	Steinway, Maple Landmark Woodcraft
2004	Season 1	4	19	Barre Granite, Mosser Glass
2004	Season 1	4	20	Remo Drums, Johnson Woolen Mills, Marx Toys
2005	Season 2		1	Yankee Candle, Better Packages, Wonder Bread
2005	Season 2		2	Pyrex, Wolf Coach Communications, Twinkie
2005	Season 2		3	US Steel, Stickley Furniture, Raytheon Microwave
2005	Season 2		4	GE Transportation, Globe Manufacturing, Martin Guitars
2005	Season 2		5	Tillamook Cheese, Derecktor Ferryboats, Knott's Berry Farm
2005	Season 2		6	Whitman's Chocolate, Segway Human Transporter, Stormy Kromer Mercantile
2005	Season 2		7	Pendleton Woolen Mills, Conn-Selmer Company, Steuben Crystal Workshop
2005	Season 2		8	Kohler, Hale Products, Commscope Company
2005	Season 2		9	Tootsie Roll, Rodgers Instruments, Highlights Magazine
2005	Season 2		10	Hallmark Cards, American Champion Aircraft, Delta Faucets
2005	Season 2		11	KitchenAid, Firefly Hot Air Balloons, Tabasco
2005	Season 2		12	Everlast, Betts Spring Company, WD-40
2005	Season 2		13	Burt's Bees, CUTCO, Zamboni
2005	Season 2		14	Vitalie Company, Boudin Bakery, Red Wing Work Boots
2005	Season 2		15	Panoz Esperante Convertible, Panavision, Ford Gumball Company
2005	Season 2		16	Hale Products, Fleetwood Motor Home, Duraflame
2005	Season 2		17	Serta, Powell Skateboards, Pepsi
2005	Season 2		18	Barbasol, Becker Surfboard, Delta Scientific Company
2006	Season 3		1	Caterpillar
2006	Season 3		2	3M
2006	Season 3		3	Diamond Matches
2006	Season 3		4	Bicycle Playing Cards, Sargent & Greenleaf, Coney Island
2006	Season 3		5	FB Washburn Candy Corp., Chemart Factory, Phoenix Decorating Company
2006	Season 3		6	Trek Bicycles, American Paper Optics Company
2006	Season 3		7	Tom's of Maine, Braille Books, Herman Miller Chair
2006	Season 3		8	In-Sink-Erator, The Squeegee
2006	Season 3		9	Bush-Whacker, Maker's Mark Distillery
2006	Season 3		10	Sam Adams, Deering Banjos, The Jeep
2006	Season 3		11	Hawaiian Tropic, Garrett Metal Detectors, Eli Bridge Company
2006	Season 3		12	Chris Craft Yachts, French Luggage, USA Today
2006	Season 3		13	E-One Fire Trucks, Silvercrest Western Homes, Rubbermaid
2006	Season 3		14	Alliance Rubber Bands, Pellican Cases, Benjamin Moore Paint
2006	Season 3		15	Mack Truck, Milgard Windows, Coca-Cola Headquarters
2006	Season 3		16	Wilson, Ansul Fire Estinguisher, American Ironhorse Motorcycle
2006	Season 3		17	Frye Boots, Jostens, Martinelli's
2006	Season 3		18	Budweiser, Nocona Sporting Goods, Tomorrowland
2006	Season 3		19	Fender Electric Guitars, M.L. Leddy's Western Saddles, Wheaties
2007	Season 4		1	Zildjian Cymbals, RGM Watches
2007	Season 4		2	Limonera Lemons, Starrett Precision Tools, Tums
2007	Season 4		3	Frito-Lay, Crane Paper, Steelcase Furniture
2007	Season 4		4	Merillat Cabinets, Art Research Enterprises, Columbus Washboard
2007	Season 4		5	QubicaAMF Bowling, Honeywell Fire Alarms, All American Hot Dog Carts
2007	Season 4		6	Gore-Tex, US Pole, Skee-Ball
2007	Season 4		7	All-Clad Cookware, Belden Brick Company, Necco Wafers
2007	Season 4		8	Aluminum Chair Co., Ball Aluminum Cans, Homer Laughlin China
2007	Season 4		9	Marble King Marbles, Dairy Queen Machines, Wigwam Socks
2007	Season 4		10	Sub-Zero Refrigerators, Astro-Physics, Tylenol
2007	Season 4		11	Stern Pinball, Ditch Witch Trenchers, American Whistle
2007	Season 4		12	Oscar Statuettes, Shawnee Mills Breads, Merle Norman Cosmetics
2007	Season 4		13	Roundhouse Overalls, Franklin Art Glass, Sebatini Winery
2007	Season 4		14	Fuller Brush, Robinson Helicopter, Morton Salt
2007	Season 4		15	Jacuzzi, Sand Trix, Dr. Pepper
2007	Season 4		16	Head-Penn Tennis Balls, WET Design Fountains, Starbucks
2007	Season 4		17	Rock-Ola Jukeboxes, Samson Ropes, Karastan Rugs and Carpets
2007	Season 4		18	Ping Golf Clubs
2007	Season 4		19	Filson Outdoor Apparel
2007	Season 4		20	Precore Exercise Equipment, Young Electric Sign, Texas Instruments
2008	Season 5		1	Hobie Cat, General Jackson Showboat
2008	Season 5		2	Shedd Aquarium, California Portland Cement
2008	Season 5		3	Viking Ranges, Sears Tower
2008	Season 5		4	French Quarter, United Record Pressing
2008	Season 5		5	Twin Span Bridge, Maytag Dishwashers, Channellock Tools
2008	Season 5		6	Chapman-Leonard Camera Dollies, Cathedral of Learning
2008	Season 5		7	Old State Capitol Building, Elgin Street Sweepers
2008	Season 5		8	Rock n Roll Hall of Fame, Wright Medical Orthepedics
2008	Season 5		9	Marathon Petroleum, Cape Hatteras Lighthouse
2008	Season 5		10	Fallingwater, Conn Denum
2008	Season 5		11	Chihuly Bridge of Glass, Hoist Liftruck
2008	Season 5		12	Space Needle, American Crescent Elevators
2008	Season 5		13	C. Cretors Popcorn Machines, Cleveland Arcade
2008	Season 5		14	Conservatory of Flowers, Gilbarco Veeder-Root Gas Pumps
2008	Season 5		15	Brown & Haley Almond Roca, PPG Place
2008	Season 5		16	Biltmore Estate, CMC Rescue Equipment
2008	Season 5		17	Griffith Park Observatory, TiLite Titanium Wheelchair
2008	Season 5		18	Thomas Built School Buses, Grand Coulee Dam
2008	Season 5		19	San Francisco Cable Car System, Dennis School Uniforms
2008	Season 5		20	Wild Horse Wind Farm, Bradbury and Bradbury Wallpaper
