= ACMP =

ACMP may refer to:

- Associated Chamber Music Players
- Association of Comics Magazine Publishers
- Aruba Certified Mobility Professional
- Advisory Committee for Malaria Prevention
- Association of Change Management Professionals
