= Ford Observatory (Ithaca) =

Observatory in New York state, US

Clinton B. Ford Observatory
- Organization: Ithaca College
- Observatory code: 845
- Location: Ithaca, New York (United States)
- Coordinates: 42°25′3.12″N 76°29′38.67″W
- Altitude: 348 m (1,142 ft)
- Established: 1998
- Website: Clinton B. Ford Observatory

Telescopes
- Unnamed Telescope: 40 cm (16") Fork-mounted f/8 Cassegrain reflector

The Clinton B. Ford Observatory is an astronomical observatory that is operated by the Ithaca College Department of Physics and Astronomy. The observatory is located in the forest on the south end of the Ithaca College campus in Ithaca, New York (United States). It is used by the college for astronomy classes and for research by physics faculty and students. It was constructed in 1998 using funds from the National Science Foundation, Ithaca College, and a bequest from the late Clinton B. Ford, with first light in September 1998. It houses a CCT-16 16-inch (0.4 m) f/8 Cassegrain telescope manufactured by DFM Engineering. Some electronics were repaired in 2018 through 2022 due to damage by rodents.

== Nearby observatories ==
- Fuertes Observatory, Cornell University, Ithaca, New York
- Hartung-Boothroyd Observatory, Cornell University, Ithaca, New York
- Kopernik Space Education Center, Vestal, New York

== See also ==
- List of astronomical observatories
- List of observatory codes
