= Hartung–Boothroyd Observatory =

Observatory in New York state, US

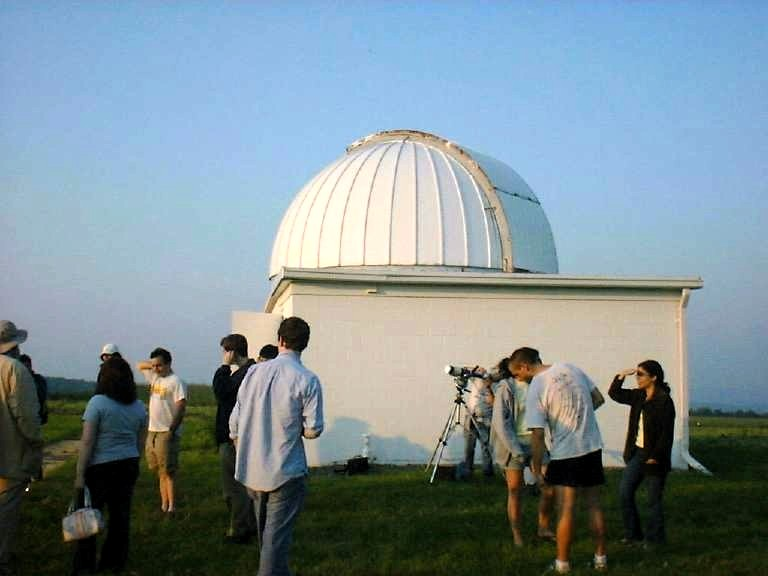
- Organization: Cornell University
- Observatory code: H81
- Location: 553 Mount Pleasant Rd; Dryden, New York (United States)
- Coordinates: 42°27′29.61″N 76°23′4.59″W
- Altitude: 530 m (1,740 ft)
- Established: 1974
- Website: hbo.sirtf.com

Telescopes
- James R. Houck Telescope: 60 cm (25") Fork-mounted Cassegrain reflector

The Hartung–Boothroyd Observatory (HBO) is located atop Mount Pleasant near Cornell University outside of Ithaca, New York (US). It is used mainly as a teaching facility for upper-level undergraduate astronomy classes. The observatory is named to recognize funding from M. John Hartung, a 1908 Cornell graduate and later chemical industrialist, and to honor Samuel L. Boothroyd, the founder of Cornell's Department of Astronomy. The facility was designed and directed from 1974 to 2012 by James R. Houck.

The primary 0.6m mirror was constructed from a Pyrex 1/8-scale test pouring as part of technology development for the Palomar Observatory 200-inch telescope. The mirror was polished and mounted in a lightweight tube in the late 1930s under Boothroyd's direction, but World War II deferred its planned use in a high-altitude observatory. This facility, together with an equatorial fork mount to hold the previously completed telescope, was completed in 1974.

== Nearby observatories ==
- Clinton B. Ford Observatory, Ithaca College
- Fuertes Observatory, Cornell University
- Kopernik Space Education Center

== See also ==
- List of observatories
