= Fuertes Observatory =

Observatory in New York state, US

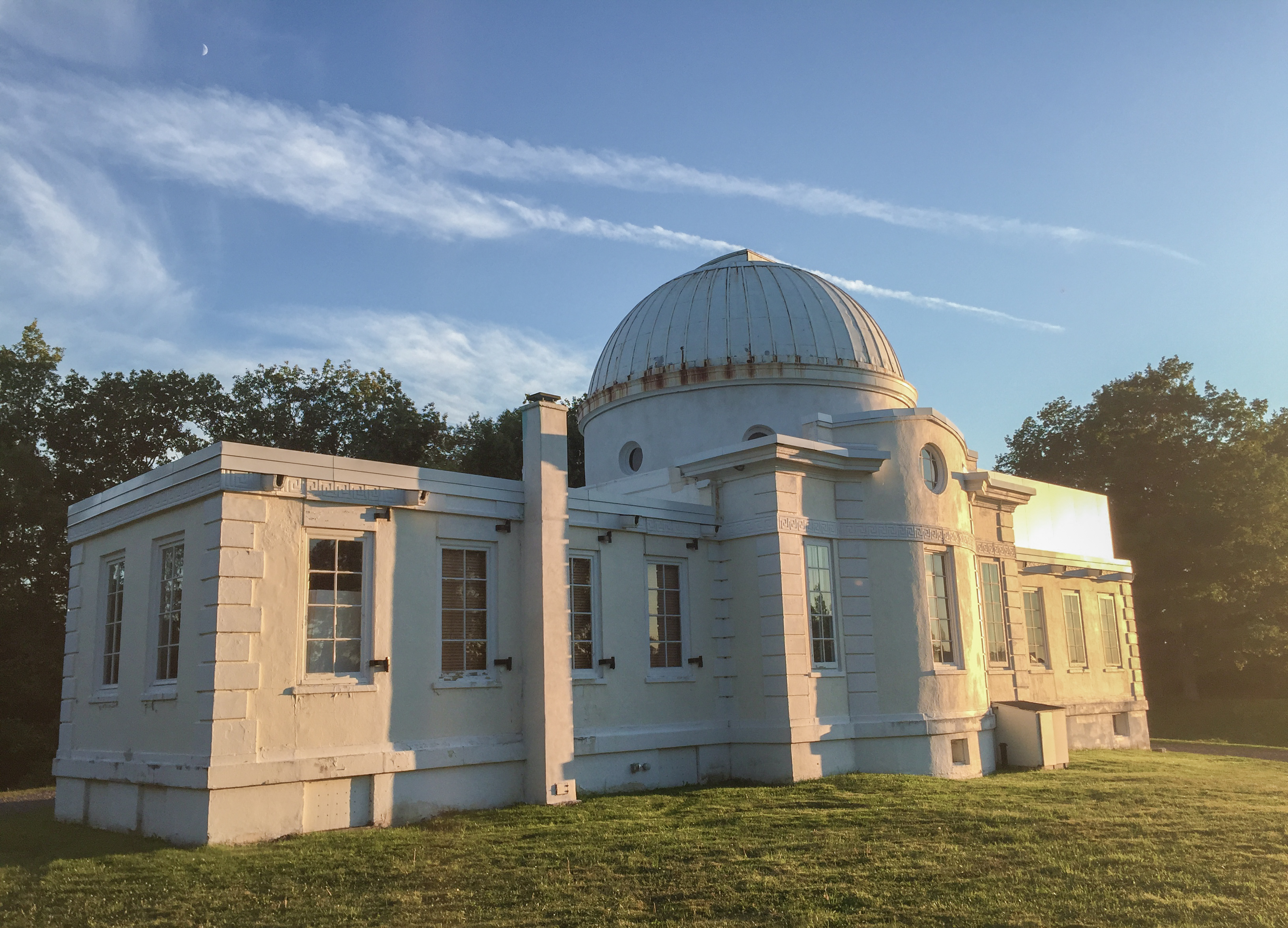
- Named after: Estevan Antonio Fuertes
- Organization: Cornell University
- Location: Ithaca, New York (United States)
- Coordinates: 42°27′10″N 76°28′28.16″W
- Altitude: 274 m (899 ft)
- Established: 1917
- Website: Fuertes Website
- Architect: L.P. Burnham, Cornell Professor of Architecture

Telescopes
- Irving Porter Church Memorial Telescope: 30 cm (12") Brashear refractor on Warner & Swasey mount.
- Obsession 15": 38 cm (15") Obsession Newtonian reflector on Dobsonian altazimuth mount
- Celestron C-14: 35 cm (14") Schmidt-Cassegrain reflector on equatorial fork mount
- Meade LX200: 30 cm (12") Schmidt-Cassegrain reflector on tripod.
- Related media on Commons

Fuertes Observatory is an astronomical observatory located on the North Campus of Cornell University in Ithaca, New York. The observatory was designed by L.P. Burnham, Cornell Professor of Architecture and completed in fall of 1917. It was originally used by the Civil Engineering Department as an instructional field office for navigation and surveying. Today, the observatory is primarily used for public outreach, welcoming over two thousand visitors per year with open houses on every Friday night during the academic year.

The facility is currently maintained by the Cornell Department of Astronomy, though open houses are routinely managed by the Cornell Astronomical Society, a group of Cornell undergraduate and graduate students. The observatory is named after the Puerto Rican-American astronomer and builder of Cornell's first observatory, Estevan Antonio Fuertes.

== History ==
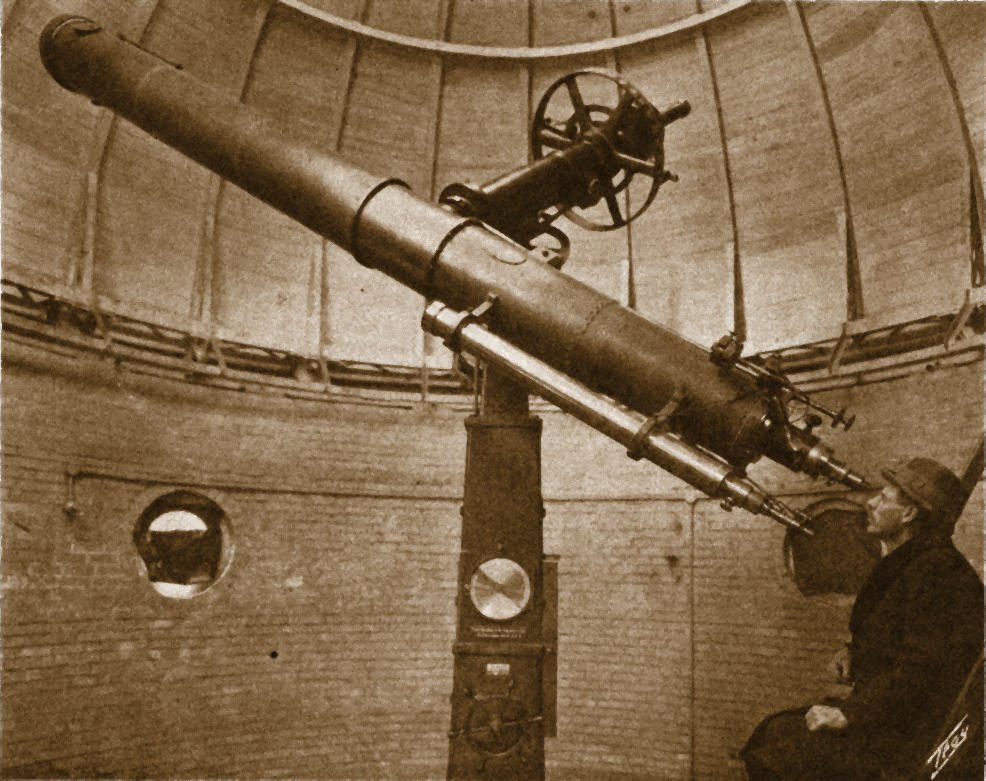
Professor Samuel L. Boothroyd looks through the Irving Porter Church Telescope in 1923, soon after its completion. Cornell Alumni News, May 3, 1923.

Several observatories existed on Cornell's Central Campus in the later part of the 19th century and first decade of the 20th century. However, due to the development of the campus and the need to build a drill hall (Barton Hall), the predecessors to Fuertes were demolished, and plans were made to build a new observatory on the undeveloped North Campus. In 1916, construction of the Fuertes Observatory began under the supervision of the Cornell Department of Civil Engineering. The building was completed in Fall of 1917 with a 24-foot-diameter steel dome; 30-foot-long I-beams were incorporated to provide support for a future telescope. This differed from the typical masonry pier used to support a telescope in most observatories.

The first telescope in the dome room of Fuertes was a 4.5-inch refractor telescope used in some of Cornell's previous observatories, and was mounted on an equatorial clock-driven mount. Soon after, in 1919, Civil Engineering Professor Irving Porter Church acquired two glass blanks from the Yerkes Observatory in Wisconsin. The glass blanks were ground and polished into a 12-inch achromatic lens by Brashear & Co in 1920. Professor Church spearheaded a campaign to raise money from civil engineering alumni to build the telescope and equatorial mounting. In January 1922, the order was placed with the Warner & Swasey Company to build the equatorial mount. After modifications were made to the original dome, the telescope was installed during the summer and fall of 1922, and was completed on October 16, 1922. It was officially dedicated on June 15, 1923 as the “Irving Porter Church Memorial Telescope.”

Additionally, the observatory was built with a classroom, transit room (with a clamshell roof), and an office. A large backlit display case containing numerous astronomical slides was featured (and remains today) in the lobby of the building. Many civil engineering instruments were housed in Fuertes, including zenith telescopes, theodolites, sextants, transit instruments, and a chronograph. The transit room has since been converted into a museum to display many of the historic instruments.

== Telescopes ==
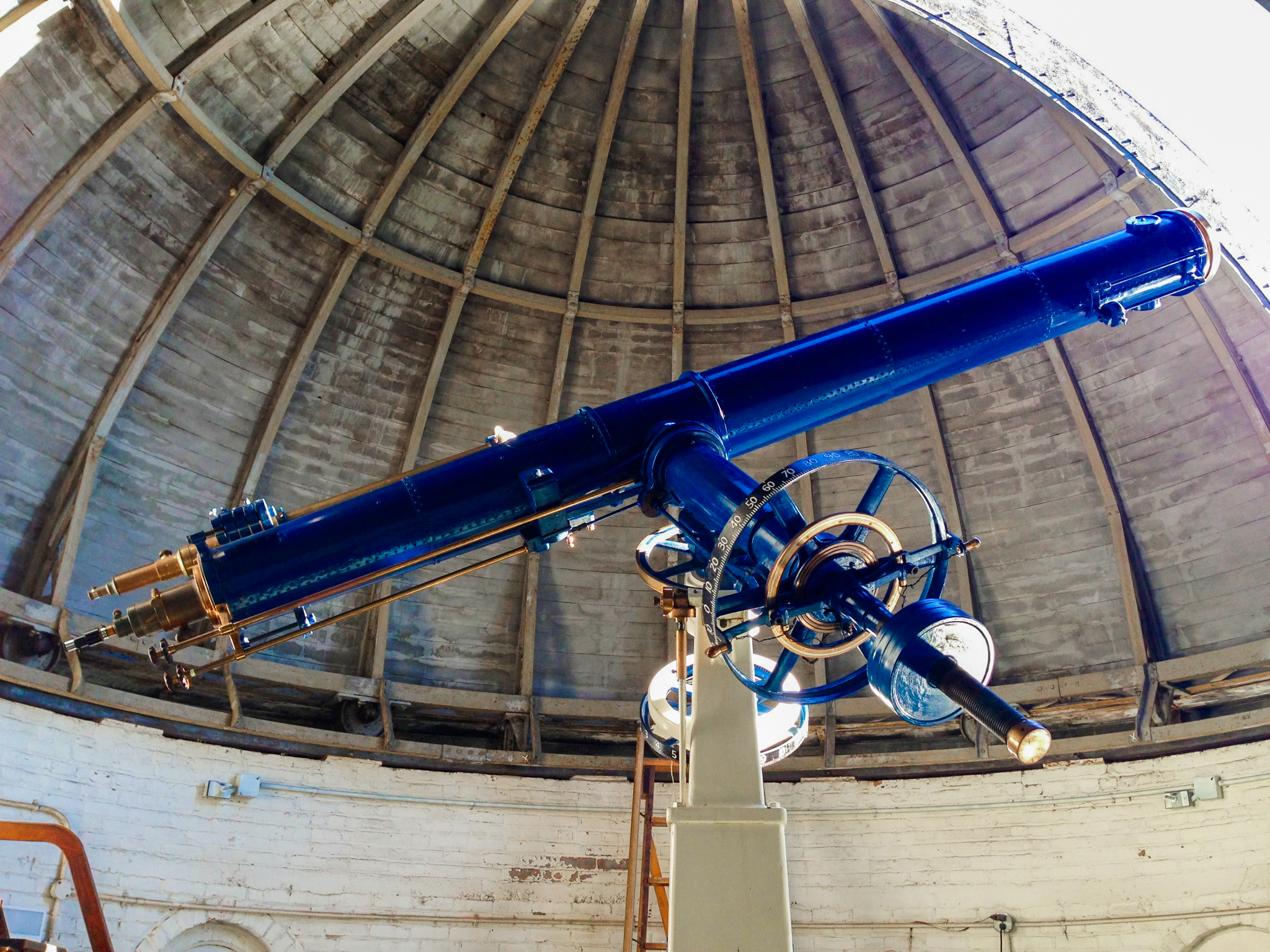
The Irving Porter Church Memorial Telescope residing in the dome room of Cornell's Fuertes Observatory. The instrument is a 12" f/15 refracting telescope installed in 1922.

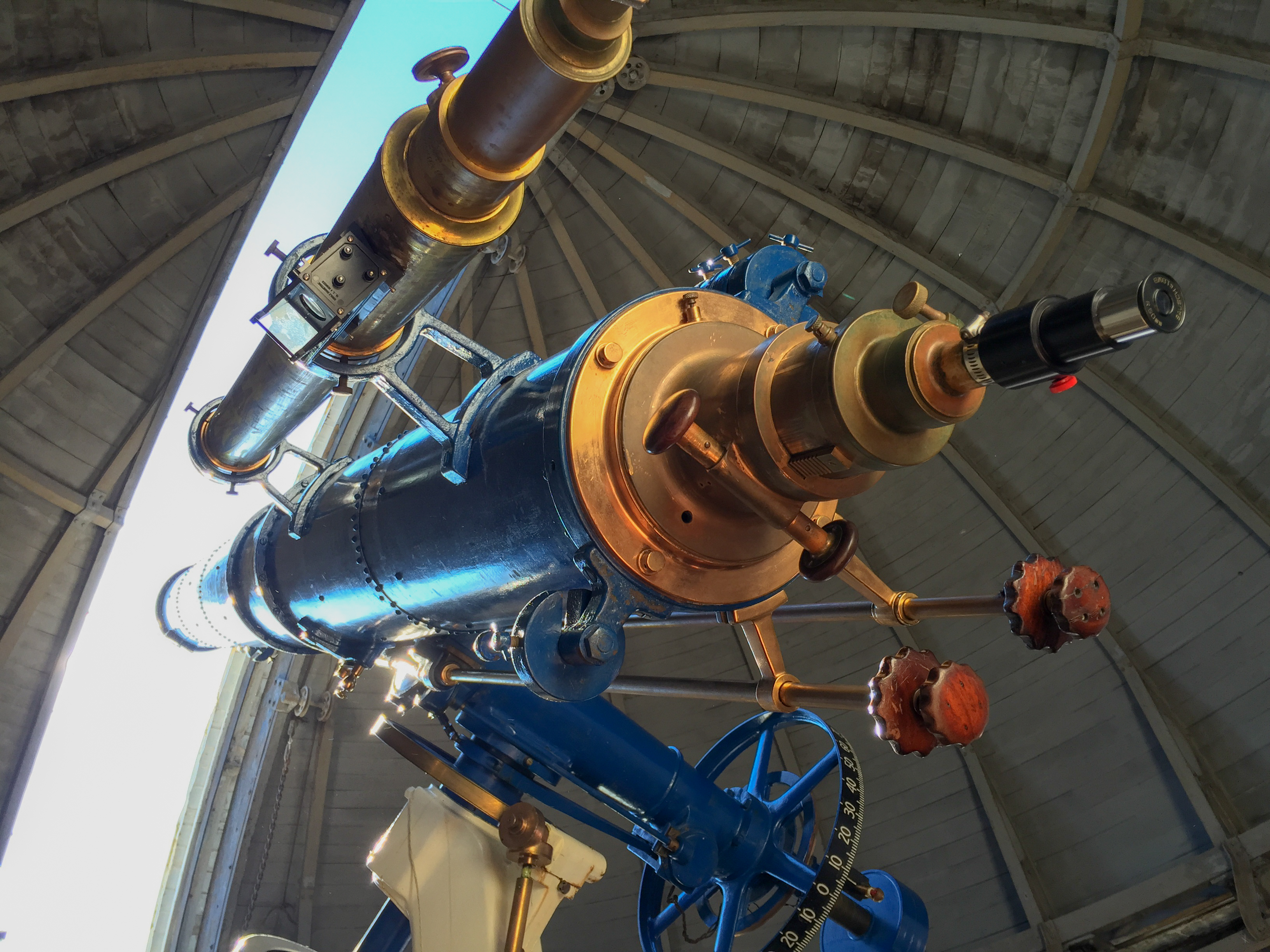
The Irving Porter Church Telescope on its original German Equatorial Mount built by Warner & Swasey.

The observatory contains a 12-inch refracting telescope with a weight-driven mechanical clock drive. The original glass blanks that were to become the optics were procured in 1919 by Prof. Irving P. Church, head of the Cornell Department of Civil Engineering; the two-element lens was ground and polished by the well-known firm of Brashear & Co. and delivered to Cornell in 1920. In January 1922, a contract was given to the Warner and Swasey Co. of Cleveland, Ohio to build the mount. On October 16, 1922, the telescope was erected upon its German equatorial mount in the central dome of the Fuertes Observatory. The observatory's original 4.5-inch telescope was mounted onto the 12-inch refractor, and currently serves as the finder scope.

The observatory also contains several transit telescopes, zenith scopes, and other antique astronomical instruments used by Civil Engineers in the late 19th and early 20th centuries for geodesy and timekeeping. These instruments are on display in a museum that occupies the east wing of the building.

== Public access ==
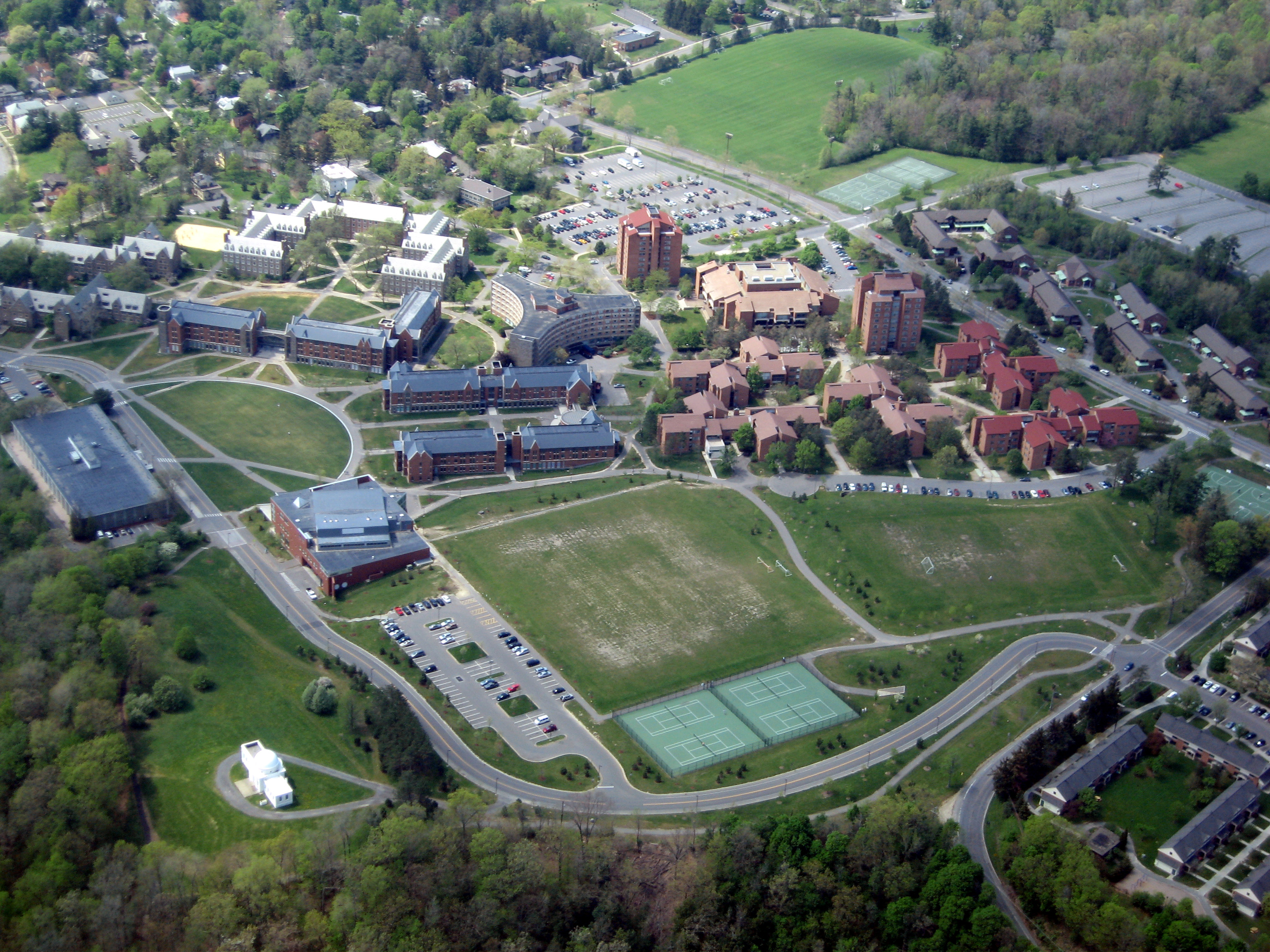
North Campus with Fuertes Observatory in the lower left of the picture

Fuertes is open to Cornell students and the general public every Friday night, hosted by the Cornell Astronomical Society. When clear, observing will take place from 8 PM until midnight. Tours of the observatory and its historic telescopes will be given regardless of the weather. During the academic year, a lecture or astronomy-related documentary is often presented before observing.

== Nearby observatories ==
- Clinton B. Ford Observatory, Ithaca College, Ithaca, New York
- Hartung-Boothroyd Observatory, Cornell University, Ithaca, New York
- Kopernik Space Education Center, Vestal, New York

== See also ==
- List of astronomical observatories
- List of largest optical refracting telescopes
