= The Startup Ladies =

American startup company

- Type: Private
- Industry: Education
- Founded: 2014
- Founder: Kristen Cooper (CEO & Founder)
- Headquarters: Carmel, Indiana
- Website: www.thestartupladies.org

The Startup Ladies is an Indiana-based membership organization focused on supporting women entrepreneurs and investors. Founded in 2014 by Kristen Cooper, the organization works to increase the number of women starting scalable businesses and to address investment disparities faced by women entrepreneurs.

== Overview ==
The Startup Ladies is a for-profit organization that provides resources, educational programs, and networking opportunities for women entrepreneurs, investors, and corporate executives. It provides mentorship and hosts networking events designed to address the funding and support gaps between women founders and their male counterparts.

The mission of The Startup Ladies is "to identify, educate, connect, and increase investment in women starting up scalable businesses." The organization emphasizes fostering an inclusive startup community and works to address gender and racial disparities within the startup ecosystem. This includes engaging with state policies that impact the startup ecosystem, particularly those affecting women and the LGBTQ+ community.

In outlining the work of The Startup Ladies, Julie Warnecke, founder of Found Search Marketing, has highlighted the challenges faced by women entrepreneurs as follows: “Women-owned businesses represent 42% of all U.S. businesses, but they only receive 2.3% of venture capital. Women of color and LGBTQ+ women founders secure even less. The Startup Ladies are leading the charge in the Midwest to help more women launch scalable businesses and secure funding to grow.”

The Startup Ladies provides memberships for three primary user categories: entrepreneurs, investors, and corporations. Each level provides tailored in-person and virtual training sessions and resources to meet specific member needs. It also offers membership options for students and remote participants.

=== Advisory Board and Ambassadors ===
The Startup Ladies has an external Advisory Board that supports the organization in executing its strategies and facilitating growth. Board members act as advocates for the organization's mission, participate in events, assist with fundraising, and connect members with potential advisors, clients, and investors. Board members include John Dartt, City Council Member for District 1 in Westfield, Indiana; Jon Gilman, Director of Power Platform Enterprise Solutions at Microsoft; Anita Williams, co-Chair of Board for the Indianapolis Black Chamber of Commerce; and Dr. Mindy Weinstein, CEO of Market MindShift.

In addition to the Advisory Board, The Startup Ladies also has a group of Ambassadors, who help facilitate events, serve as representatives for the organization, and amplify the work of the organization.

== History ==
The "Launch Ladies" began in 2014 as a monthly meetup in Indianapolis, Indiana, initiated by Kristen Cooper. It changed its name to the Startup Ladies in 2015, and in 2017, the organization transitioned to a paid membership model. Since then, The Startup Ladies has expanded its programming and services, reaching members throughout the Midwest.

Since its founding, the organization has emphasized its social mission and has been recognized for its contributions to the community. In 2018, The Startup Ladies founder, Kristen Cooper, received the "Community Champion of the Year" at the Mira Awards, hosted by TechPoint, based in Indianapolis.

Over its ten-year history, The Startup Ladies has been recognized by multiple organizations in Indianapolis for its contributions to the startup ecosystem and to the growth of women-owned businesses. The organization has supported hundreds of women founders, helped them raise rounds of funding, and provided them with opportunities to connect with potential investors. Its membership and sponsors have grown to include a community of entrepreneurs, investors, enterprise companies, universities, and co-working spaces. It celebrated its anniversary in August 2024 by honoring "Female Founders and Allies" at Found Search Marketing HQ in Fishers.

== Work and Initiatives ==
=== Educational Programs ===
The Startup Ladies offers a range of educational programs aimed at helping women enhance their entrepreneurial skills:

- Startup Study Hall: A series of workshops covering business fundamentals, strategic planning, and scaling techniques.
- Mental Wellness for Entrepreneurs: Focused on the psychological challenges of entrepreneurship, this series provides tools for managing stress and promoting well-being.
- Startup Investing 101: Training sessions for individuals interested in investing in startups, with a focus on understanding investment strategies and assessing investment opportunities in women-owned businesses.

The organization also provides 1:1 Mentoring through weekly office hours.

=== eLearning Platform ===
The Startup Ladies provides a members-only eLearning platform called Startup Study Hall Online, offering 24/7 access to educational resources for women entrepreneurs and investors. The platform includes modules on startup strategies, scaling, and investment readiness, with interactive lessons and guidance from executive mentors. It supports a self-paced learning approach to accommodate the schedules of busy entrepreneurs.

=== Annual Summit ===
Since 2023, The Startup Ladies has held an annual #InvestInWomenFounders Summit, hosted at the Delta Faucet Company headquarters in Indianapolis. As the organization's flagship event, the summit brings together women entrepreneurs, investors, and corporate leaders to discuss opportunities and strategies for scaling women-led businesses.

A key feature of the event is a pitch session, described by the organization as "Oprah-style," in which 8-9 founders present their businesses alongside a seasoned entrepreneur or senior executive. The entrepreneurs or senior executives mentor the founders in the months leading up to the summit. At the event, they interview the founders in a relaxed, in-depth conversation that allows founders to showcase their businesses while connecting with the audience. The interviewers' role is to champion the founders, encouraging the audience to consider how they can assist with securing investment and client connections.

=== Project Boardup ===
In 2024, The Startup Ladies teamed up with the Indianapolis Black Chamber of Commerce and the Indiana Rainbow Chamber to create "Project Boardup." With funding provided by the Indiana Economic Development Corporation, the initiative aims to bridge the gap between experienced executives and underrepresented startup founders by identifying, training, and onboarding executives to serve as advisory board members. As part of the program, entrepreneurs will be identified and trained on how to select and manage their advisory board members effectively. After training, the program will match advisors with businesses owned by women, Black, and LGBTQ+ founders.

== Partnerships and Sponsorships ==
The Startup Ladies collaborates with local and national businesses to secure sponsorships that support their programming. Notable partnerships include Delta Faucet Company and Found Search Marketing, LLC, which have provided support for both events and mentorship programs.

== Leadership ==
Kristen Cooper, the CEO and founder of The Startup Ladies, has played a central role in shaping the organization’s mission and growth. Her background in business development and commitment to supporting women-led startups have guided the direction of the organization. She has been recognized for her efforts to advocate for women in the tech and startup space by numerous organizations:

- Cooper was named one of Indianapolis Business Journal's "Women of Influence" in 2016 for her work as founder of The Startup Ladies and Vice President of Operations and Corporate Development at Sticknsleaves.
- In 2018, Techpoint named Cooper the "Community Champion of the Year."
- The Indiana Historical Society named her as an “Outstanding Woman of Inspiration” in 2020.
- She received the Indy Hackers Community Member of the Year Award in 2020.
- The Indianapolis Chapter of the National Association of Women Business Owners (NAWBO) recognized her as "Woman Business Owner of the Year" in 2021.
- The Indy Black Chamber of Commerce recognized her with the Friend of the Indy Black Chamber of Commerce Award in 2021.
- The Indy Rainbow Chamber of Commerce bestowed its Excellence in Business Award in 2023.

Cooper is a regular writer for the Indianapolis Business Journal, offering columns focused on women and equity in the startup space.

== See also ==
- Women’s entrepreneurship
- Startup ecosystem
- Venture capital
