= Thijs de Graauw =

Dutch astronomer (1942–2026)

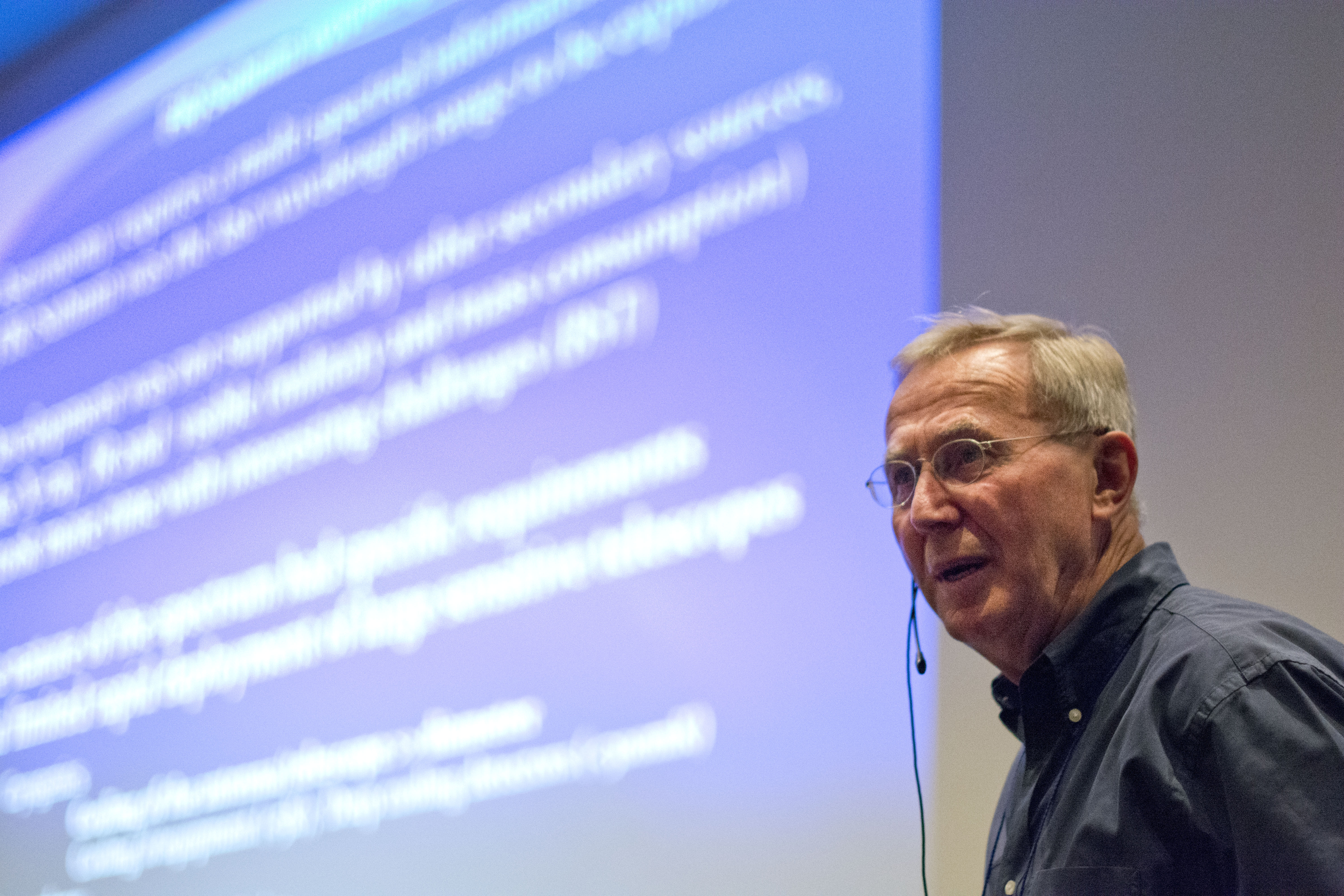
- De Graauw in 2013
- Born: Mattheus Wilhelmus Maria de Graauw; 10 March 1942; Kerkdriel, German-occupied Netherlands
- Died: 20 April 2026 (aged 84); Santiago, Chile
- Education: Utrecht University
- Occupation: Astronomer
- Awards: Joseph Weber Award
- Honours: American Astronomical Society Legacy Fellow

Mattheus Wilhelmus Maria "Thijs" de Graauw (10 March 1942 – 20 April 2026) was a Dutch astronomer.

== Life and career ==
Thijs de Graauw was born in Kerkdriel, Netherlands on 10 March 1942. He studied astronomy at Utrecht University and received there his Ph.D. in 1975 under Henk van Bueren with a dissertation on 'Infrared Heterodyne Detection in Astronomy : Experiments and Observations'. From 1975 to 1983 he worked as a scientist for the Space Science Department of ESA (European Space Agency). At ESA's largest facility, ESTEC in Noordwijk, he worked on the development of microwave receivers. In 1983 he became the director of the Groningen branch of SRON (Stichting Ruimte Onderzoek Nederland). From 2008 to 2013 he was the director of the Atacama Large Millimeter/submillimeter Array (ALMA).

In 2012 he won the Joseph Weber Award for his work on the short wavelength spectrometer on the Infrared Space Observatory and also for his work on the HIFI camera, which was launched on board Herschel, ESA's infrared space observatory.

He was elected a Legacy Fellow of the American Astronomical Society in 2020.

Asteroid (11243) de Graauw was named after him.

De Graauw died on 20 April 2026, at the age of 84 in Santiago, Chile.
