= James R. Houck =

- Born: October 5, 1940; Mobile, Alabama, US
- Died: September 18, 2015 (aged 74); Ithaca, New York, US
- Education: Carnegie-Mellon University, Cornell University
- Occupations: professor, lecturer
- Known for: Key contributions to the Infrared Astronomical Satellite (IRAS) and Spitzer Space Telescope missions
- Awards: NASA Exceptional Scientific Achievement Medal (1984, 2005); Joseph Weber Award for Astronomical Instrumentation (2008)
- Scientific career
- Fields: Astrophysics
- Workplaces: Cornell University

James Richard Houck (October 5, 1940 – September 18, 2015) was the Kenneth A. Wallace Professor of Astronomy at Cornell University.

Houck pioneered infrared observational astronomy, designing detectors and spectrographs that were flown on sounding rockets in the 1960s, on airborne observatories in the 1970s, and the Infrared Astronomical Satellite (IRAS) in 1984 and the Spitzer Space Telescope in 2003. He also led development of Cornell's instrumentation for the Palomar Observatory Hale Telescope.

Houck's research outside instrumentation has focused on the mechanisms responsible for energy generation in Ultraluminous Infrared Galaxies (ULIRGs), of which he was a discoverer using the IRAS satellite. Houck has also studied the formation of dust in the early Universe.

Houck was a member of the Cornell University Senate and served as the designer and founding director of the Hartung–Boothroyd Observatory.

He was married to Elaine Vezzani, with whom he had two children, until her death in 2011.

== Honors ==
- NASA Exceptional Scientific Achievement Medal (1984) "for outstanding contributions to IRAS, including efforts in the rebuilding of the telescope focal plane assembly and continuing scientific analysis."
- NASA Exceptional Scientific Achievement Medal (2005) "for his work on the Spitzer Space Telescope infrared spectrograph."
- Joseph Weber Award for Astronomical Instrumentation (2008) "for his extraordinary contributions over nearly four decades to major instrumentation for infrared astronomy."
