= Behr (paint) =

North American paint company

Behr Paint Company
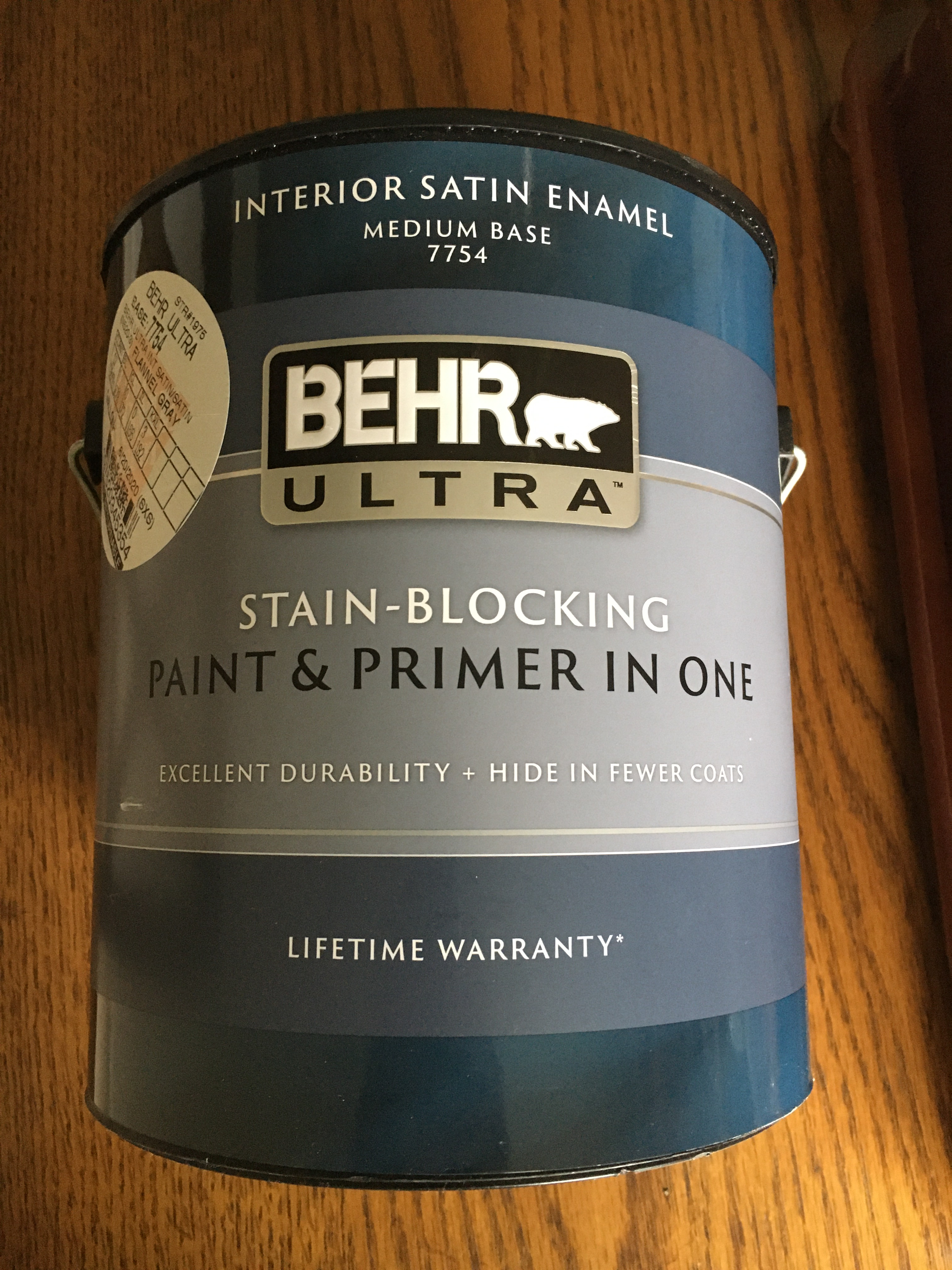
- Plastic bucket of Behr paint
- Founded: 1947
- Founder: Otho Behr, Jr.
- Headquarters: 1801 E. Saint Andrews Place; Santa Ana, California 92705; U.S.
- Products: Paint, Epoxy Paint
- Parent: Masco
- Website: www.behr.com

Behr Paint Company (stylized as BEHR) is a supplier of architectural paint and exterior wood care products to the American and Canadian do it yourself markets. Behr manufactures interior and exterior house paints, decorative finishes, primers, stains and surface preparation products sold exclusively at The Home Depot. Behr provides painters a large array of colors, each with a creative name to help remember the color in the future.

Behr was founded in 1947 when Otho Behr, Jr. (1914-2007) sold linseed oil wood stains to paint stores from the back of his station wagon. Behr approached his father, a chemist, to develop a formula for a redwood stain. The resulting growth of the business led Behr to move the company's operations to an 800 square foot Quonset hut in Pasadena, California in 1948. The business outgrew this facility as well, and in the early 1950s Behr relocated the company to its current home in Santa Ana, California. Behr has grown as the home resale market created greater demand for paints, lighting, wallpaper and other goods.

In 1988, Behr offered computer color matching, allowing customers to bring pieces of fabric or other color samples to The Home Depot to be scanned by a color matching machine and be turned into a color formula for paint.

In 1999, Behr was purchased by Masco Corporation.
