= Clinton B. Ford =

American investor and musician

Clinton Banker Ford (March 1, 1913 – September 23, 1992) was an American investor, musician and amateur astronomer specializing in the observation of variable stars.

Clinton B. Ford

== Birth and family ==
Clinton Banker Ford, born on March 1, 1913, in Ann Arbor, Michigan, was the son of Walter and Edith (Banker) Ford. Ford had one brother, Sylvester Ford (1906–1956). The Ford side of the family hailed from Oneonta, New York where it survived until the 1930s. Ford's mother's family came from Ovid, New York.

Ford's father, Walter, was a mathematics professor at the University of Michigan at Ann Arbor. Ford's first brush with the stars came in August 1927 when he went with his father to Boulder, CO to a meeting of the AMA. It was at this point in his life that Ford first saw the splendor the sky could show.

== First brush with the stars ==
In the Spring of 1927 Professor Ralph Curtiss loaned Ford two books: Splendour of the Heavens and The Friendly Stars. In the back of the latter book's original edition there was an invitation by William Tyler Olcott of the AAVSO to contribute to the advancement of astronomy by observing variable stars. Ford took Olcott and the AAVSO up on that invitation and on September 23, 1927, he reported his first variable star estimate - 184205 R Scuti at 5.3 magnitude.

Ford made over 60,000 variable star observations and became the youngest member of the American Association of Variable Star Observers at the age of fifteen.

== The voyage to Europe ==
Ford, by virtue of a sabbatical his father took, was lucky enough to tour Europe, the Middle East, and Egypt when he was fifteen. Ford spent his sixteenth birthday in Alexandretta. Among several adventures Ford had at the time, one included climbing to the top of the Great Pyramid and carving his name into it.

Ford also visited several observatories, astronomers, and museums. He used the 6" refractor at the University of Leiden, for example, to make 36 variable star estimates for the AAVSO at this time. Later he visited American astronomer George W. Ritchey then on staff at the Observatoire de Paris where Ritchey told Ford all about his wish to create the 300" Apalantic Supertelescope. We now know this general design today as the Ritchey-Chrétien telescope. Ford also attended a meeting of the Société Astronomique de France while in Paris.

Ford's astronomical adventures in Europe were brought to a conclusion when he visited Greenwich Observatory and stood, on May 31, "right below the transit slit, with one foot at 23h 59m 59.999s and the other one at 00h 00m 00.001s."

== High school and college ==
Upon returning from Europe, and as he finished high school, Ford found himself working for the aging Professor Edwin B. Frost at Yerkes Observatory, partially on the strength of an article he'd written for Popular Astronomy magazine. While at Yerkes he managed to do some variable star observing with some of the smaller telescopes, trace copies of the AAVSO charts that were in the Yerkes files, and learn about developing astronomical plates.

College saw Ford at the University of Michigan. Here he nearly decided to major in English and waited until his sophomore year to take his first astronomy course. In August and September 1932 Ford traveled to Maine to view the total solar eclipse on August 31. In the spring of 1933 Ford resolved to "return to science" with regard to his studies. A year later he gained Professor Heber D. Curtis, famous for his part in the Shapley-Curtis Debate on the nature of the galaxy, as his advisor.

== Post-college ==
He served in the US Navy in World War II. Later in life, he played violin with the Stamford Symphony Orchestra of Stamford, Connecticut.

He became a member of the Ithaca College Board of Trustees in 1966 and was awarded honorary status in 1988. The college has named its observatory in his honor.

He was famous in amateur astronomical circles for his quote: "Never sleep more than 90 feet from your telescope." In 1987 he won the Amateur Achievement Award of the Astronomical Society of the Pacific.

The headquarters of the AAVSO in Cambridge, Massachusetts, is named the Clinton B. Ford Astronomical Data and Research Center.

When he died, aged 79, he bequeathed a substantial endowment to the AAVSO, which continues to serve as its primary source of operating income.

== Ford Observatories ==
The AAVSO previously owned the Ford Observatory named in his honor in southern California, near Wrightwood (Observatory Code 674); it was donated to the Los Angeles Astronomical Society (LAAS) in 2012. Ithaca College in New York owns another observatory of the same name, Ford Observatory, named in his honor in 1998 (Observatory Code 845); it was previously known as Ithaca College Observatory.

== Amateur music ==
Ford was an avid amateur violinist and chamber music player. He carried his violin with him on travels and in every location sought out local players to join him in string quartet sessions. He was one of the leading amateur musicians in the Associated Chamber Music Players (ACMP), an organization that encourages amateur chamber music and publishes an international directory of chamber music players. On his death, he bequeathed 6 million dollars to ACMP to establish a fund to advance chamber music education.

== See also ==
- List of observatory codes
- Associated Chamber Music Players

== Bibliography ==
- AAVSO, Some Stars, Some Music: The Memoirs of Clinton B. Ford, AAVSO, 1986.

Preceded by Jean Meeus	Amateur Achievement Award of Astronomical Society of the Pacific; 1987	Succeeded by Jack B. Newton
