= Shouleh Nikzad =

Iranian-American electronic engineer

- Born: Tehran
- Education: California Institute of Technology; University of Southern California
- Scientific career
- Workplaces: California Institute of Technology; Jet Propulsion Laboratory

Shouleh Nikzad is an Iranian-American electronic engineer and research scientist at the Jet Propulsion Laboratory. She leads the Advanced Detector Arrays, Systems, and Nanoscience Group. Her research considers ultraviolet and low-energy particle detectors, nanostructure devices and novel spectrometers. Nikzad is a Fellow of the American Physical Society, the National Academy of Inventors and SPIE.

== Early life and education ==
As an undergraduate, Nikzad majored in electronic engineering at the University of Southern California. She moved to California Institute of Technology for graduate studies, where she earned her Ph.D. in 1983. Nikzad investigated compound materials (including zinc sulfide and cadmium sulfide) that had been produced through ion beam sputtering using laser spectroscopy.

== Research and career ==
Nikzad was appointed an electro-optics engineer at Pacific Infrared. She moved to the Argonne National Laboratory as a graduate fellow in 1998, before joining California Institute of Technology as a postdoctoral fellow in 1990. After two years at Caltech, Nikzad moved to Jet Propulsion Laboratory (JPL), where she focused on imaging and detector systems. At the JPL, Nikzad designed curved imaging systems, which, inspired by the human eye, can support high quality imaging in large telescopes.

As of 2019, Nikzad is a senior research scientist and principal engineer at JPL where she leads the Advanced Detector Arrays, Systems, and Nanoscience Group.

== Awards and honors ==
- 1997 Lew Allen Award of Excellence
- 2011 IEEE Pioneer Electrical Engineer
- 2012 Elected Fellow of the American Physical Society
- 2013 SPIE Women in Optics Planner
- 2017 Elected Fellow of the National Academy of Inventors
- 2019 Institute of Electrical and Electronics Engineers Photonics Distinguished Lecturer
- 2020 NASA Outstanding Leadership Medal
- 2021 SPIE Aden and Marjorie Meinel Technology Achievement Award
- 2023 Joseph Weber Award for Astronomical Instrumentation
- 2023 Elected Fellow of Optica for leadership and sustained, high-impact contributions to the field of ultraviolet/visible photonic detection.

== Selected publications ==
- Shouleh Nikzad; Michael E Hoenk; Frank Greer; et al. (1 January 2012). "Delta-doped electron-multiplied CCD with absolute quantum efficiency over 50% in the near to far ultraviolet range for single photon counting applications". Applied Optics. 51 (3): 365–369. arXiv:1102.2244. doi:10.1364/ao.51.000365. ISSN 1559-128X. PMID 22270664. Wikidata Q37978169.
- John Hennessy; April D Jewell; Michael E Hoenk; Shouleh Nikzad (1 April 2015). "Metal-dielectric filters for solar-blind silicon ultraviolet detectors". Applied Optics. 54 (11): 3507–3512. doi:10.1364/ao.54.003507. ISSN 1559-128X. PMID 25967344. Wikidata Q87295469.
- Gillian Kyne; Erika T. Hamden; Nicole Lingner; Patrick Morrissey; Shouleh Nikzad; D. Christopher Martin (5 August 2016). "The faint intergalactic-medium red-shifted emission balloon: future UV observations with EMCCDs". Proceedings of SPIE. doi:10.1117/12.2232879. ISSN 0277-786X. Wikidata Q58470022.
