= Joseph Weber Award for Astronomical Instrumentation =

The Joseph Weber Award for Astronomical Instrumentation is awarded by the American Astronomical Society to an individual for the design, invention or significant improvement of instrumentation leading to advances in astronomy. It is named after physicist Joseph Weber. The awards tend to be for a career of instrument development rather than a single specific device; the lists of inventions below are taken from press releases from the recipients' institutions.

== Weber Award winners ==
Source: American Astronomical Society

Year	Recipient	Inventions
2002	James E. Gunn	CCDs in astronomy: WFPC on Hubble, Sloan Digital Sky Survey, ...
2003	Frank J. Low	IR detection by bolometer arrays
2004	Thomas G. Phillips	Sub-millimetre and terahertz instrumentation
2005	Stephen Shectman	Active optics
2006	Roger Angel	Adaptive optics for infra-red spectroscopy
2007	Harvey Moseley	Microshutter arrays, X-ray microcalorimeter
2008	James R. Houck	Spectrographs for infrared astronomy
2009	Peter Serlemitsos	X-ray detector and telescope designs
2010	Donald N. B. Hall	Low noise detectors for observational infrared astronomy
2011	Edward S. Cheng	Several key instruments on the Hubble Space Telescope
2012	Thijs de Graauw	Short Wavelength Spectrometer on ISO and the Heterodyne Instrument For the Infrared on Herschel
2013	Keith Matthews	Infrared astronomical instrumentation
2014	Sander Weinreb	Digital auto-correlation spectrometers and cryogenic low-noise amplifiers and mixers
2015	Claire E. Max	Adaptive optics with sodium laser guide stars
2016	James J. (Jamie) Bock	Low noise “spider web” bolometers
2017	Ian S. McLean	Infrared sensor arrays
2018	Rainer Weiss	Interferometric gravitational wave detector
2019	John D. Monnier	
2020	Oswald O. Siegmund	
2021	—N/a	—N/a
2022	Michael Lesser	
2022	Peter Wizinowich	
2023	Shouleh Nikzad	
2024	Paul Goldsmith	
2025	James Green	
2026	Constance Rockosi	

== See also ==
- List of astronomy awards

== External link ==
- Joseph Weber Award
