= Heartland Industrial Partners =

American private equity firm focused on industry consolidation

- Type: Private
- Industry: Private equity
- Founded: 1999; 27 years ago
- Founder: David Stockman, Timothy D. Leuliette, Daniel P. Tredwell
- Defunct: 2013
- Fate: closed
- Headquarters: Stamford, Connecticut, United States
- Products: Leveraged buyout, Growth capital

Heartland Industrial Partners was a private equity firm founded in 1999 focused on industry consolidation and growth capital investments in middle-market industrial companies.

The firm, which was based in Stamford, Connecticut, terminated its registration with the SEC in 2013.

== History ==
The firm was founded in 1999 by former Reagan budget director David Stockman, Timothy Leuliette and Daniel Tredwell In 2001, the firm completed fundraising for its first and only private equity fund with approximately $1.4 billion of investor commitments.

=== Collins & Aikman ===
In 2005, it was reported that Stockman handed control of the fund, Heartland Industrial Partners, over to his partners following his resignation as chairman of Collins & Aikman, which was a major investment for the fund that ended in bankruptcy.

On March 26, 2007, federal prosecutors in Manhattan indicted Stockman in "a scheme ... to defraud Collins & Aikman's investors, banks and creditors by manipulating C&A's reported revenues and earnings." At the same time, the Securities and Exchange Commission brought civil charges against Stockman related to actions he took while CEO of Collins & Aikman. Stockman suffered a personal financial loss, estimated at $13 million, along with losses suffered by as many as 15,000 Collins & Aikman employees worldwide. Stockman said in a statement posted on his law firm's Web site that the company's collapse was the consequence of an industry melt-down, not fraud. In August 2008, a trial date was set but on January 9, 2009, the U.S. Attorney's Office announced that it did not intend to prosecute Stockman in this case.

Other investments in the Heartland portfolio included auto parts suppliers Metaldyne and TriMas as well as Springs Industries, a manufacturer of home furnishings.
