= Marge Carson =

American furniture manufacturing company

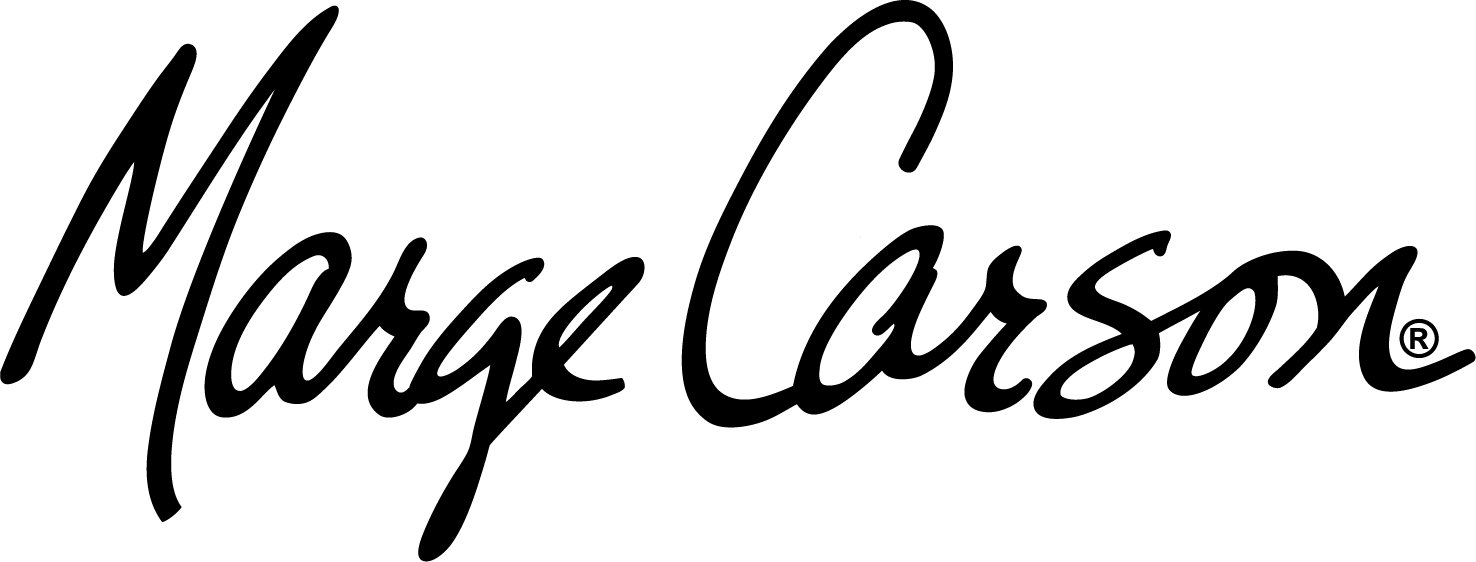
- Type: Private
- Industry: Furniture Manufacturing
- Founded: 1947; 79 years ago
- Founder: Marjorie Reese Carson
- Headquarters: Clarendon Hills, Illinois
- Area served: Worldwide
- Key people: Janet Linly (CEO)
- Website: margecarson.com

Marge Carson is an American furniture manufacturing company founded in 1947 by Marjorie Reese Carson in California. The company has gained prominence after World War II.

== History ==
Marge Carson brand was founded in 1947 by Marjorie Reese Carson. A designer focused on producing furniture that combined European and American design elements. The company began in California and developed a reputation for its craftsmanship and custom-made furniture.

Marge Carson Inc was acquired by Masco in the late 1980s. In 1995, Jim LaBarge led a management buyout from Masco and expanded the business from the United States to Mexico, and Indonesia. During this time, the company also grew its presence in High Point, NC furniture market. In 2022, after two decades of ownership, Jim LaBarge sold the Marge Carson brand to Janet Linly.

Janet Linly, founder and CEO of Linly Designs, an interior design firm based in Chicago, acquired the Marge Carson brand in 2022. This acquisition included the company's manufacturing facility in Mexico, allowing Linly to continue the brand's tradition of artisan craftsmanship. Under her management, Marge Carson has been restructured as an exclusive luxury brand, with distribution limited to select showrooms and designers worldwide. Linly's leadership has aimed to preserve the company's legacy while adapting it to contemporary market preferences and expectations.

In October 2025, Marge Carson CEO Janet Linly announced the opening of a new factory in Mexico, representing a major expansion of the company’s manufacturing operations there. The new facility builds on more than three decades of Marge Carson’s presence in Mexico and is intended to strengthen collaboration between its U.S. and international production teams.

In 2026, Marge Carson launched Marge Carson Mexico, its first dedicated branded sales and client-services operation in the country. Although the company had manufactured furniture in Mexico for more than 30 years, the new operation established its first direct commercial presence under the Marge Carson name in the Mexican market.

Marge Carson marked a significant milestone in its nearly 80-year history with the introduction of The Signature Edit, its first direct-to-consumer furniture collection. Announced in October 2026, the initiative represented a shift in the company's traditional distribution model, making a curated selection of its handcrafted luxury furnishings available for purchase directly through its website. The collection features a limited, rotating assortment of furniture offered in preselected fabrics and finishes, with exclusive online pricing and expedited delivery. Unlike Marge Carson's traditional bespoke offerings, The Signature Edit eliminates individual customization while retaining the brand's established manufacturing processes and craftsmanship.

Janet Linly, President and CEO of Marge Carson Global, described the initiative as an evolution of the company's heritage: “Luxury should evolve with the way people live and shop. The Signature Edit allows us to introduce Marge Carson to a broader audience without compromising the craftsmanship, quality, and artistry that have defined our brand for nearly eight decades.” The expansion was designed to complement the company's longstanding relationships with interior designers and luxury retailers, preserving its fully customizable collections as a distinct part of the business.
