= TiLite =

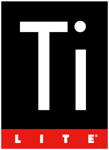
- Industry: Manufacturing
- Headquarters: Pasco, Washington, United States
- Area served: Global
- Key people: David Lippes (CEO)
- Products: Wheelchairs
- Parent: TiSports LLC
- Website: tilite.com

TiLite is a company that produces custom ultralight manual wheelchairs made from titanium, aluminum, and carbon fiber materials. The company is known for creating personalized wheelchairs through a process called TiFit, which involves tailoring each wheelchair to the exact specifications of its user.

== History ==
Today, TiLite designs and manufactures wheelchairs, but it originally got its start manufacturing high performance bicycle frames as Ti Sport Tech (TST). In 1988 TST was incorporated by David Lippes and soon after started producing rigid manual wheelchair frames from titanium. Tilite's dual tube frame design found in some of their chairs was based on the triangular design of most bicycle frames.

One of its earliest models being the "CrossSport." Over time, the company has expanded its range of offerings to include titanium and aluminum wheelchairs.

As a division of TiSport, LLC, TiLite's headquarters are located in Pasco, Washington. In 2014, the company was acquired by Permobil, a Swedish company that makes power wheelchairs and seating systems.

== Technology ==
TiLite uses Titanium for the frames of several lines of its wheelchairs. Titanium has unique properties, but because Titanium is difficult to refine it is a more costly material. TiLite makes wheelchairs in both Titanium and Aluminum. While the company's Titanium chairs are slightly lighter in weight and more durable, their Aluminum wheelchairs are more economical and sufficient for most users. The design and manufacturing process uses parametric modelling, computer aided design, and finite element analysis technologies to make decisions about the design and materials used.

== Additional sources ==
- “TiLite Makes Marketing, Product & Brand Management Moves” Mobility Management, 8 March 2013.
- TiLite Wheelchairs on Made in America – Full Episode (TiLite official YouTube channel)
