= Ford Observatory =

Astronomical Observatory in California, USA

Coordinates: 34°22′55″N 117°40′54″W

The Clinton B. Ford Observatory (Wrightwood) (Observatory Code 674) is an astronomical observatory that is associated historically with the American Association of Variable Star Observers (AAVSO). The observatory is located near the border of the Angeles National Forest and the San Bernardino National Forest near Wrightwood, California (United States). It was founded by the late astronomer Clinton B. Ford.

In 2012, the Clinton B. Ford Observatory was donated to the Los Angeles Astronomical Society (LAAS).

On September 10th, 2024, the Bridge Fire rapidly approached and completely destroyed the observatory.

== Telescope ==
The observatory contains an 18-inch, f/7 newtonian reflector.

== Nearby observatory ==
- Table Mountain Observatory, Wrightwood, California

== See also ==
- List of observatory codes
