= Milgard =

American window and door manufacturer est. 1958

Milgard Windows & Doors
- Milgard official logo in 2026
- Type: Subsidiary
- Industry: Window and door manufacturing
- Founded: 1958; 68 years ago
- Founders: Maurice Milgard; Gary Milgard
- Headquarters: Tacoma, Washington, United States
- Parent: Miter Brands
- Website: milgard.com

Milgard Windows & Doors is an American manufacturer of windows and patio doors based in Tacoma, Washington. Founded in 1958 by Maurice Milgard and his son Gary, the company later became part of Masco Corporation and was sold in 2019 to MI Windows and Doors.

== History ==
The company was founded in 1958 in Tacoma, Washington, where Maurice Milgard and his son Gary opened a small glass shop. His other son, Jim Milgard, joined in 1961 and helped grow the company over the following decades, staying on through the 2001 sale to Masco. It later expanded into the manufacture of vinyl, aluminum, fiberglass, and wood windows and patio doors. The company added patio doors to its line in 1968.

In 2003, the University of Washington Tacoma named its business school after the Milgard family. The family name is also borne by the Milgard Medical Pavilion at St. Anthony Hospital in Gig Harbor.

Masco Corporation acquired Milgard in 2001, when the company operated 16 plants. Over the following years, Milgard closed a number of facilities, including plant in Marysville, Washington, in 2008, plants in Hollister, California, Phoenix, and Chicago in 2011. In 2015, Milgard opened a new plant in Grand Prairie, Texas.

MI Windows and Doors acquired Milgard in November 2019 for $725 million. In 2022, MI Windows and Doors renamed its parent company Miter Brands, keeping Milgard as a regional brand. In 2020, the company's plants in Aurora, Colorado, and Grand Prairie were closed during the COVID-19 pandemic. In 2025, Milgard's plant in Simi Valley, California, was closed, affecting about 400 workers. In January 2026, Milgard completed a multimillion-dollar renovation of its fiberglass plant in Tacoma ahead of the launch of its C700 series.

In 2008, Milgard's SmartTouch window lock won an International Design Excellence Award from the Industrial Designers Society of America.

== See also ==
- Masco Corporation
- University of Washington Tacoma
