= Associated Chamber Music Players =

The Associated Chamber Music Players (ACMP) is an international organization of musicians - mostly amateur but also some professionals - devoted to playing chamber music. The organization publishes a directory of musicians worldwide—in print and online; members can contact other players and arrange chamber music sessions. ACMP publishes a guide to chamber music workshops around the world, and has a fund to support chamber music education and engagement programs.

== History ==
ACMP was founded in 1947 by Helen B. Rice and Leonard Strauss, both amateur violinists who traveled often and sought partners for chamber music evenings in travel destinations, as described in the book Helen Rice, The Great Lady of Chamber Music by Rustin McIntosh. Ms. Rice took the initiative to organize the first directory of chamber music players, and managed a directory of thousands of players around the world until her death in 1980.

In 1993, Clinton B. Ford, a businessman, amateur violinist and amateur astronomer, bequeathed an endowment of about four million dollars to ACMP. With the funds, ACMP set up a foundation for supporting chamber music programs and workshops.

From November July 2020, Stephanie Griffin, an arts administration professional, has served as executive director.

== Programs ==
The ACMP Directory of chamber music players is available both in printed form and at the ACMP website, and lists more than 2,500 musicians from 22 countries.

Each year since 2013, ACMP has initiated the Worldwide Play-in Weekend, an international event where musicians gather all over the world to play chamber music on the same weekend More than 150 play-ins have taken place, involving thousands of chamber music players of all ages, backgrounds and levels, including in Geneva, Switzerland; Madrid, Spain; Munich Germany; Tel Aviv, Israel; Vancouver and Toronto, Canada; and Podgorica, Montenegro, as well as across the U.S. in San Diego, San Francisco, Oakland, Blacksburg, VA, Mystic, CT, Philadelphia, PA, Washington, DC, Colorado, and New York.

The annual Livestream Masterclass helps players worldwide enhance their skills in an accessible online educational experience. In real-time and broadcast across the internet, a professional ensemble provides tips and coaching by interacting with two learning quartets. In 2018, the professional ensemble PubliQUARTET guided the Livestream Masterclass; in 2019, Catalyst Quartet led the Livestream Masterclass with students from the Chamber Music Center of New York and Face the Music of the Kaufman Music Center. The Live Streaming Masterclass in 2020 was led by Jasper String Quartet The Masterclasses are also archived online for those wishing to watch it after the broadcast.

In 2019, ACMP began its minicoaching video series, Chamber Music Animato! The first three videos feature players from Imani Winds on wind playing, followed by three minicoaching video sessions on string playing with PUBLIQuartet.

Additional resources offered by ACMP include the Chamber Music Workshop Guide, available in print and on the ACMP website, a directory of worldwide playing sessions offered to adult amateur players. ACMP also makes available 200,000 chamber music works.

From 2017 to 2020, ACMP sponsored From the Top through the ACMP Young Chamber Ensemble Program, supporting two young musician ensembles annually.

ACMP maintains a website, which provides information to ACMP members and the public. In 2018-2019, ACMP received funding for its work from the New York City Department of Cultural Affairs.

== The ACMP Foundation ==
Since 1994, the ACMP Foundation has awarded more than 4 million dollars in grants to support programs for adult amateur players and community-based music education programs for young musicians and others.

The ACMP Foundation provides grants to foster the playing of chamber music for people of all ages and skill levels. Grants are provided for ongoing programs and special projects around the world that promote participatory chamber music activities and education. Recipients have included chamber music workshops and education programs by music schools and centers, music camps for children and adults in the United States, Europe, Israel, and elsewhere. Also included are grants to amateur ensembles that seek coaching from professional players.

ACMP presents two awards annually. The Helen Rice Award, given in memory of ACMP's founder, recognizes those who have moved the chamber music world in new directions. Recent recipients include Edward Guo, founder of IMSLP (International Music Score Library Project), a comprehensive online resource of public domain music. The Susan McIntosh Lloyd Award for excellence and diversity in chamber music education is given annually to a music education organization. Recent recipients have included the Preucil School of Music, Iowa City, IA; The Sphinx Organization, Detroit, MI; and the Chamber Music Center, New York, New York.
