= Electro Freeze =

Manufacturer of frozen dessert machines

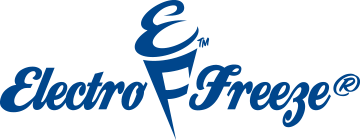
- Logo updated in February 2013 to include the EF cone.
- Founded: 1929; 97 years ago in New York, USA
- Founder: Charles Ericson
- Parent: ALI HOLDING SRL
- Website: https://electrofreeze.com/

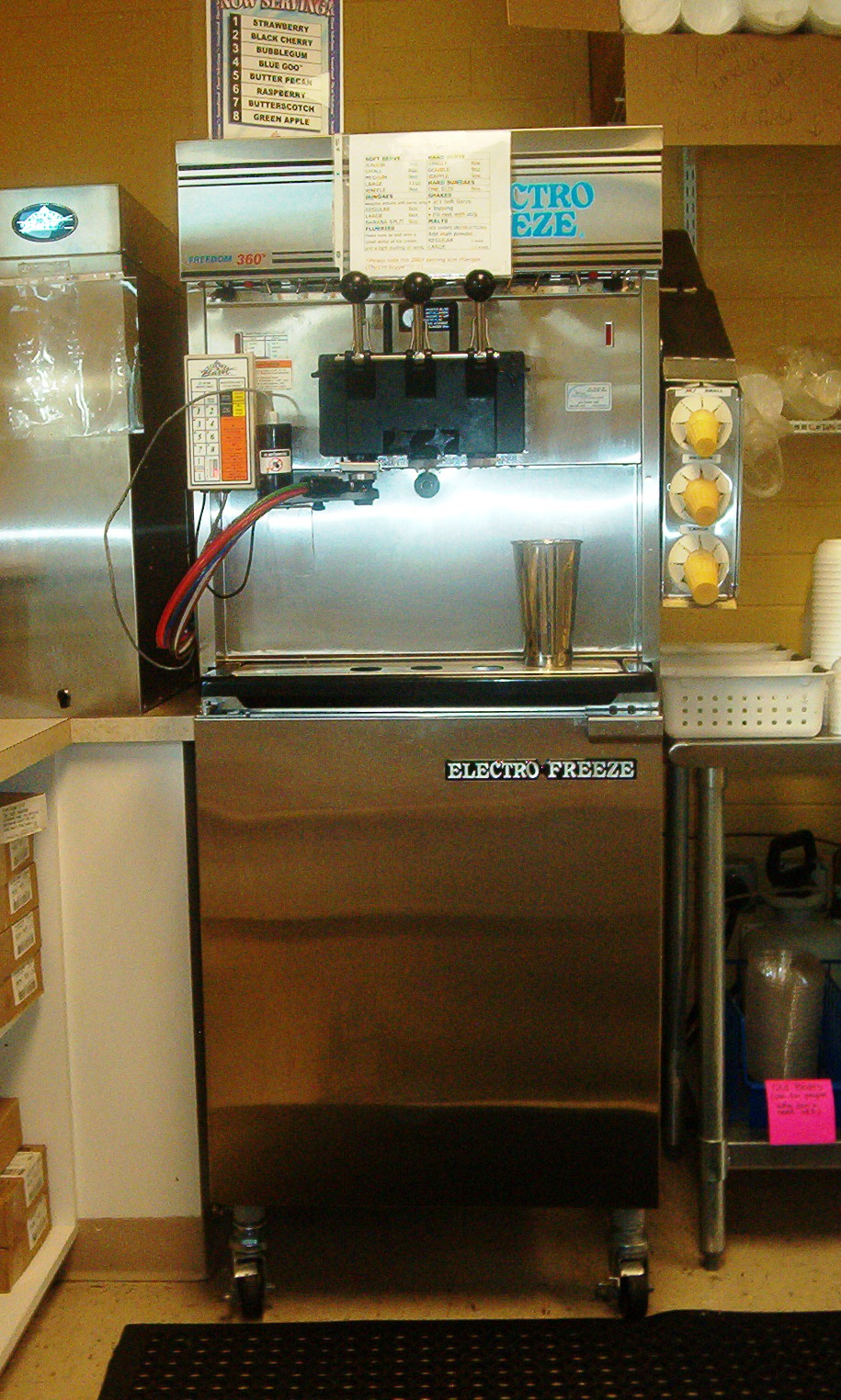
An Electro Freeze 30T-RMT pressurized soft serve dispensing machine.

Electro Freeze is an Ali Group brand specializing in the manufacturing of frozen dessert machines including soft serve machines, shake machines, slush machines, and batch freezers, and is a division of H.C. Duke & Son LLC. It is most known for being the soft serve machine used by Dairy Queen, Carvel, and Sonic Drive-In, as well as many other soft serve ice cream establishments.

== History ==
Electro Freeze was founded in 1929 by Charles Ericson. The trucks of Mister Softee's are equipped with Electro Freeze soft-serve machines. The H.C. Duke & Son LLC company purchased Electro Freeze in 1969. In 2003, the Ali Group (ALI HOLDING SRL) bought H.C. Duke & Son LLC.

In September 2022, Victoria Campbell was named the president of Electro Freeze.

== Partnerships ==
Electro Freeze has distribution locations across the United States of America and partners with various distributors across Canada, Europe, and other locations internationally.

In February 2020, Electro Freeze teamed up with Zink Foodservice as its regional selling partner. They will represent Electro Freeze in markets across Ohio, Michigan, Northern Kentucky, Northern Illinois, Wisconsin, West Virginia, Indiana, and Western Pennsylvania.

They are a part of the following industry associations: North American Association of Food Equipment Manufacturers, National Ice Cream Retailers Association, and the National Restaurant Association.

== Products and services ==
Electro Freeze is a manufacturer of machines for soft serve yogurt, soft serve ice cream, shake, slush & smoothie frozen beverages, and frozen cocktails.

The 30T-RMT Pressurized Twist Freezer is one of their soft serve machines. In May 2014, Electro Freeze introduced the first soft serve machine to produce 9 soft serve flavors, the 44RMTFB 9 Flavor Fuzionate, and premiered the machine at the National Restaurant Association Show in Chicago, IL on May 17-20, 2014.
