= Kopernik Observatory & Science Center =

Public observatory in Vestal, New York, U.S.

Kopernik Space Center
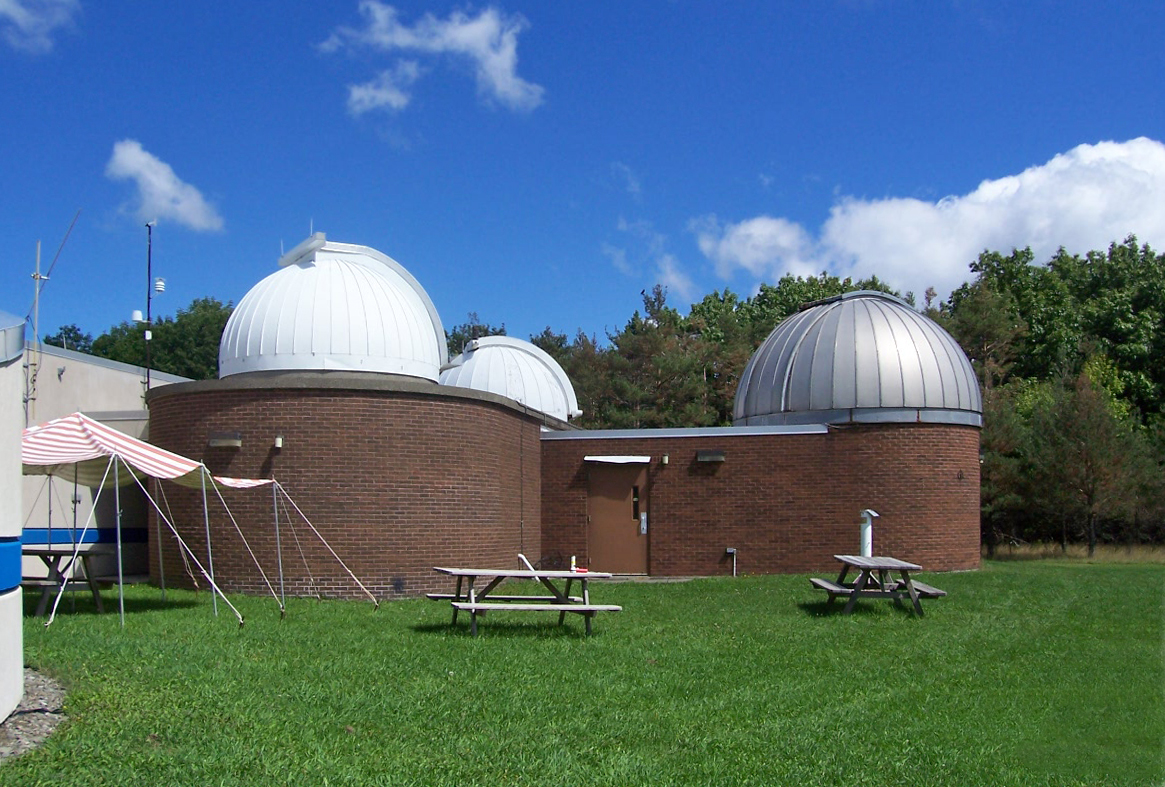
- Kopernik Observatory Equatorial Domes
- Alternative names: Kopernik Observatory & Science Center
- Location: Vestal, Broome County, New York
- Coordinates: 42°00′08″N 76°02′01″W
- Altitude: 1,740 ft (530 m)
- Established: 16 June 1974
- Website: www.kopernik.org

Telescopes
- E. Jay Sarton Telescope: 6 in (150 mm) Astro-Physics Super Planetary f/12 refractor
- Broome County Telescope: 14 in (360 mm) Celestron C14 f/11 Schmidt-Cassegrain reflector
- Kopernik Astronomy Society Telescope: 20 in (510 mm) Optical Guidance Systems f/8 Ritchey-Chretien reflector
- Robert "Barlow Bob" Godfrey Solar Telescope: 4 in (100 mm) f/12 Heliostat Solar refactor telescope
- Location of Kopernik Observatory & Science Center
- Related media on Commons

The Kopernik Observatory & Science Center (KOSC), is a public observatory in Vestal, New York opened to the public on June 16, 1974, by the Kopernik Society of Broome County to commemorate the 500th anniversary of the birth of the astronomer Nicolaus Copernicus (Polish: Mikołaj Kopernik) in 1973. Its mission is to offer hands-on investigations and outreach programs for educating all ages about astronomy and science using advanced optical telescopes, computers and other tools. It is the first science laboratory facility in New York State designed for K-12 teachers, students and their families, and has been one of the best-sited and best equipped public observatories in the Northeast United States for nearly the last 40 years.

== History ==
=== Original construction ===
In 1973, the Kopernik Polish Cultural Society of Broome County organized to build a community observatory to commemorate the 500th anniversary of the birth of the astronomer Nicolaus Copernicus (Polish: Mikołaj Kopernik). The society's goal was for everyone in the region, regardless of ethnic background, to experience the universe firsthand at the new Kopernik Observatory. The Kopernik Society secured donations of materials, services and funds from the community and planned for construction to begin in the fall of 1973. General Contractor Edward Nezelek, Chairman of the Kopernik Observatory committee, completed the observatory in the spring of 1974. The facility, designed by James Kilcy, consisted of a 2,500-square-foot (230 m^{2}) astronomical observatory with two telescope domes.

After the Observatory was opened to the public on June 16, 1974, the Kopernik Society donated the facility to the people of the Southern Tier region, to be operated by the Roberson Museum and Science Center as the Roberson-Kopernik Observatory, part of Roberson's educational initiative and to complement the major planetarium already in operation at its Binghamton site.

=== Major expansion ===
With major support from the Kopernik Society, the Decker Foundation, and many other community organizations, Roberson undertook a $2 million expansion of the Observatory to create the Kopernik Space Education Center in 1992. It would convert the Roberson-Kopernik Observatory into the first science laboratory facility in New York State designed for K-12 teachers, students and their families. The envisioned expansion would add a third equatorial room with a large telescopes, four classrooms, a space science theater, and laser physics and computer-imaging laboratories. Construction of the Center began in the fall of 1992, Kenneth R. Gay II was the Architect, and the 8,000-square-foot (740 m^{2}) facility addition opened in June 1993.

The Kopernik Society and the Roberson Museum hosted a grand 25th anniversary celebration event on June 5, 1999, at the Kopernik Space Education Center. The celebration showcased Kopernik's facilities, programs, and the partnership with the Polish community that made it all possible. The 25th anniversary guests included scientists, NASA officials, long time supporters and students from Kopernik Talent Search programs. The event highlighted the growth of the Kopernik facility from a local observatory into a science education center of national significance.

=== Financial troubles ===
Fortunes changed by 2005 when the Kopernik Space Education Center operated at a $45,000 loss. The Roberson Museum and Science Center, under severe financial strain, was seriously considering cutting major funding and programs at the Observatory while continuing its summer program and Friday night astronomy sessions in 2006.

It's a separate physical entity and so it incurs a large cost there and it also has a large salary line because there are a number of people who teach through that program.

— Roberson Executive Director, Terry McDonald'

The funding changes concerned the Kopernik Society of Broome County and supporters of the Observatory.

Certainally you can search on the internet and get a picture from hubble, but to look at a telescope and get hands on real hardware is a big difference than seeing things on a screen.

— Vestal native and former NASA Astronaut Daniel W. Bursch

The Kopernik Society conducted months of negotiations out of which an agreement was reached that returned ownership and operation of the Kopernik Space Education Center from the Roberson Museum back to the Kopernik Society in March 2007.

It will help in a certain capacity, it's not just finance that it's about, it's really focusing on the missions of the institutions.

— Roberson Executive Director, Terry McDonald'

The name of the center changed to the Kopernik Observatory and Science Education Center and it needed to generate about $54,000 each year from federal / state grants, fund-raisers, and company / public donations. Under the transfer agreement Kopernik had to balance its operating budget through 2011, otherwise Roberson could resume control of the facility.

=== Independent operation ===
The name was changed again to Kopernik Observatory & Science Center. Celebrated its 40th anniversary in 2014 with a grand gala at the Binghamton University campus. Windsor native and former NASA astronaut Douglas H. Wheelock was the keynote speaker.

=== Observatory directors ===
- Richard DeLuca, (1973–1975)
- Richard Aguglia, (1975–1981)
- Vacant (1981)
- E. Jay Sarton, (1982–1996)
- Carol Stowell (1996–1999)
- Kristen Gordon (2006–2011)
- Andrew "Drew" Deskur, (2011 (interim), 2012–present)

== Programs and services ==
Its mission is to offer hands-on investigations and outreach programs for educating all ages about astronomy and science using advanced optical telescopes, computers and other tools. It is the first science laboratory facility in New York State designed for K-12 teachers, students and their families and has been one of the best-sited and best equipped public observatories in the Northeast United States for nearly the last 40 years.

The Observatory is a member of the Association of Science-Technology Centers and participates in the ASTC Passport Program. The Passport Program allows members of a participating institution to visit other participating institutions for free, provided the member is visiting an institution more than 90 miles from their home institution.

=== Public programs ===
The Observatory holds public events every Friday evening, but due to changing seasonal sunsets times the Observatory adjusts its program starting times; March–May at 8:00 pm, June–July at 8:30 pm, August–November at 8:00 pm, December–February at 7:00 pm. Friday evening topics include Optical Astronomy, Radio Astronomy, Technology, and related subjects.

There are a number of special events that are held throughout the year.

==== Winter Star Party ====
The annual Winter Star Party, held since 2006, is usually on the last Saturday in January. Doors open at 6 pm and programs are held regardless of sky conditions. There are typically several speakers on various astronomy topics or brave the cold and see winter constellations, along with the Moon, Jupiter, the Orion Nebula, and much more through the Observatory's large telescopes.

==== RocketFest ====
The RocketFest has been held every June since 2008. Rocket building workshops will run every 3 hours starting at 9 a.m. and ending at 6 pm. Assistance is available to help assemble the model rocket, prepare the engine, and launch the rocket. Reservations are necessary to hold a place in one of the workshops and to pre-order the type of rocket including Standard rockets (A- or B-powered), suitable for younger children and beginning rocket builders, and Advanced rockets (D-powered) have stronger engines and are appropriate for those with more experience.

==== AstroFest ====
Kopernik AstroFest is a celebration of the night sky and amateur astronomy held annually in October since 1982. The 3-day event is sponsored jointly by the Observatory and the Kopernik Astronomical Society. AstroFest includes speakers on a variety of topics, demonstrations, an amateur astronomy roundtable discussion, the Kopernik AstroFest Solar Star Party, and nightly observing if skies are clear. Overnight non-fire camping is allowed on the facility grounds for an additional nominal cost.

==== Moonlight Café ====
On selected Saturday evenings in the Spring and Fall the main building of KOSC is transformed into a Moonlight Café. It is an adults-only evening where one can enjoy fresh-brewed coffee, tea, and delicious desserts along with a fascinating introduction to the stars and outer space. Registration is through SUNY Broome's Continuing Education Program.

=== School programs ===
The Observatory offers opportunities for students of all ages to experience a range of science, technology, engineering and math topics, known as STEM education. Classes run through the school year, on weekends and school holidays at the facility in addition to bringing programs directly to schools for individual classrooms or the entire school. The programs are aligned with mesh with New York State Department of Education and Pennsylvania Department of Education standards so they supplement what's being taught in the classroom.

==== Link Summer STEM exploration camps ====
Since 1992 the Kopernik Observatory & Science Center (KOSC) has offered week-long camps for students in grades 1–12. The camps are sponsored by the Link Foundation since 1994, in memory of local inventor / explorer Edwin A. Link, the Link Summer STEM Exploration camps offer hands-on, high-tech adventures in science, technology, engineering, and math. Students housed at Binghamton University with commuter and residential options are available.

Starting after the July 4 weekend, the Observatory offers week-long summer camps and day camps for students in grades one through 12. The camps are sequenced so that each year a student can come back and learn something new.

Visits to the Physics Department on the Binghamton University campus from the Kopernik Observatory's Space Science Education participants.

==== Summer science day programs ====
- Young Scientists (grades 1 & 2)
- Junior Astronomers (grades 3 & 4)
- Earth Science (grades 5 & 6)
- Young Engineers: (grades 2 & 3)
- Junior Engineers: (grades 4 & 5)
- Master Engineers: (grades 5 & 6)

== Facilities and equipment ==
The Observatory is the first science laboratory facility in New York State designed for K-12 teachers, students and their families and has been one of the best-sited and best equipped public observatories in the Northeast United States since its founding. The facility contains multiple types of equipment to support its primary mission.

=== Optical telescopes ===
The observatory has three main optical telescopes:

- E. Jay Sarton Telescope in the eastern equatorial room is a 6 in (150 mm) f/12 Super Planetary Refractor manufactured by Astro-Physics of Machesney Park, Illinois, US, which uses a G11 equatorial mount from Losmandy of Los Angeles, California. The telescope is dedicated to former Observatory Director E. Jay Sarton.
- Broome County Telescope in the western equatorial room is a 14 in (360 mm) f/11 C14 Schmidt–Cassegrain reflector manufactured by Celestron of Torrance, California, USA, which uses a Celestron CGE Computerized German Equatorial Mount. The telescope was donated in 1987 to the Observatory as "A gift from the people of the Southern Tier".
- KAS Telescope in the southern equatorial room is a 20 in (510 mm) f/8 Ritchey–Chrétien reflector and German equatorial mount manufactured by Optical Guidance Systems of Huntingdon Valley, Pennsylvania, US. The telescope was donated by the Kopernik Astronomical Society. It is one of the largest publicly usable telescopes in New York State.
- The Robert "Barlow Bob" Godfrey Heliostat is mounted in the main building's physics laboratory/classroom. It is basically two mirrors angled just right to reflect light into an 4 in (100 mm) f/12 refractor telescope that runs about 6 in (150 mm) down through the ceiling and projects the solar image projected as a 7 in (180 mm) diameter white-light image onto the classroom wall. The mirrors track the sun through electric servo motors. The telescope was dedicated in 2014 to Robert A. "Barlow Bob" Godfrey.

There are a number of other telescope available for use including four 8 in (200 mm) Orion Newtonians, one 10 in (250 mm) Meade Newtonian, and twelve 4 1/8 in (105 mm) f/4.2 Astroscan aluminized and overcoated borosilicate glass parabolic primary mirror with a focal length of 17 1/2 in (444 mm). A SBIG STL-1301E CCD camera is also available.

=== Amateur radio station ===
The Kopernik Observatory & Science Center has a permanent amateur radio station using the club call sign: K2ZRO. The station is often open during public programs on Friday evenings. The call sign K2ZRO belonged to Kazimierz Deskur, one of the founding members of the Kopernik Society, who built the Kopernik Observatory. Deskur heard some of the first signals from Sputnik, and this led to his interest in amateur radio satellites (the facility has an original Sputnik QSL card). He was an early pioneer in amateur radio satellites and developed a device called the OSCARLocator, a great circle map-like device to aid hams in tracking them.

== Location and climate ==
The facility is located atop a 1,740 ft (530.35 m) hill in Vestal, New York, 13 mi (20.92 km) southwest of Binghamton, New York within the Allegheny Plateau. The site lies on the western ridge line of the Choconut Creek, part of the Susquehanna River Basin, a few hundred feet north of the New York – Pennsylvania border. The surrounding area is a product of significant glaciation that has removed any sharp relief of the hills seen in other unglaciated areas of the plateau. The tops of the hills in the area, including where the Observatory is located, approximate the level of a peneplain that was uplifted to form the plateau.

The Observatory is located in a humid continental climate (Köppen Dfb), characterized with cold, snowy winters and warm, wet summers. The surrounding region is the 10th rainiest area in the United States, with 162 rainy days a year. With 212 cloudy days annually, it is also the seventh cloudiest city in the country, and the cloudiest east of the Rocky Mountains.

Climate data for Kopernik Observatory & Science Center, Vestal, New York (Note: Official records for Binghamton were kept exclusively at the airport since May 25, 1951.)
| Month | Jan | Feb | Mar | Apr | May | Jun | Jul | Aug | Sep | Oct | Nov | Dec | Year |
|---|---|---|---|---|---|---|---|---|---|---|---|---|---|
| Record high °F (°C) | 63 (17) | 66 (19) | 82 (28) | 89 (32) | 89 (32) | 94 (34) | 98 (37) | 95 (35) | 96 (36) | 85 (29) | 77 (25) | 65 (18) | 98 (37) |
| Mean daily maximum °F (°C) | 28.7 (−1.8) | 32.1 (0.1) | 41.1 (5.1) | 54.2 (12.3) | 65.5 (18.6) | 73.7 (23.2) | 77.8 (25.4) | 76.5 (24.7) | 68.4 (20.2) | 56.8 (13.8) | 45.1 (7.3) | 33.3 (0.7) | 54.4 (12.4) |
| Mean daily minimum °F (°C) | 15.7 (−9.1) | 17.4 (−8.1) | 24.6 (−4.1) | 35.9 (2.2) | 46.1 (7.8) | 55.2 (12.9) | 59.6 (15.3) | 58.3 (14.6) | 50.7 (10.4) | 40.1 (4.5) | 31.4 (−0.3) | 21.2 (−6.0) | 38.0 (3.3) |
| Record low °F (°C) | −20 (−29) | −15 (−26) | −7 (−22) | 9 (−13) | 25 (−4) | 33 (1) | 39 (4) | 37 (3) | 25 (−4) | 17 (−8) | 3 (−16) | −18 (−28) | −20 (−29) |
| Average precipitation inches (mm) | 2.45 (62) | 2.31 (59) | 2.99 (76) | 3.43 (87) | 3.57 (91) | 4.31 (109) | 3.70 (94) | 3.45 (88) | 3.63 (92) | 3.33 (85) | 3.30 (84) | 2.83 (72) | 39.30 (998) |
| Average snowfall inches (cm) | 22.2 (56) | 17.1 (43) | 15.1 (38) | 4.3 (11) | 0.1 (0.25) | 0 (0) | 0 (0) | 0 (0) | 0 (0) | 1.0 (2.5) | 5.8 (15) | 17.8 (45) | 83.4 (212) |
| Average precipitation days | 15.7 | 13.1 | 14.6 | 13.4 | 13.7 | 12.6 | 11.8 | 10.6 | 11.1 | 12.5 | 14.6 | 15.5 | 159.2 |
| Average snowy days | 16.9 | 13.3 | 10.4 | 3.4 | 0.2 | 0 | 0 | 0 | 0 | 0.9 | 6.0 | 13.4 | 64.5 |
| Average relative humidity (%) | 74.0 | 72.4 | 69.3 | 64.9 | 67.0 | 72.0 | 72.0 | 75.4 | 78.1 | 73.8 | 76.4 | 78.4 | 72.8 |
| Mean monthly sunshine hours | 113.0 | 125.9 | 172.5 | 205.1 | 252.4 | 274.6 | 295.3 | 256.8 | 202.0 | 162.5 | 92.9 | 79.7 | 2,232.7 |
| Percentage possible sunshine | 38 | 43 | 47 | 51 | 56 | 60 | 64 | 60 | 54 | 47 | 32 | 28 | 50 |
Source: NOAA (relative humidity and sun 1961–1990)

== Associated organizations ==
=== Kopernik Astronomical Society ===
The Observatory is also the home of the Kopernik Astronomical Society (KAS), a group of dedicated observational astronomers. The Kopernik Astronomical Society's (KAS) mission is to provide the Binghamton, NY area with resources to those who are interested in astronomy, space, and science collaboration. This is accomplished by providing support for the Kopernik Observatory and Science Center through volunteerism, hosting public outreach events, education programs, and by sharing experiences and information to anyone who might have a question. In addition to outreach, the KAS embarks on adventures for astronomical observation through field trips to dark sky parks, conferences, star parties, as well as observation sessions at Kopernik Observatory.

The society meets the 1st Wednesday of each month. Meetings start at 7 pm and last about one hour, followed by observing (if clear). These meetings consist of an overview of next month's events, equipment issues, and observing tips.

=== Binghamton Amateur Radio Association ===
The Binghamton Amateur Radio Association, Inc. (BARA), founded in 1919, has a rich history of technical achievements, community service and having fun in just about all aspects of amateur radio. It holds a Club Call of W2OW from the FCC. General meetings are open to all, club members and non-members alike, and are held on the Third Wednesday of every month, starting at 7 pm at the Kopernik Observatory.

== See also ==
- List of astronomical societies
- List of science centers in the United States
- List of astronomical observatories
- List of amateur radio organizations
