= Delta Faucet Company =

Plumbing fixtures company

- Type: Subsidiary
- Industry: Manufacturing
- Founded: 1954; 72 years ago (as Delta Faucet Company)
- Headquarters: Carmel, Indiana, United States
- Products: Plumbing materials
- Parent: Masco
- Website: deltafaucet.com

Delta Faucet Company is an American manufacturer of plumbing fixtures and plumbing materials. It is a subsidiary of Masco Corporation. It manufactures and markets faucets, kitchen sinks, bath/shower fixtures, steam showers, and water filtration units under the Delta, Brizo, Newport Brass, Kraus, and Peerless brand names.

== History ==
Delta Faucet Company is a division owned by Masco, which was founded in Detroit in 1929 by Armenian immigrant Alex Manoogian. In 1952, an eager inventor brought Manoogian his latest invention, a one-handled faucet that mixed both hot and cold water with a ball-valve. Unfortunately it leaked, but Manoogian was intrigued by the idea of utilizing hot and cold water with a single lever He therefore bought the faucet and its rights, improved it, and released it. The faucet remains successful, although other companies soon designed other single-handle faucets that didn't infringe Delta's patents.

In 1958, the company opened a manufacturing facility in Greensburg, Indiana. In 1976, another facility in Chickasha, Oklahoma was opened (The Chickasha facility closed in 2006), followed by Jackson, Tennessee in 1995. The company also operates manufacturing facilities in Santa Ana, California; Lapeer, Michigan; Morgantown, Kentucky; East Rutherford, New Jersey; and one outside the United States in Panyu, China. Delta Faucet Company is headquartered in Indianapolis, Indiana.

In 2011, Delta introduced the Touch2O and Touch2O.xt series of kitchen and bathroom faucets, the former with touch sensors and the latter designed for hands-free operation with capacitive sensors.

In 2017, Delta started manufacturing its first kitchen sinks. Two years later, the complany introduced the VoiceIQ kitchen faucet, which can respond to voice commands via Amazon Alexa or Google Assistant. All Touch2O kitchen faucets manufactured since 2018 can be retrofitted with the VoiceIQ module to add VoiceIQ functionality to existing Touch2O faucets. Competitors include the U by Moen and the Kohler Sensate with Konnect smart kitchen faucets.

In 2020, Delta acquired the Kraus brand of plumbing fixtures, founded in 2007.

In February 2025, Masco folded Brasstech and the Newport Brass brand into its Delta Faucet division.

== See also ==
- Plumbing
