= Schwarzhorn =

Schwarzhorn may refer to mountains/peaks in:

== Austria ==
- Tilisuna-Schwarzhorn (2460 m), in the Rätikon range, in Vorarlberg

== Italy ==
- Schwarzhorn/Corno Nero (Monte Rosa) (4321 m), part of the Monte Rosa massif, on southern side of the Pennine Alps, in Italy just next to Swiss border (Ludwigshöhe)
- Schwarzhorn (South Tyrol)/Corno Nero (2439 m) in South Tyrol

== Switzerland ==
- Schwarzhorn (Bernese Alps) (2928 m), in the Bernese Alps between Brienz and Grindelwald (BE)
- Schwarzhorn (Binntal)/Punta Marani (3108 m), on the border to Italy in canton of Valais (VS), between the Binntal (Valais) and the Valle Dèvero (Piedmont)
- Schwarzhorn (Flüela) (3146 m), near Flüela Pass, Albula Alps (GR)
- Piz Gren/Schwarzhorn (2890 m), part of the Lepontine Alps, above Obersaxen, Vorderrhein (GR)
- Schwarzhorn (Mattertal) (3201 m), near St. Niklaus (VS), west of Embd
- Parpaner Schwarzhorn (2683 m), in the Grisons (GR), between Arosa and Lenzerheide
- Schwarzhorn (Rätikon) (2574 m), part of the Rätikon (GR), on the border to Liechtenstein
- Schwarzhorn (Vals) (2944 m), part of Lepontine Alps, west of Vals (GR)
- Schwarzhorn (Wildstrubel massif) (3105 m), in the Bernese Alps (BE), west of Leukerbad (VS)
- Schwarzhorn (Pennine Alps) (2789 m), just in between Saint-Luc and Chandolin, near the Illhorn and Bella Tola in Switzerland Valais.
- Schwarzberghorn/Corno Nero (3609 m), on southern side of the Pennine Alps, on the Swiss (VS) - Italian (Piedmont) border, the northern end of Weissgrat, meeting point of the Swiss Mattertal, Saastal, and the Italian Val Anzansca.
