= Schwarzer =

Schwarzer may refer to:

- Trollinger, a German/Italian wine grape variety
- St. Laurent (grape), a red wine grape variety

== Persons with the surname ==
- Alice Schwarzer (born 1942), German feminist
- Christian Schwarzer (born 1962), German handballer
- Daniela Schwarzer (born 1973), German politicial scientist
- Johann Schwarzer (1880–1914), Austrian photographer and film producer
- Mark Schwarzer (born 1972), Australian footballer
- Mitchell Schwarzer, American architectural historian
- William Schwarzer (1925–2017), American judge
- Zbigniew Schwarzer, Polish rower

== See also ==
- Schwarz (disambiguation)
- Schwartz (disambiguation)
