= Obersaxen Mundaun =

- Municipality
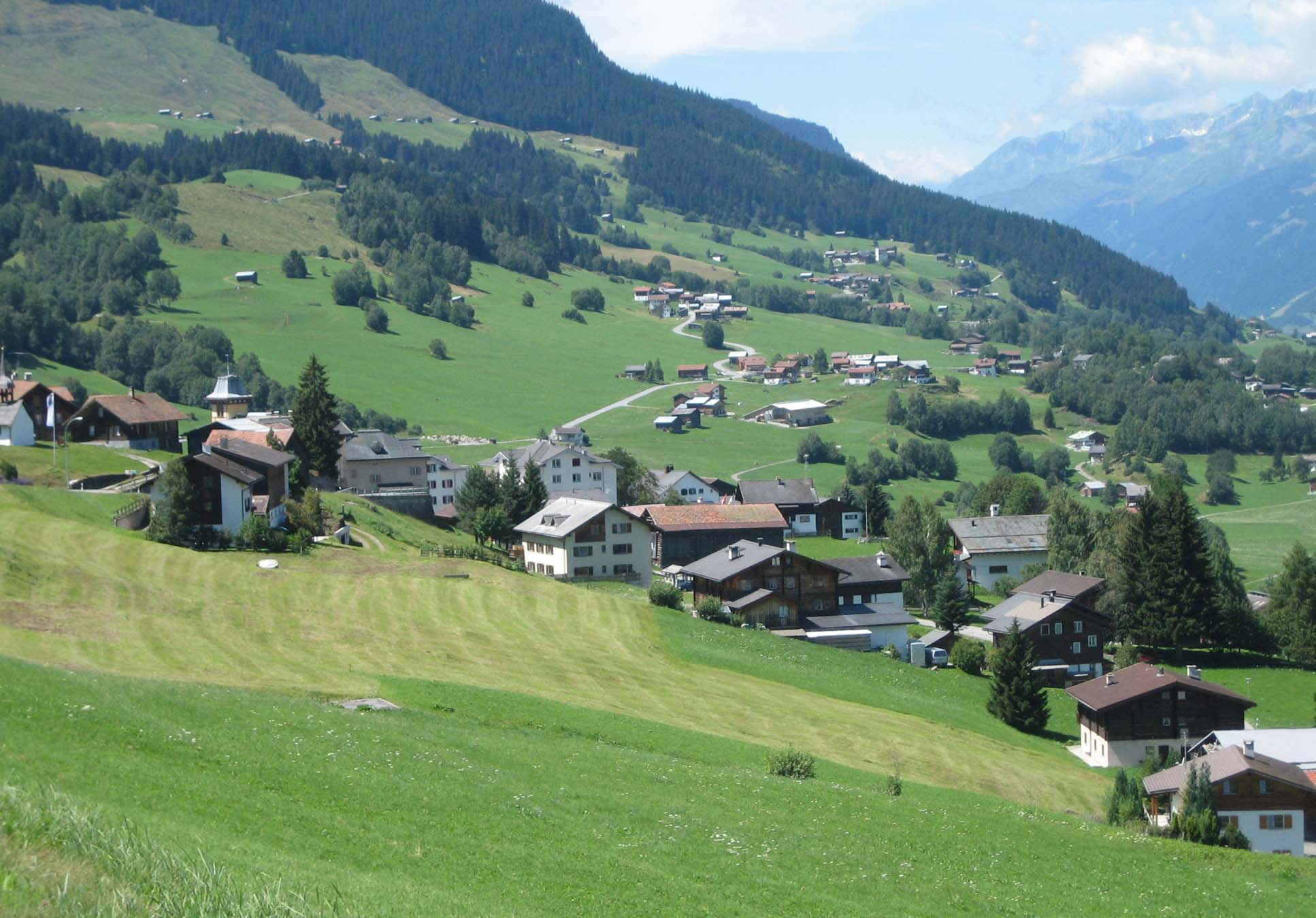
- Obersaxen village

- Flag Coat of arms
- Location of Obersaxen Mundaun
- Location within Switzerland Location within Canton of Grisons
- Coordinates: 46°44′N 9°6′E
- Country: Switzerland
- Canton: Grisons
- District: Surselva

Area
  - Total: 70.11 km^{2} (27.07 sq mi)

Population (Dec 2014)
  - Total: 1,139
  - Density: 16.25/km^{2} (42.08/sq mi)
- Time zone: UTC+01:00 (CET)
  - Summer (DST): UTC+02:00 (CEST)
- Postal code: 7134, 7137
- SFOS number: 3988
- ISO 3166 code: CH-GR
- Localities: Obersaxen, Mundaun
- Surrounded by: Breil/Brigels, Degen, Lumbrein, Rueun, Sumvitg, Trun, Vella, Vignogn, Waltensburg/Vuorz
- Website: www.obersaxenmundaun.swiss

Obersaxen Mundaun is a municipality in the Surselva Region in the Swiss canton of the Grisons. On 1 January 2016 the former municipalities of Obersaxen and Mundaun merged to form the new municipality of Obersaxen Mundaun.

== History ==
=== Obersaxen ===
The Obersaxen plateau first appears in historic records in 765, as Supersaxa, when Bishop Tello gave his farms and meadows there to Disentis Abbey. In 806 it became an Imperial Estate, which it remained until 956 when Emperor Otto I donated Supersaxa village and the village church back to the Bishop of Chur. In 1227 it was mentioned as Ubersahse.

The current settlement was founded in the thirteenth century, when a group of German-speaking Walser settled the plateau. Right in the heart of the mainly Romansh-speaking Surselva (which encompasses the valley of the Vorderrhein, along with all of its side valleys, among others the Val Lumnezia), Obersaxen is an island of German-speakers.

=== Mundaun ===
Mundaun was formed on 1 January 2009 through the merger of Flond and Surcuolm.

== Geography ==
Aerial view (1970)

Obersaxen Mundaun has an area, (based on the 2004/09 survey) of 70.36 km^{2} (27.17 sq mi). Of this area, about 53.4% is used for agricultural purposes, while 24.9% is forested. Of the rest of the land, 2.4% is settled (buildings or roads) and 19.4% is unproductive land. In the 2004/09 survey a total of 87 ha (210 acres) or about 1.2% of the total area was covered with buildings, an increase of 31 ha (77 acres) over the 1984/85 amount. Of the agricultural land, 892 ha (2,200 acres) is fields and grasslands and 2,991 ha (7,390 acres) consists of alpine grazing areas. Since 1984/85 the amount of agricultural land has decreased by 148 ha (370 acres). Over the same time period the amount of forested land has increased by 83 ha (210 acres). Rivers and lakes cover 81 ha (200 acres) in the municipality.

The new municipality is located in the Lugnez sub-district of the Surselva district, after 2017 it was part of the Surselva Region. It is located on the northern face of the Mundaun mountain chain and the Obersaxen high plateau south of the Vorderrhein river. It consists of a number of widely scattered settlements throughout the municipal area.

== Demographics ==
Obersaxen Mundaun has a population (as of December 2020) of 1,164

== Historic Population ==
The historical population of Obersaxen and the two former municipalities that made up Mundaun, Flond and Surcuolm, is given in the following chart:
