= Mundaun (video game) =

2021 video game

- Developer: Hidden Fields
- Publishers: MWM Interactive (2021–2023); Annapurna Interactive (2023–present)
- Director: Michel Ziegler
- Programmers: Ryan Miller; Simon Hischier; Michel Ziegler; Petr Karbula
- Writers: Gabrielle Alioth; Michel Ziegler
- Composer: Michel Barengo
- Engine: Unity
- Platforms: PlayStation 4; Windows; Xbox One; Nintendo Switch; PlayStation 5; Xbox Series X/S
- Release: PlayStation 4, Windows, Xbox One; March 16, 2021; Nintendo Switch; May 27, 2021; PlayStation 5, Xbox Series X/S; June 29, 2023
- Genres: Adventure game, folk horror
- Mode: Single-player

Mundaun is a 2021 first-person horror adventure video game created by Swiss developer Hidden Fields and published by MWM Interactive. In the game, the player tries to reach the top of the mountain while solving puzzles and warding off enemies. The dialogue in the game is mostly spoken in Romansh. Critics praised the game's sketchbook-like art style, but criticized some of the puzzles as being obtuse. The game was released on March 16, 2021, for PlayStation 4, Xbox One, and Microsoft Windows. A Nintendo Switch port was released on May 27. Versions for PlayStation 5 and Xbox Series X/S were released on June 29, 2023.

== Plot ==
The player plays as Curdin, who is returning to his grandfather's hometown for his funeral. He is told that his grandfather died in a barn fire, and was already buried, but when visiting the building's ruins he finds a burned corpse. Alongside this, he finds that his grandfather's grave is empty. Trying to uncover what happened to his grandfather, Curdin begins traveling to the top of the mountain.

== Gameplay ==
A village environment in Mundaun

Mundaun is a first-person video game where the player moves through various locations to get to the top of the mountain. Players find items and keys to solve environmental puzzles and unlock doors. As an example, in one puzzle the player has to hit meat slabs in a certain order to progress. Items from the player's inventory can also be used to solve puzzles. The player can travel up the mountain through walking, driving a truck or using a sled. Notes are hidden throughout the game's environments that help give context to Mundaun's world. A player can get upgrades in three different areas: "health, sanity, and marksmanship". Mundaun features four types of enemies, which are spread out in different areas of the game. Players can avoid them through stealth, ward them off using a lantern, or attack them with weapons. Non-violence is also an option, as the game can be completed without killing an enemy. Towards the end of the game, the player can make choices that determine which ending they will receive.

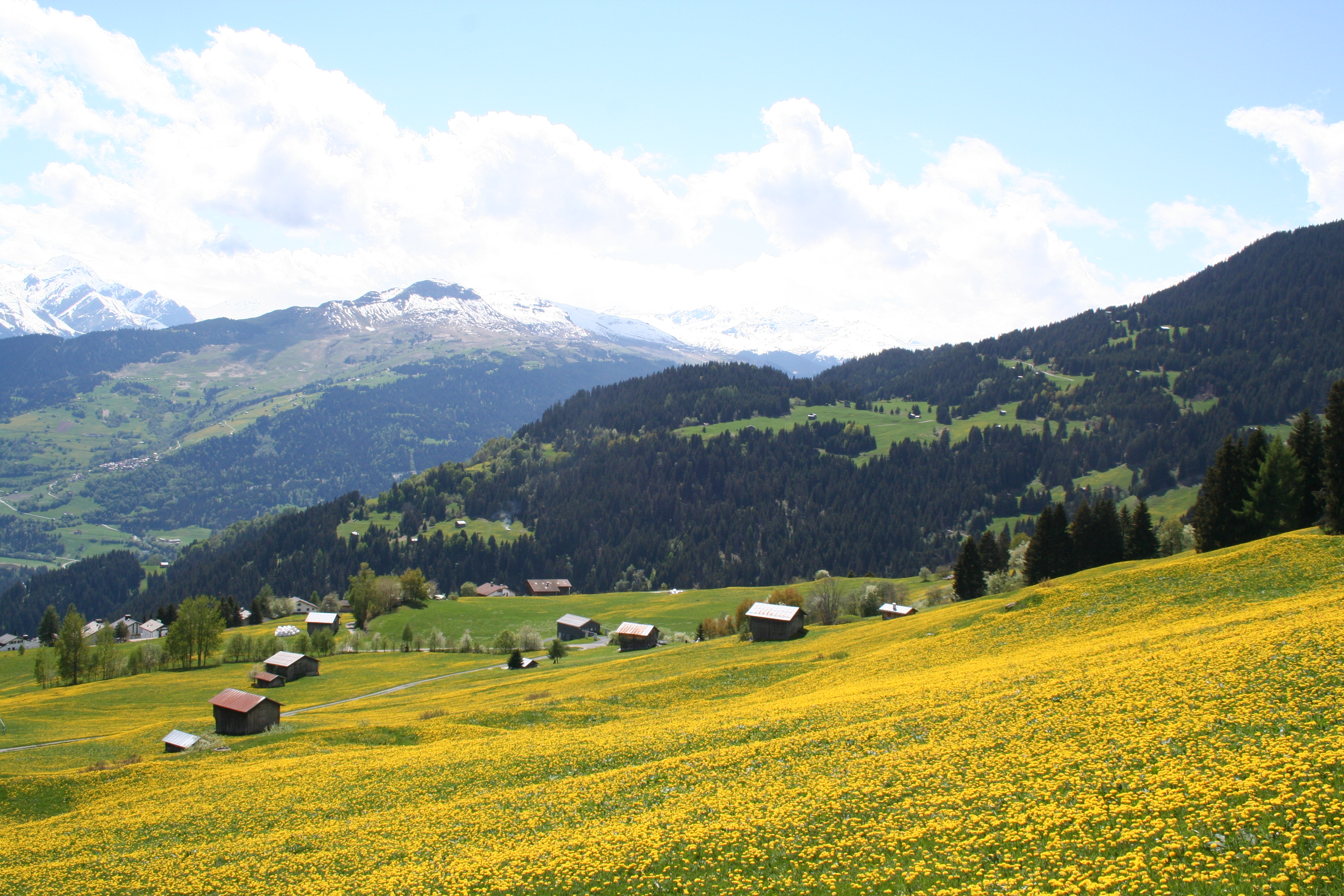
Mundaun, the town in Switzerland which serves as the game's namesake

== Development and release ==
Mundaun started development in 2014, through concepts made by the lead programmer and artist, Michel Ziegler. Ziegler created a small area around a chapel as a prototype for the game. The textures in the game were made through scanning sketchbook drawings and applying them to 3D models. This hand-penciled style was chosen because it made everyday objects seem like "dark, oppressive things". Various locations in the game were modeled after places in Switzerland, specifically Mundaun. The house of Swiss painter Alois Carigiet, Im Sunnefang, is entirely reproduced in the game as "The Painter's House". Carigiet is also responsible for the illustrations on the chapel walls, reproduced in-game by Michel Ziegler.

According to Ziegler, the story is inspired by works such as The Black Spider and The Shining.

Mundaun was a solo project until near release. The introduction of MWM Interactive as a publisher allowed additional funding, writers, programmers, and sound designers to join the project near the end of development. The game originally was slated for a 2019 release, but was pushed back to Spring 2021. Mundaun was released on March 16, 2021.

In 2023, Annapurna Interactive acquired publishing rights for the game and released an updated version for existing platforms alongside native versions for PlayStation 5 and Xbox Series X/S consoles.

== Reception ==
Reception

Aggregate scores
Aggregator	Score
Metacritic	PC: 72/100; PS4: 75/100; XONE: 73/100; NS: 72/100
OpenCritic	59% recommend

Review scores
Publication	Score
Edge	7/10
Game Informer	7.75/10
GameSpot	8/10
Jeuxvideo.com	12/20
Nintendo Life	8/10
Nintendo World Report	7.5/10
CGMagazine	5/10

Mundaun received "mixed or average" critical reviews on review aggregator website Metacritic, while the PlayStation 4 version received "generally favorable" reviews. OpenCritic determined that 59% of critics recommend the game.

In a positive review for Polygon, Cass Marshall praised the game's horror atmosphere, and how the hand-drawn art style helped create discomfort. However they also noted that the game could often be too visually dark, saying "even though I cranked my screen’s brightness to maximum, I still spent a few minutes spinning around in a dark room trying to find my way".

GameSpot's Andrew King enjoyed the game's means of travel, mentioning that "traversing the mountain in all these different ways--on foot, by sled, by truck--has the effect of making the mountain feel like a real place; a peak that must be considered to be conquered". He criticized one of Mundaun's early puzzles as being confusing to solve without trial and error. While enjoying the atmosphere of the game, Nintendo Life felt the game did not translate to the Switch well visually, criticizing graphical issues such as pop-in and low visual clarity of locations and items. CGMagazine's Jordan Biordi criticized frequent bugs interrupting the atmosphere of the game.

Marcus Stewart, writing for Game Informer appreciated the game's world, remarking that he enjoyed "uncovering lore-building notes and clues". Stewart was more mixed on the game's story decisions, commenting that "They don't hurt the narrative, but the choices are boilerplate and feel tacked on." The Washington Post liked Mundaun's use of non-Euclidean geometry to confuse the player, appreciating its use of properties unique to video games as a medium for creating a feeling of disorientation. Nintendo World Report disliked how the player had to complete all the objectives in an area before moving on, feeling as if exploration was actively discouraged, even if it kept them on track.
