= Schwarcz =

Schwarcz is a surname. Notable people with the surname include:

- Joseph A. Schwarcz, Canadian chemist and writer
- June Schwarcz (1918–2015), American artist
- Mordechai Schwarcz (1914–1938), Czech-born Jewish police officer in Mandatory Palestine
- Steven L. Schwarcz, American lawyer
- Vera Schwarcz (born 1947), American sinologist

== See also ==
- Schwartz (disambiguation)
