= Schwarzhorn (Vals) =

Mountain in Switzerland

- Location within Switzerland

Highest point
- Elevation: 2,944 m (9,659 ft)
- Prominence: 104 m (341 ft)
- Parent peak: Faltschonhorn
- Coordinates: 46°36′27.6″N 9°6′23.5″E

Geography
- Location: Graubünden, Switzerland
- Parent range: Lepontine Alps

The Schwarzhorn is a mountain of the Swiss Lepontine Alps, located west of Vals in the canton of Graubünden. It lies on the range between the Lumnezia and the Valser Tal, south of the Faltschonhorn.
