= Morissen =

- Former municipality
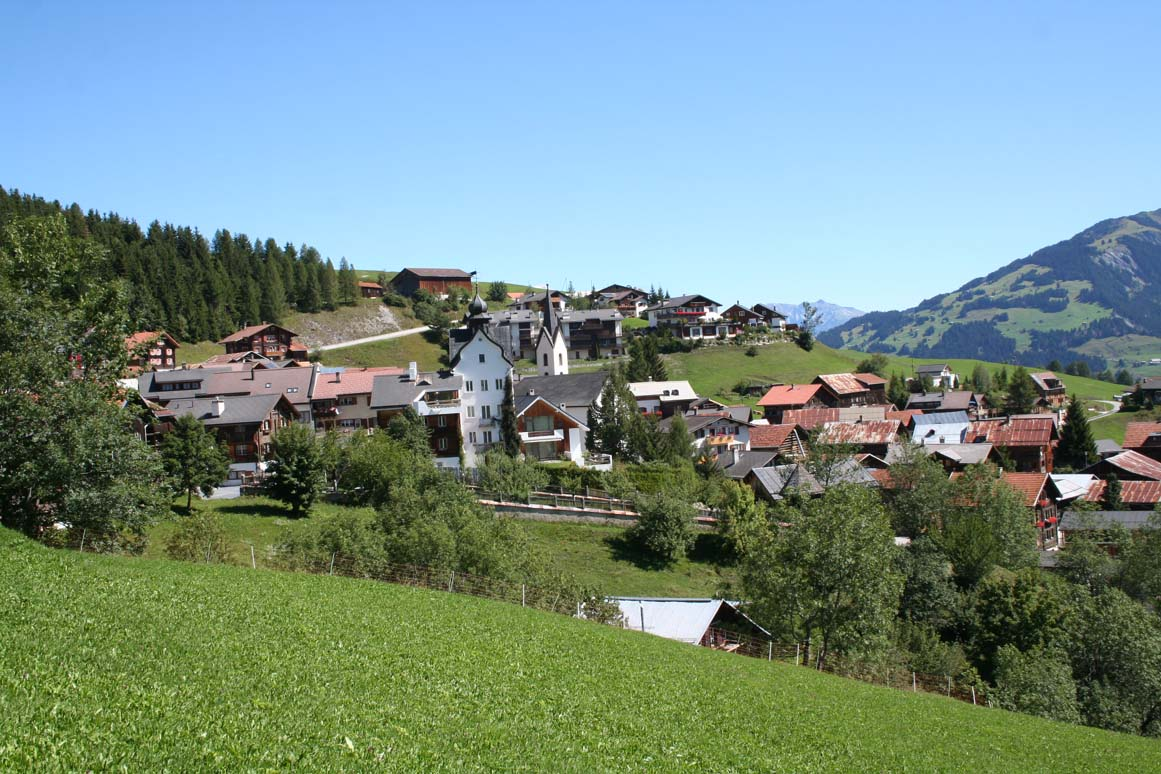

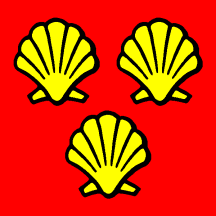
- Flag Coat of arms
- Location of Morissen
- Location within Switzerland Location within Canton of Graubünden
- Coordinates: 46°43′N 9°10′E
- Country: Switzerland
- Canton: Graubünden
- District: Surselva

Area
  - Total: 5.7 km^{2} (2.2 sq mi)
- Elevation: 1,337 m (4,386 ft)

Population (Dec 2011)
  - Total: 223
  - Density: 39/km^{2} (100/sq mi)
- Time zone: UTC+01:00 (CET)
  - Summer (DST): UTC+02:00 (CEST)
- Postal code: 7143
- SFOS number: 3596
- ISO 3166 code: CH-GR
- Surrounded by: Cumbel, Luven, Surcuolm, Vella
- Website: SFSO statistics

Morissen (Romansh: Murissen) is a former municipality in the district of Surselva in the Swiss canton of Graubünden. The municipalities of Cumbel, Degen, Lumbrein, Morissen, Suraua, Vignogn, Vella, and Vrin merged on 1 January 2013 into the new municipality of Lumnezia.

== History ==
Morissen is first mentioned in 1210 as Mureizens.

== Coat of arms ==
The municipal coat of arms is Gules three Escallops Or. The scallops on the coat of arms represent St. James the Elder who is the patron saint of the village church.

== Geography ==
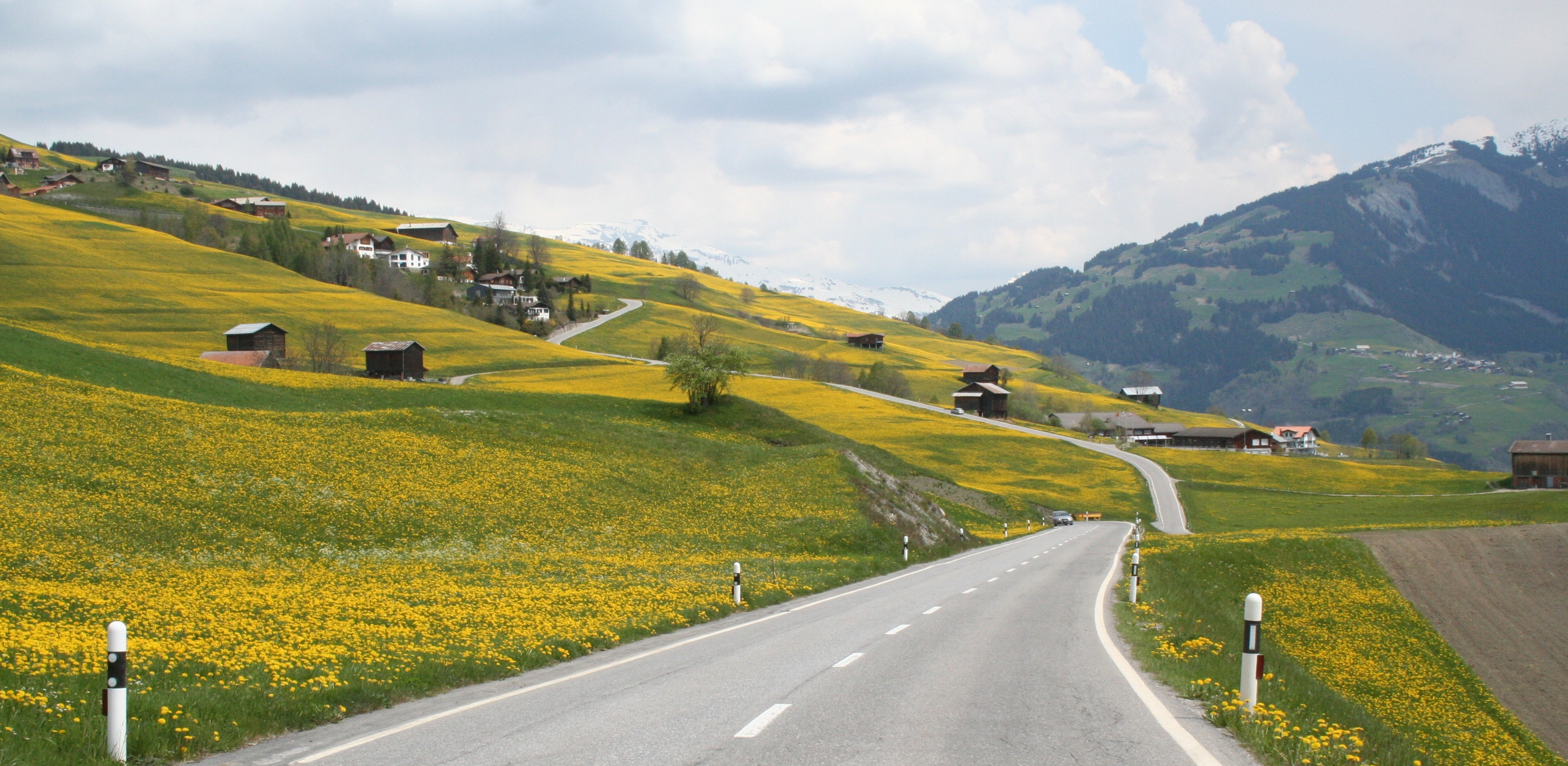
Val Lumnezia, looking north from Morissen

Morissen had an area, as of 2006, of 5.7 km^{2} (2.2 sq mi). Of this area, 86.8% is used for agricultural purposes, while 6.2% is forested. Of the rest of the land, 3.7% is settled (buildings or roads) and the remainder (3.3%) is non-productive (rivers, glaciers or mountains).

The former municipality is located in the Lugnez sub-district of the Surselva district on the southern foot of the Piz Mundaun and above the Lugnezerstrasse.

== Demographics ==
Morissen has a population (as of 2011) of 223. As of 2008, 2.5% of the population was made up of foreign nationals. Over the last 10 years the population has decreased at a rate of -10.3%. Most of the population (as of 2000) speaks Romansh(91.5%), with German being second most common ( 6.6%) and English being third ( 0.9%).

As of 2000, the gender distribution of the population was 50.0% male and 50.0% female. The age distribution, as of 2000, in Morissen is; 20 children or 9.5% of the population are between 0 and 9 years old and 29 teenagers or 13.7% are between 10 and 19. Of the adult population, 17 people or 8.1% of the population are between 20 and 29 years old. 33 people or 15.6% are between 30 and 39, 30 people or 14.2% are between 40 and 49, and 37 people or 17.5% are between 50 and 59. The senior population distribution is 17 people or 8.1% of the population are between 60 and 69 years old, 15 people or 7.1% are between 70 and 79, there are 13 people or 6.2% who are between 80 and 89.

In the 2007 federal election the most popular party was the CVP which received 67.3% of the vote. The next three most popular parties were the SVP (23.1%), the FDP (5.8%) and the SP (3.8%).

In Morissen about 59.9% of the population (between age 25-64) have completed either non-mandatory upper secondary education or additional higher education (either university or a Fachhochschule).

Morissen has an unemployment rate of 0.32%. As of 2005, there were 44 people employed in the primary economic sector and about 18 businesses involved in this sector. 5 people are employed in the secondary sector and there are 3 businesses in this sector. 8 people are employed in the tertiary sector, with 4 businesses in this sector.

The historical population is given in the following table:

| year | population |
|---|---|
| 1850 | 250 |
| 1900 | 163 |
| 1950 | 297 |
| 2000 | 211 |
