= Swartz Creek (disambiguation) =

Swartz Creek is a tributary of the Flint River.

Swartz Creek may also refer to:

- Swartz Creek, Michigan, a city in Genesee County, Michigan

== See also ==
- Swartz Creek Community Schools, a public school district in Genesee County, Michigan
- West Second Street–Swartz Creek Bridge
- Swartz (disambiguation)
- Schwartz (disambiguation)
