= Schwarz =

Schwarz may refer to:

- Schwarz, Germany, a municipality in Mecklenburg-Vorpommern, Germany
- Schwarz (surname), a surname (and list of people with the surname)
- Schwarz (musician), American DJ and producer
- Schwarz (Böhse Onkelz album), released simultaneously with Weiß, 1993
- Schwarz (Conrad Schnitzler album), a reissue of the 1971 Kluster album Eruption
- Schwarz (cards), in some card games, a Schneider (low point score) in which no tricks are taken
- Schwarz Gruppe, a multinational retail group
- Schwarz Pharma, a German drug company

== See also ==
- Schwartz (disambiguation)
- Schwarzhorn (disambiguation)
- Swartz (disambiguation)
