= Swartz =

Swartz may refer to:

Places

- Swartz, Louisiana
- Swartz Creek (disambiguation)
- Swartz Bay, British Columbia on the north end of the Saanich Peninsula on Vancouver Island
  - Swartz Bay Ferry Terminal
- Swartz Nunataks, in Antarctica

People

- Swartz (surname)

== See also ==
- Schwartz (disambiguation)
- Schwarz (disambiguation)
