= Faltschonhorn =

Mountain in Switzerland

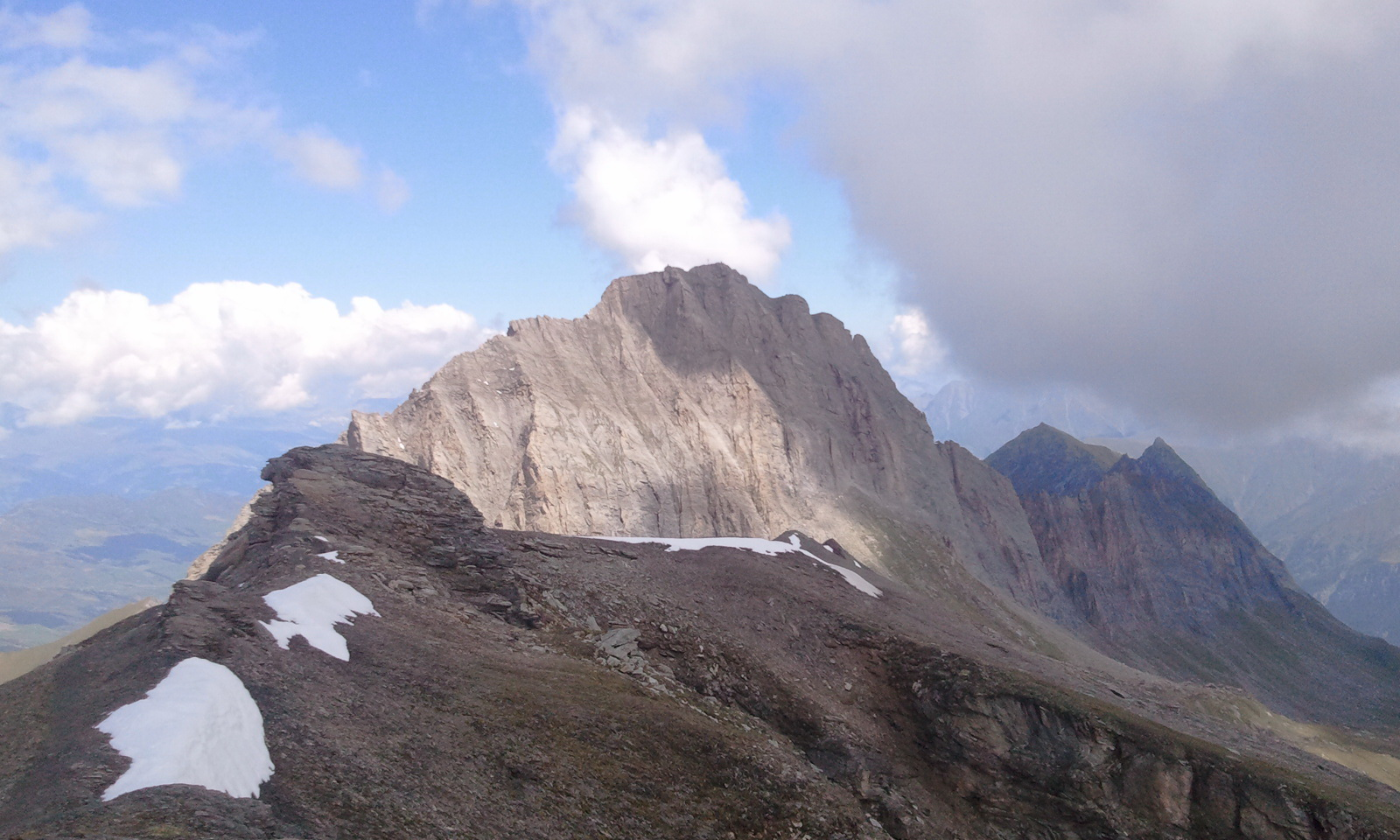
- View of Piz Aul from the summit

Highest point
- Elevation: 3,022 m (9,915 ft)
- Prominence: 249 m (817 ft)
- Parent peak: Piz Aul
- Coordinates: 46°36′45″N 9°6′53.5″E

Geography
- Location within Switzerland
- Location: Graubünden, Switzerland
- Parent range: Lepontine Alps

The Faltschonhorn is a mountain of the Swiss Lepontine Alps, located west of Vals in the canton of Graubünden. It lies on the range between the Val Lumnezia and the Valser Tal, south of Piz Aul.
