= Obersaxen =

- Municipality
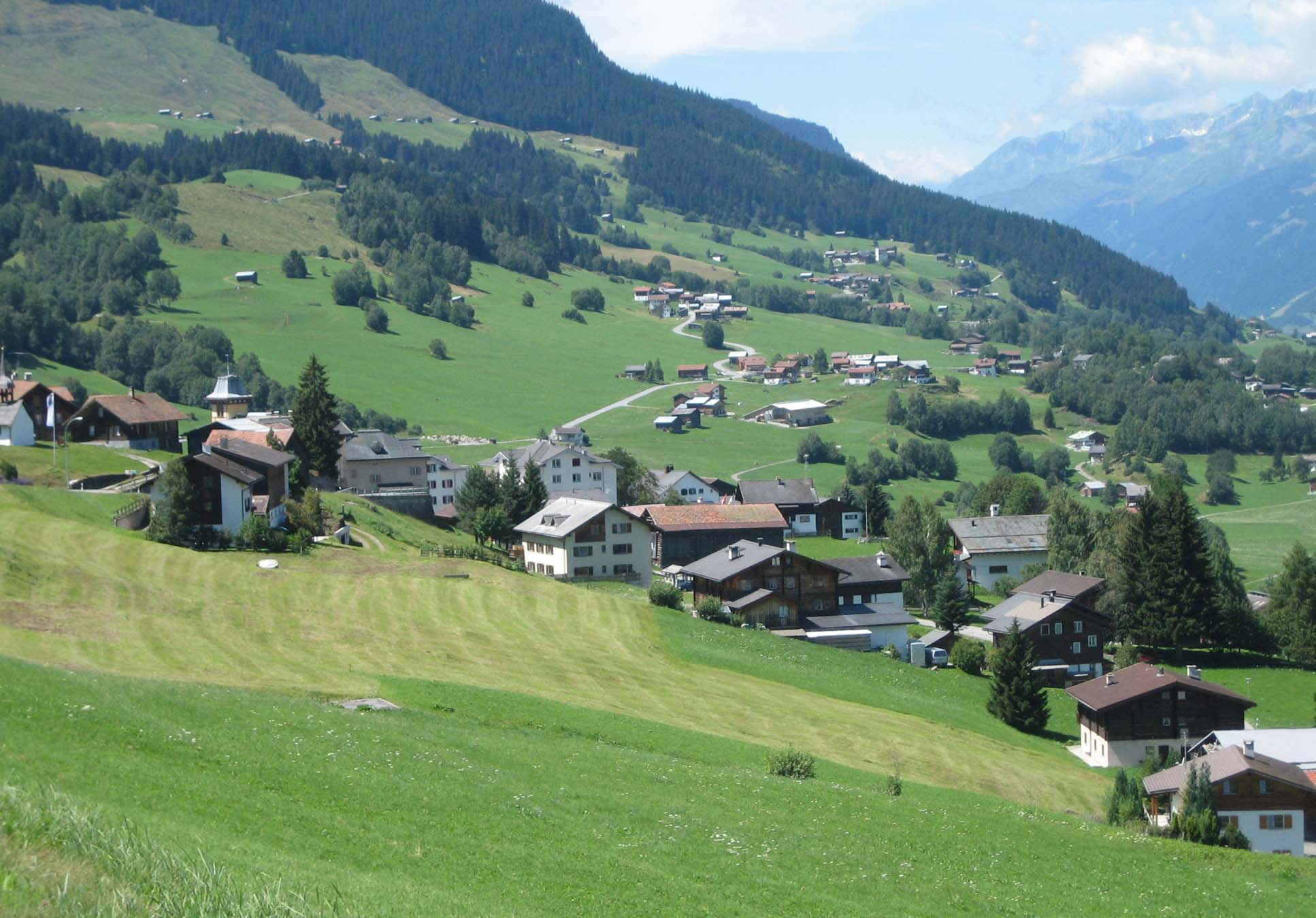

- Flag Coat of arms
- Location of Obersaxen
- Location within Switzerland Location within Canton of Graubünden
- Coordinates: 46°44′N 9°6′E
- Country: Switzerland
- Canton: Graubünden
- District: Surselva

Area
  - Total: 61.54 km^{2} (23.76 sq mi)
- Elevation (Meierhof): 1,281 m (4,203 ft)

Population (Dec 2014)
  - Total: 838
  - Density: 13.6/km^{2} (35.3/sq mi)
- Time zone: UTC+01:00 (CET)
  - Summer (DST): UTC+02:00 (CEST)
- Postal code: 7134
- SFOS number: 3612
- ISO 3166 code: CH-GR
- Localities: Obersaxen, Meierhof
- Surrounded by: Breil/Brigels, Degen, Flond, Lumbrein, Rueun, Sumvitg, Surcuolm, Trun, Vella, Vignogn, Waltensburg/Vuorz
- Website: www.obersaxenmundaun.swiss

Obersaxen (Romansh: Sursaissa) is a former municipality in the district of Surselva in the Swiss canton of Graubünden. On 1 January 2016 the former municipalities of Obersaxen and Mundaun merged to form the new municipality of Obersaxen Mundaun.

== History ==
Obersaxen is first mentioned in 765 as Supersaxa though this is from a copy which dates from later. In 956 it was mentioned as Supersaxa, and in 1227 as Ubersahse.

The current settlement was founded in the thirteenth century, when a group of German-speaking Walser settled the plateau. Right in the heart of the mainly Romansh-speaking Surselva (which encompasses the valley of the Vorderrhein, along with all of its side valleys, among others the Val Lumnezia), Obersaxen is an island of German-speakers.

== Geography ==
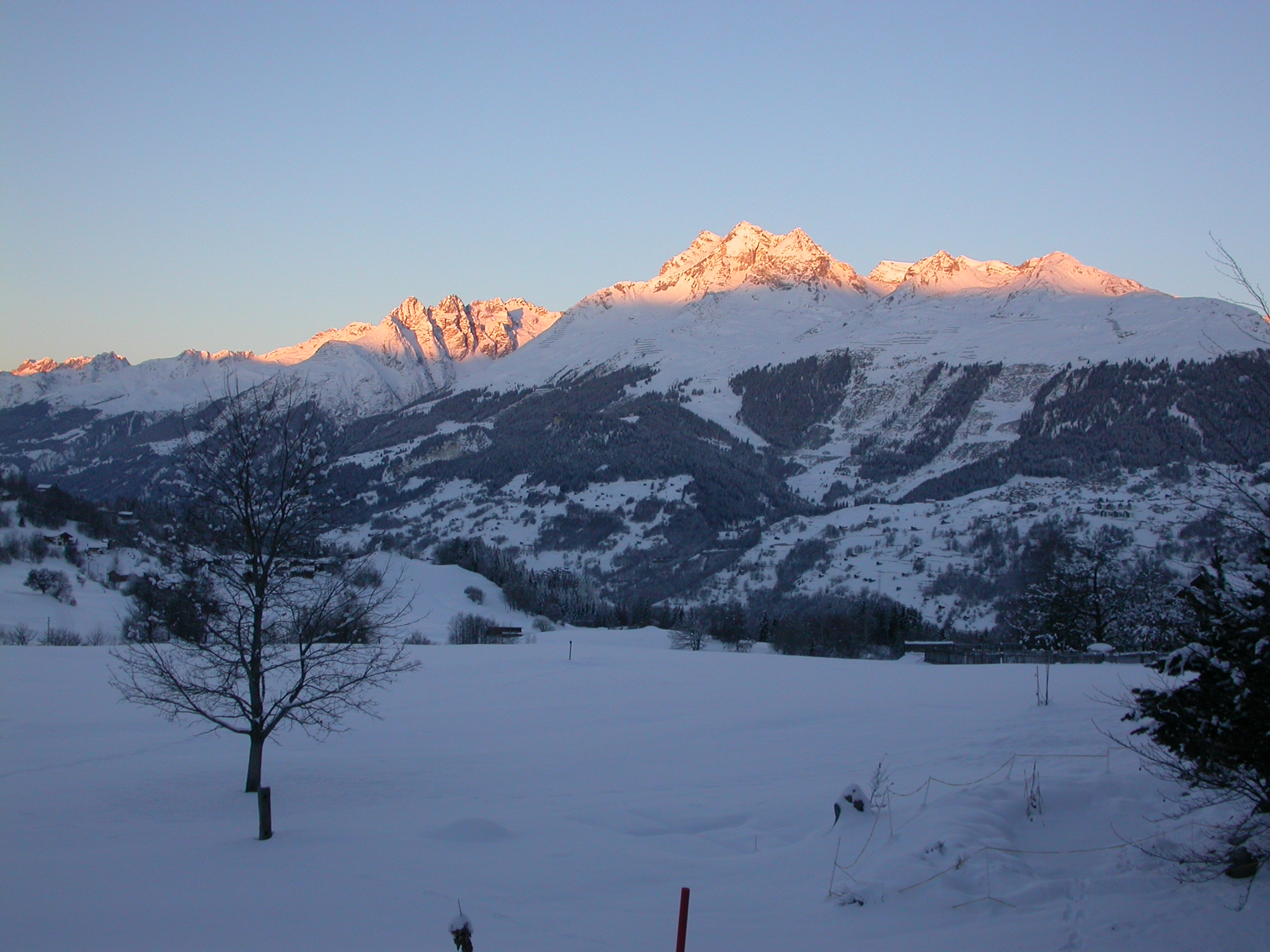
View over the Rhine Valley from Meierhof

Aerial view (1970)

Obersaxen had an area, as of 2006, of 61.5 km^{2} (23.7 sq mi). Of this area, 54.8% is used for agricultural purposes, while 23.4% is forested. Of the rest of the land, 2% is settled (buildings or roads) and the remainder (19.8%) is non-productive (rivers, glaciers or mountains).

The former municipality is located in the Rueun sub-district of the Surselva district. It is located on the northern face of the Mundaun mountain chain, on the right side of the Rhine valley. It consists of 28 settlements which are divided into five Pirten around the central village of Meierhof.

== Coat of arms ==
The municipal coat of arms' blazon is Per pale Gules a Key Or and Azure two Bars Argent. The right half of the coat of arms comes from the seal of the Freiherr of Rhäzüns, who acquired rights in Obersaxen through the Walser immigration. The key is a symbol of Saint Peter which was on the 14th Century village seal.

== Demographics ==
Obersaxen had a population (as of 2014) of 838. As of 2008, 6.6% of the population was made up of foreign nationals. Over the last 10 years the population has decreased at a rate of -4.9%. Most of the population (as of 2000) speaks German (89.3%), with Romansh being second most common (5.0%) and Portuguese being third (3.7%). The language spoken here is a very distinctive form of Swiss German.

As of 2000, the gender distribution of the population was 49.3% male and 50.7% female. The age distribution, as of 2000, in Obersaxen is; 88 children or 11.3% of the population are between 0 and 9 years old and 108 teenagers or 13.9% are between 10 and 19. Of the adult population, 65 people or 8.3% of the population are between 20 and 29 years old. 130 people or 16.7% are between 30 and 39, 131 people or 16.8% are between 40 and 49, and 92 people or 11.8% are between 50 and 59. The senior population distribution is 70 people or 9.0% of the population are between 60 and 69 years old, 62 people or 8.0% are between 70 and 79, there are 31 people or 4.0% who are between 80 and 89, and there are 2 people or 0.3% who are between 90 and 99.

In the 2007 federal election the most popular party was the CVP which received 49.5% of the vote. The next three most popular parties were the SVP (25.8%), the FDP (12%) and the SP (11.4%).

In Obersaxen about 64.9% of the population (between age 25-64) have completed either non-mandatory upper secondary education or additional higher education (either university or a Fachhochschule).

Obersaxen has an unemployment rate of 0.71%. As of 2005, there were 98 people employed in the primary economic sector and about 47 businesses involved in this sector. 81 people are employed in the secondary sector and there are 11 businesses in this sector. 171 people are employed in the tertiary sector, with 42 businesses in this sector.

The historical population is given in the following table:

year	population
1850	830
1900	652
1910	636
1950	705
2000	779

== Sport ==
Obersaxen is a relatively large, but not particularly well-known ski resort. Despite the fact that it's quite close to the internationally popular resort of Flims-Laax, it is quite popular among locals and others who are "in-the-know", due to the quality of skiing and lack of the large crowds that are to be found in Flims. Obersaxen is also home to 2010 overall alpine skiing World Cup & Olympic champion Carlo Janka.
