= Lumnezia =

- Municipality
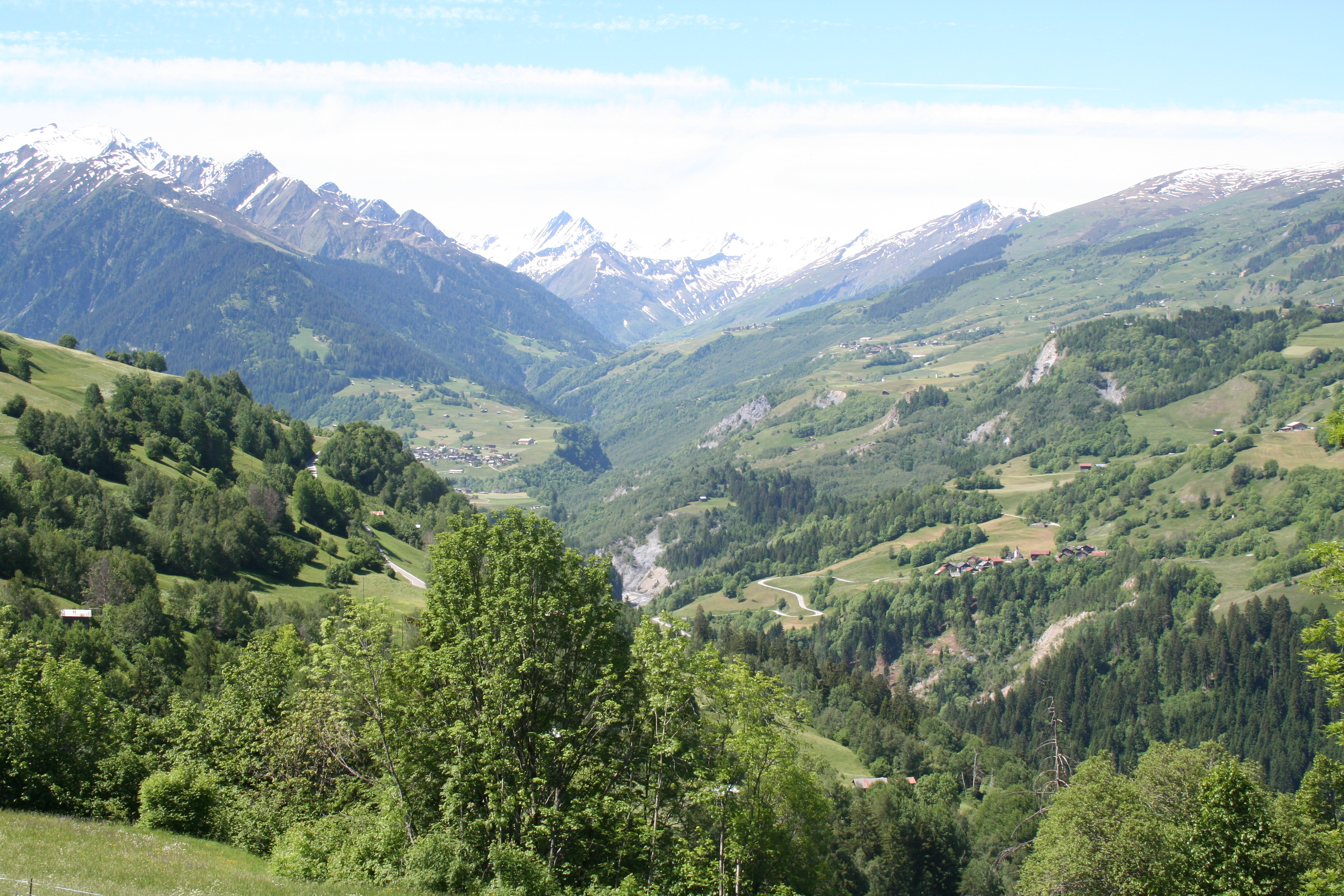
- Lumnezia

- Flag Coat of arms
- Location of Lumnezia
- Location within Switzerland Location within Canton of Grisons
- Coordinates: 46°43′N 9°11′E
- Country: Switzerland
- Canton: Grisons
- District: Surselva

Area
  - Total: 4.46 km^{2} (1.72 sq mi)

Population (Dec 2015)
  - Total: 2,150
  - Density: 482/km^{2} (1,250/sq mi)
- Time zone: UTC+01:00 (CET)
  - Summer (DST): UTC+02:00 (CEST)
- Postal code: 7142
- SFOS number: 3618
- ISO 3166 code: CH-GR
- Localities: Peiden, Uors, Camuns, Tersnaus, Surcasti, Cumbel, Vella, Morissen, Vattis, Degen, Vignogn, Lumbrein, Vrin, Cons
- Surrounded by: Vals, Ilanz/Glion, Obersaxen Mundaun, Sumvitg, Medel, Blenio
- Website: http://www.lumnezia.ch

Lumnezia is a valley region and a municipality in the Surselva Region in the Swiss of canton of the Grisons. The former municipalities of Cumbel, Degen, Lumbrein, Morissen, Suraua, Vignogn, Vella, and Vrin merged on 1 January 2013 into the new municipality of Lumnezia. It covers the Val Lumnezia (German: Lugnez), a Swiss high alpine valley. Its upper regions are among the most remote areas in the Swiss Alps. The official language is Romansh.

In 1998, the village of Vrin was awarded the Wakker Prize for the preservation of its architectural heritage.

== History ==
=== Neolithic and Megalithic Period ===
In the Neolithic times the valley was probably inhabited by Chalcolithic (Copper Age) Europeans. Witness to this is the Crap da Treis Siarps, the "Three Snakes Stone", a remnant of a Neolithic or Bronze Age Megalithic monument. It can be found at the slope of the Glogn gorge east of the Parish church of Pleif. Although the other megaliths of this monument have substantially weathered, the "Three Snakes Stone" is well preserved. It has three snakes and a half moon engraved, hinting at its use as either a burial site or as an archaeoastronomical site.

=== Roman Times ===
During Roman times Lumnezia was probably inhabited by a Celtic tribe known as the Helvetii. It was a part of the Roman Province of Rhaetia. However, as there were hardly any natural resources in the valley and the alpine crossing into the Ticino would have been difficult, there are no significant archaeological finds of this period.

=== Middle Ages ===
Chronicles of the early Middle Ages mention the Lumnezia because of its fertile soils and advantageous climate. In several sheltered parishes, such as Peiden peaches and grapes were grown. In the 6th century AD the parish church at Pleif near Vella was built. At about this time the valley became a domain of Bishopric Chur, with its inhabitants living in serfdom to the bishops at Chur. At around 1,200 AD the Valser Valley, a side valley of the Val Lumnezia, was settled by an Alemannic tribe known as the Walsers. With the foundation of the Grey League in the 14th century, the valley emancipated itself politically.

=== Reformation and Enlightenment ===
1538 AD the citizens of the Val Lumnezia bought themselves off the feudal ownership. The parishes of the valley became autonomous and the feudal domains became partially private property. Within the Grey League legislatives and juridical councils emerged in the form of confederations comprising several parish councils — one of which became the municipality Lumnezia. This had, in particular, economical advantages, as the valley was then autonomous, being able to supply itself with food and goods. Across the Greina high plain, the cattle trade was done with cities as far afield as Milan in Italy. As a bastion against the emerging Protestantism which has spread across Northern and Western Switzerland, the Holy See established 1621 AD a Rhaetian Capuchin congregation to spread the Counter-Reformation across the Val Lumnezia. This had the effect, that still today, the valley is conservative Roman Catholic, with sacred buildings, such as baroque churches dominating the landscape.

=== Industrial Age ===
The construction of the road to Ilanz for stagecoaches in 1890 connected the Lumnezia to the infrastructure of the Vorderrhein valley and the Swiss railway network.

=== Cumbel ===
Cumbel is first mentioned about 825 as Cumble. Until 1983, the municipality was officially known as Cumbels.

=== Degen ===
Degen is first mentioned about 840 as Higenae/Egenae. Rumein was mentioned at about the same time as villa Ramnensis, and in 1325 Vattiz was mentioned as Vatigis.

=== Lumbrein ===
The Crestaulta hill near the hamlet of Surin was occupied since at least the early Bronze Age (c. 2000-1700/1600 BC). However, Lumbrein is first mentioned about 850 as in villa Lamarine though this comes from a 16th-century copy of an earlier and now lost document. In 1231 it was mentioned as de Lumarins.

=== Morissen ===
Morissen is first mentioned in 1210 as Mureizens.

=== Suraua ===
The municipality was formed on 1 January 2002 through the merger of Camuns, Surcasti, Tersnaus, and Uors-Peiden. Camuns is first mentioned in 1543 as Gamundtz. Surcasti is first mentioned in 1515 as Oberkastels and until 1943 it was known by its German name of Obercastels. Tersnaus is first mentioned in 1362 as Terzenaus. Uors was first mentioned in 831 as villa Vorce, and in 1290 as Furze. Peiden was first mentioned in 1345 as Pedens.

=== Vignogn ===
Vignogn is first mentioned in 1325 as Vinanne. In 1469 it was mentioned as Viends.

=== Vella ===
While there is some evidence of a late Bronze Age settlement and coins from the 3rd and 4th centuries have been found, Vella is first mentioned about 840 as ad sanctum Vincentium [...] in valle Leguntia. In 1290-98 it was mentioned as ad Ville, aput Villam. The village church was the center of a parish that covered the entire valley. However, about 1300 Vals separated from the parish due to the desire of Walser German speaking Walser immigrants to have their own religious leadership. Over the following centuries, most of the other villages in the valley also separated from the Vella parish (the most recent being Peiden in 1910). Due to the village's function as a religious center and the power of a local patrician family, de Mont, Vella grew to be the most powerful village in the valley. Since 1887, it has been home to the sub-district secondary school.

=== Vrin ===
Vrin is first mentioned in 1208 as Varin.

== Geography ==
After the 2013 merger Lumnezia had an area of 165.48 km^{2} (63.89 sq mi). Before the merger Lumnezia had an area, (as of the 2004/09 survey) of 165.43 square kilometers (63.87 sq mi). Of this area, about 44.8% is used for agricultural purposes, while 21.7% is forested. Of the rest of the land, 1.4% is settled (buildings or roads) and 32.0% is unproductive land. Over the past two decades (1979/85-2004/09) the amount of land that is settled has increased by 46 ha (110 acres) and the agricultural land has decreased by 385 ha (950 acres).

=== Geology ===
==== Tectonics and rock formations ====
The rock formations in the Val Lumnezia are mostly composed of slate — geologically known as the Grisons slate belt — which forms the mountains and valleys south of the Vorderrhein. The slate is interbedded with dolomite and quartzite. The Greina high Alpine plain distinguishes itself from the remainder of the Val Lumnezia by the occurrence of crystallite rock formations, characteristic of the Adula Alps. As several tectonic faults have fractured the original rock formations, the geological origin of the Grisons slate is unknown, but it is probably sediment of the thickness of some 100 metres (330 ft), which has formed during the Jurassic Period in estuaries. There are two types of slate in the Val Lumnezia: North of the river Glogn the slate of the Adula Alps predominates, whereas South of the river Glogn the Lugnez slate can be found. (These strata run with an inclination of 75° towards the North West). The former has weathered substantially, the latter is more resistant. The most cohesive slate mass stretches across and area of approximately 16 square miles (41 km^{2}). South of this massive slate plate, again the rock formations show substantial tectonic disruptions.

==== Glaciers ====
The current geological morphology of the Val Lumnezia is due to the last widespread glaciation some 26,000 until 13,000 years ago, when the entire valley was covered by a giant glacier. The glacier swept the deposits in the direction of the Vorderrhein and when it melted, an undulating sheet of clay and gravel remained, which forms today's terraced plateaus of Lumnezia.

The Piz Terri and the high Greina plain form a Nature reserve shared between Grisons and Ticino. The Kar Glacier below the Piz Terri has seen a substantial reduction due to global warming. Back in 1865 the glacier filled the area of the entire Lake Kar. This has resulted in massive erosion as the permafrost ground thawed releasing rocks and gravel which has formed a massive landslide below the Piz Terri. Other landslides have covered the remaining Glacier.

=== River systems ===
During snow melt and flash floods the river Glogn tends to flush away the slopes of its gorge resulting in the 1920s in the near evacuation of the Parish council Peiden on the northern site of the Glogn. However, the construction of several reservoirs and drainage systems along its path has alleviated this danger. Several streams emerging from the surrounding mountain ridges have cut small, but partially deep ravines and gullies into the terraced plateaus of the Val Lumnezia.

=== Ecology ===
==== Fauna ====
The fauna can be divided between high Alpine fauna and low Alpine fauna. At heights above 1,500 m (4,900 ft) in the Val Lumnezia the marmot and the chamois are of common occurrence and the Alpine ibex can be seen occasionally. Below that altitude, foxes, hares, wild boars and red deer can be found. With the onset of winter, the chamois move towards the valley. As there is a brown bear sanctuary some Alpine valleys further to the east, in Trentino of Italy, it might occasionally happen that a bear from this sanctuary ventures through lower ranges of the Val Lumnezia. Some caves and buildings of the lower Val Lumnezia are inhabited by the horseshoe bat (Rhinolophidae), which is a protected species.

In the higher and middle ranges of the valley several pairs of golden eagles have been resettled.

== Transport ==
=== Airports ===
Both the international airports at Zürich-Kloten and Milan Malpensa are about equidistant from the Lumnezia.

=== Railways ===
The Railway station is located at Ilanz/Glion in the valley of the Rein Anteriur. The Rhaetian Railway line to Disentis/Mustér serves the valley, with connecting services to the Swiss Federal Railways network at Chur. In addition, Ilanz is a stop for the famous Glacier Express.

=== Roads ===
The Lumnezia can be accessed only by the Via Principala road from Ilanz. Arriving from Zürich and Chur, respectively, the Swiss Federal Highways A3 and A13(E43) to the San Bernardino road tunnel have to be left at the intersection Reichenau. The Swiss National Road 19 is to be followed to Ilanz. From here the Lumnezia can be reached taking the Via Principala past Cumbel into Vella or Vals. Arriving from Milan the Lumnezia can be reached leaving the A13(E43) at the intersection Reichenau. Arriving from Geneva, Lumnezia can be reached via the Swiss Federal Highways A1 and A9 (E62) taking the Furka Pass road, the Swiss Federal Road 19, passing the Furka pass and the Oberalp Pass to Disentis. At Ilanz, the Swiss Federal Road 19 has to be left for the Via Prinzipala.

== Demographics ==
=== Population ===
Lumnezia has a population (as of December 2020) of 1,996. As of 2013, 3.6% of the population are resident foreign nationals. Over the last 3 years (2010-2013) the population has changed at a rate of -4.42%. The birth rate in the municipality, in 2013, was 3.8 while the death rate was 16.0 per thousand residents.

As of 2013, children and teenagers (0–19 years old) make up 16.5% of the population, while adults (20–64 years old) are 58.0% and seniors (over 64 years old) make up 25.5%.

=== Employment ===
As of 2012, there were a total of 944 people employed in the municipality. Of these, a total of 300 people worked in 126 businesses in the primary economic sector. The secondary sector employed 203 workers in 45 separate businesses. Finally, the tertiary sector provided 441 jobs in 116 businesses. In 2013 a total of 31.3% of the population received social assistance.

=== Historic Population ===
The historical population is given in the following chart:

== Tourism ==
=== Skiing ===
There are two main skiing areas in the Lumnezia. The Piz Mundaun and the Piz Aul in the Valser Valley.

There are various ski-lifts on the northern face of the valley, connecting the Lumnezia to the Obersaxen ski area.

== Sites of Interest ==
=== Mountains ===
- Piz Terri
- Piz Aul
- Piz Mundaun

=== Nature ===
- Glenner Gorge
- Alpine Forests
- Lake Kar

=== Heritage sites of national significance ===
The Chapel of St. Sebastian in Degen, the Crestaulta and Cresta Petschna (a Bronze Age settlement), the necropolis at Surin and the double house at number 30 in Lumbrien, the Church of S. Luregn/St. Lorenzare in Suraua, the Church of S. Vincenz/St. Vincent in Vella and the Church of S. Maria in Vrin are listed as a Swiss heritage site of national significance.

Crestaulta is a significant Bronze Age site on a hill about 300 m (980 ft) west of Surin. It was discovered in 1935 and excavated by Walo Burkart in 1935-38. Three settlement phases were discovered. The bottom layer dates from the early Bronze Age (c. 2000-1700/1600 BC) and included a number of post holes for simple huts with some attached animal stalls. The hut was about 6.5 by 4 meters (21 by 13 ft). The second layer dates from the middle Bronze Age (1700/1600-1500/1400 BC) and consists of massive dry stone walls, however there are no clear house or other building foundations. This layer also includes numerous animal stalls, a small round "cellar", part of a kiln and fire pits. The upper layer is also from the middle Bronze Age (1500/1400-1300 BC) and includes an animal stall, a menhir or standing stone and a wooden floor. Additional excavations have discovered ceramic pots of a style that is now known as the Inner-alpine Bronze Age culture (German: Inneralpinen Bronzezeit-Kultur) or formerly as the Crestaulta-Kultur.

In the river Cresta Petschna, about 150 m (490 ft) from Crestaulta a cemetery or necropolis was discovered in 1947. It included at least 11 early Bronze Age graves. The items buried in the graves (sewing needles, pendants and arm rings) indicate that these were women's graves.

The tower dates to the 12th century, and is first mentioned in 1253 as the property of the Freiherr von Überkastel. At that time it was the castle of the Überkastel family. When the family died out in the 15th century, the tower was used as a church tower for the Church of S. Luregn/St. Lorenz. Records of the church have been found from 1345, 1515 and 1520. The gothic church was consecrated in 1520. In 1774 it was rebuilt in a baroque style which remains today. During the restoration, a valuable madonna statue was discovered, which is now in the museum at Disentis Abbey.

The Church of St. Vincent is first mentioned about 843, when it was given Imperial support. It later came under the patronage of the Welfs and in the mid 10th century came under the authority of the cathedral of Constance. By the 14th century it was owned by the Freiherr of Belmont, but in 1371 was inherited by the family of Sax-Misox. Then, in 1483 it came under the authority of the Bishop of Chur. The Gothic/Romanesque church was rebuilt in 1661-62.

The Church of the Immaculate Conception (St. Maria) and John the Baptist was consecrated in 1345. Until 1597 it was a chapel under the authority of the parish church of St. Vincenz in Pleif (part of the municipality of Vella).

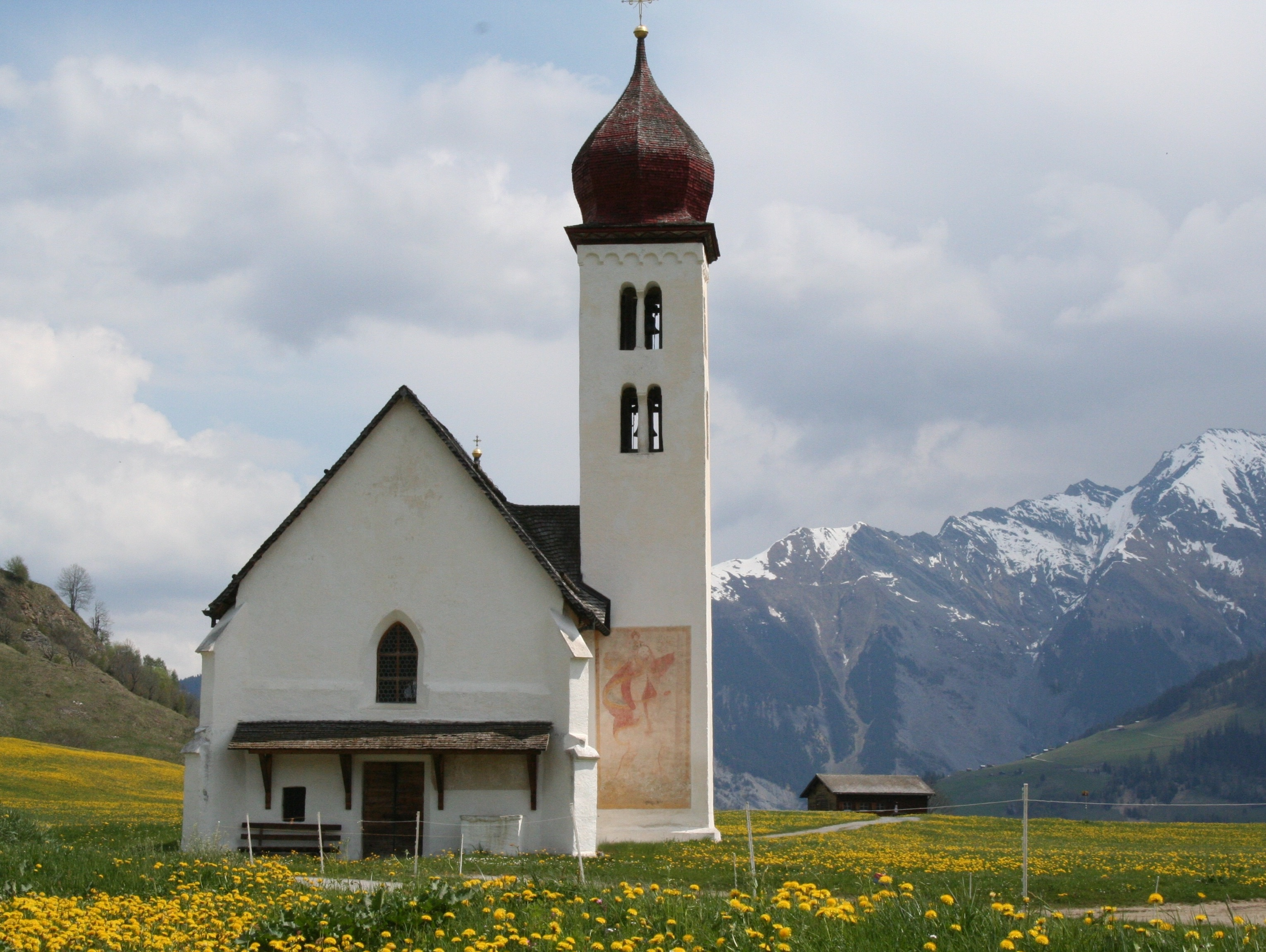
Chapel of St. Sebastian

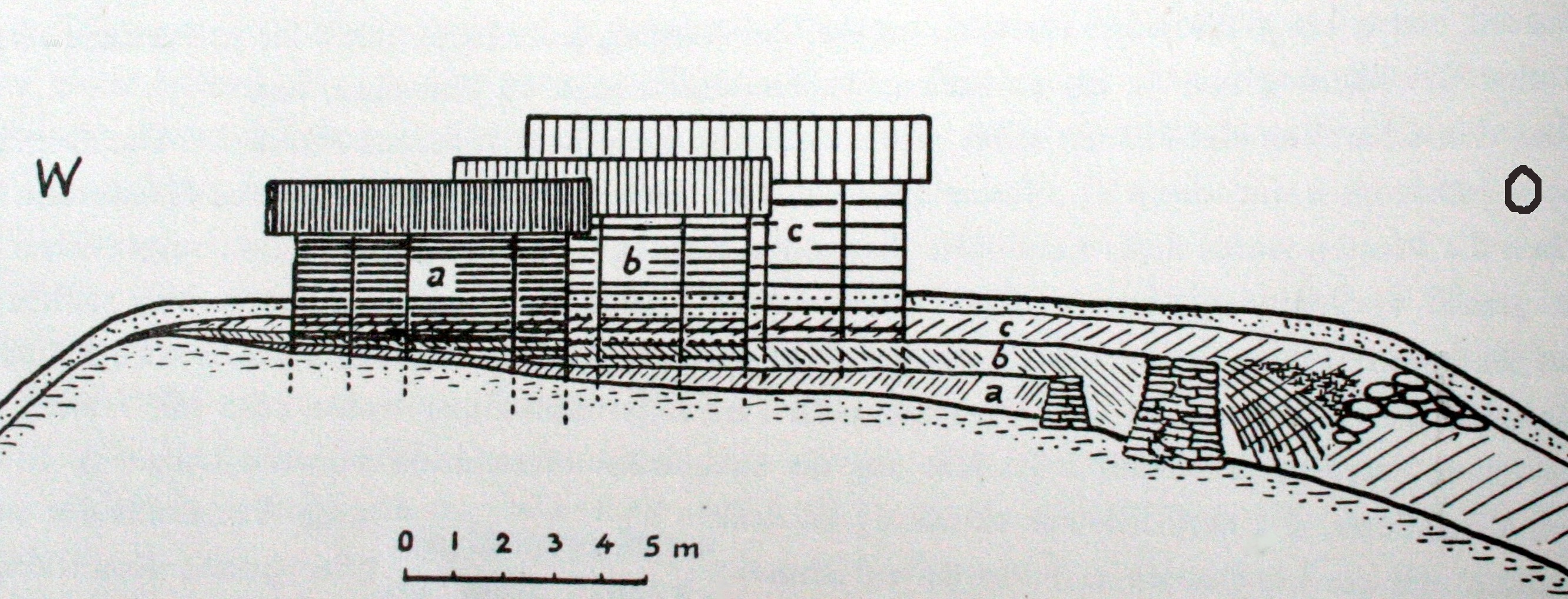
Buildings on the Crestaulta

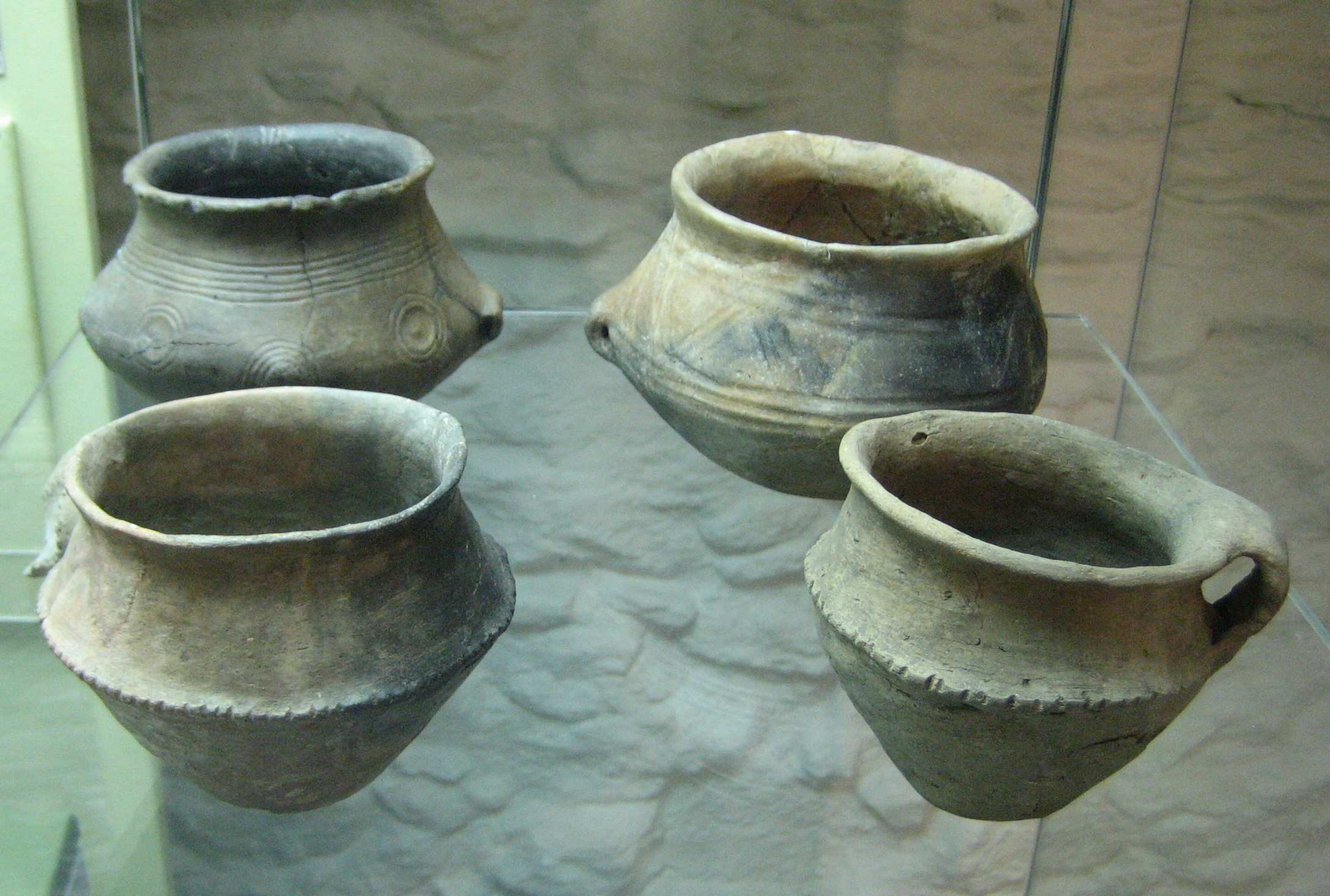
Ceramics from Crestaulta

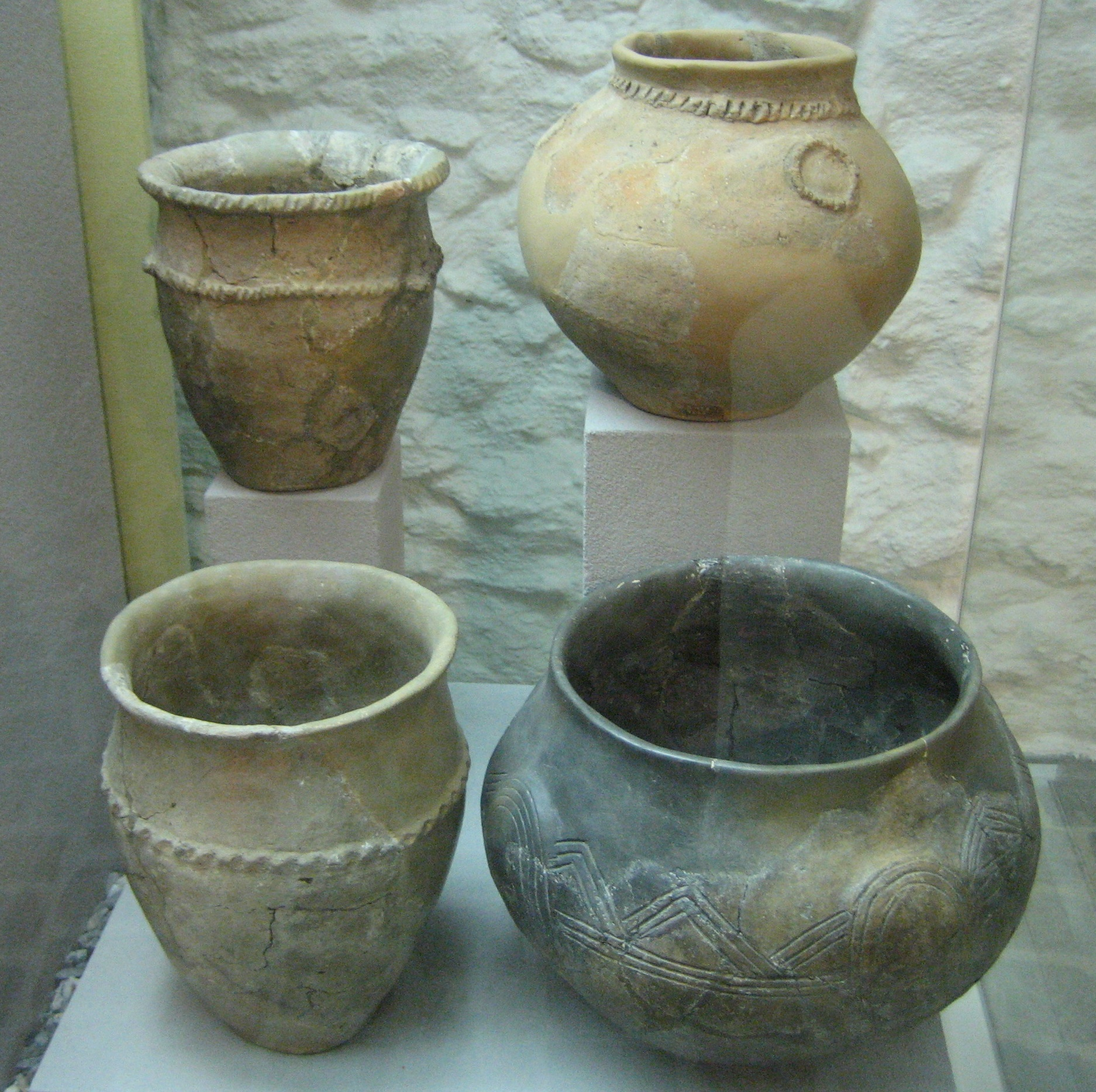
Ceramics from Crestaulta

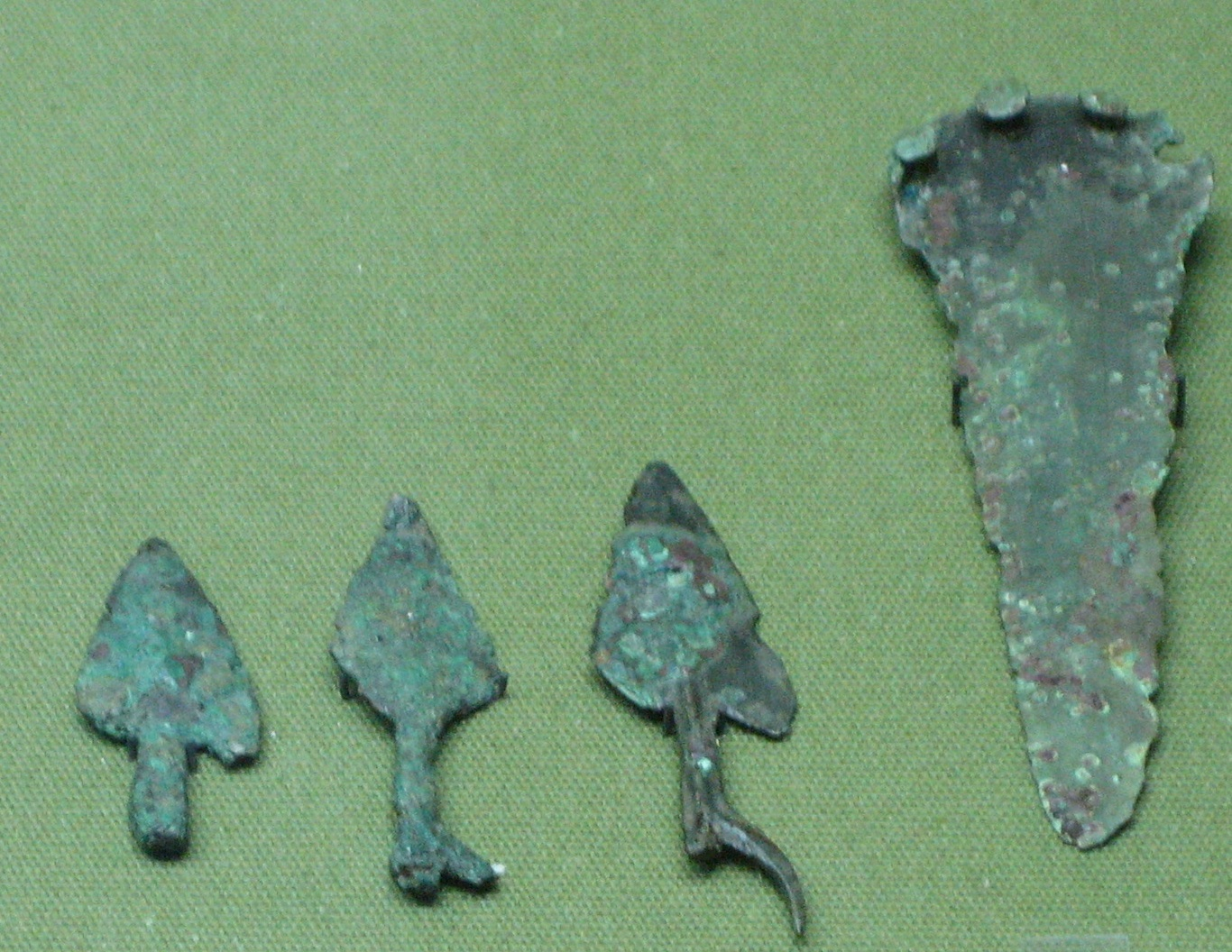
Spearheads from Crestaulta

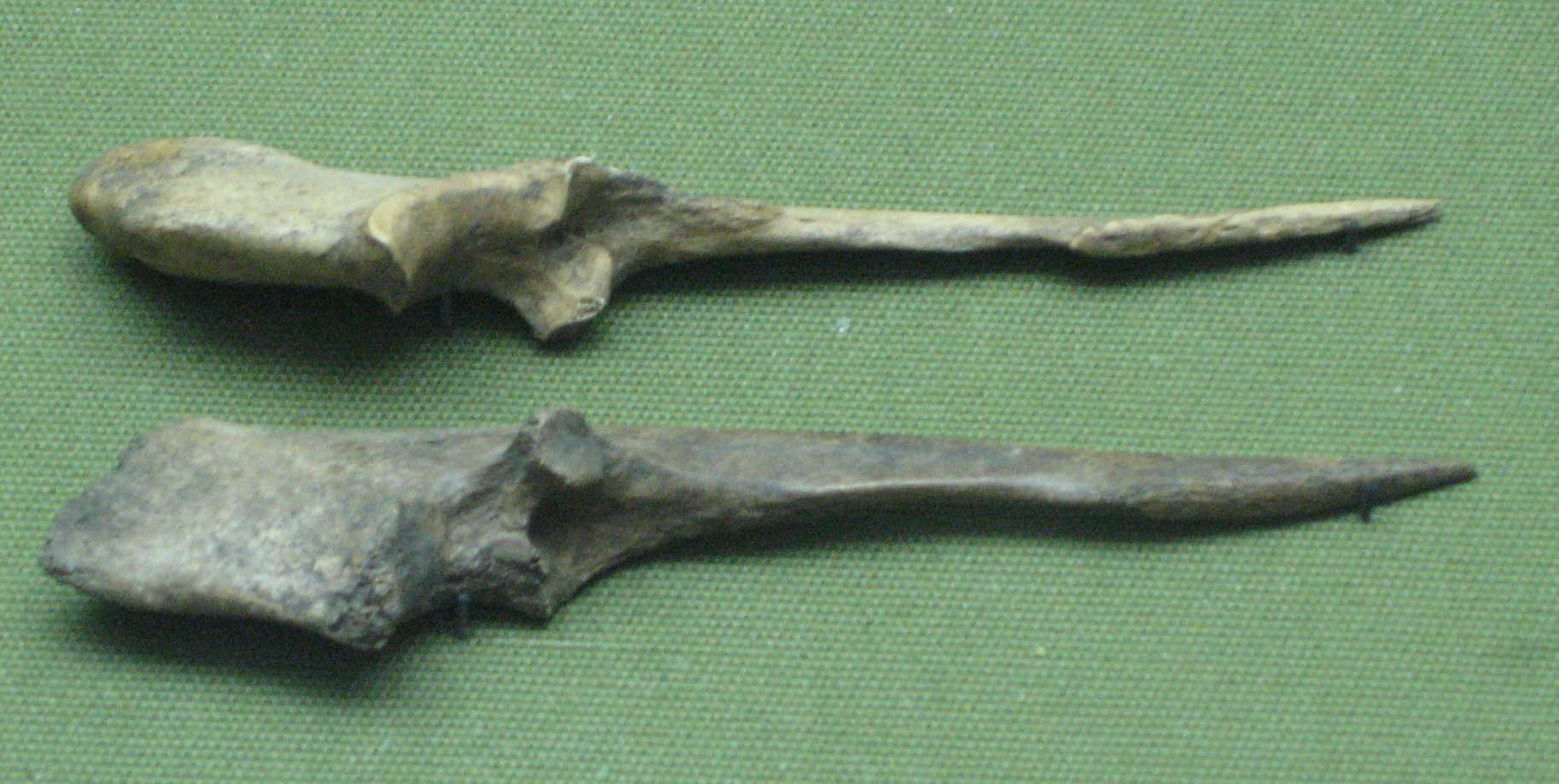
Needles from Crestaulta

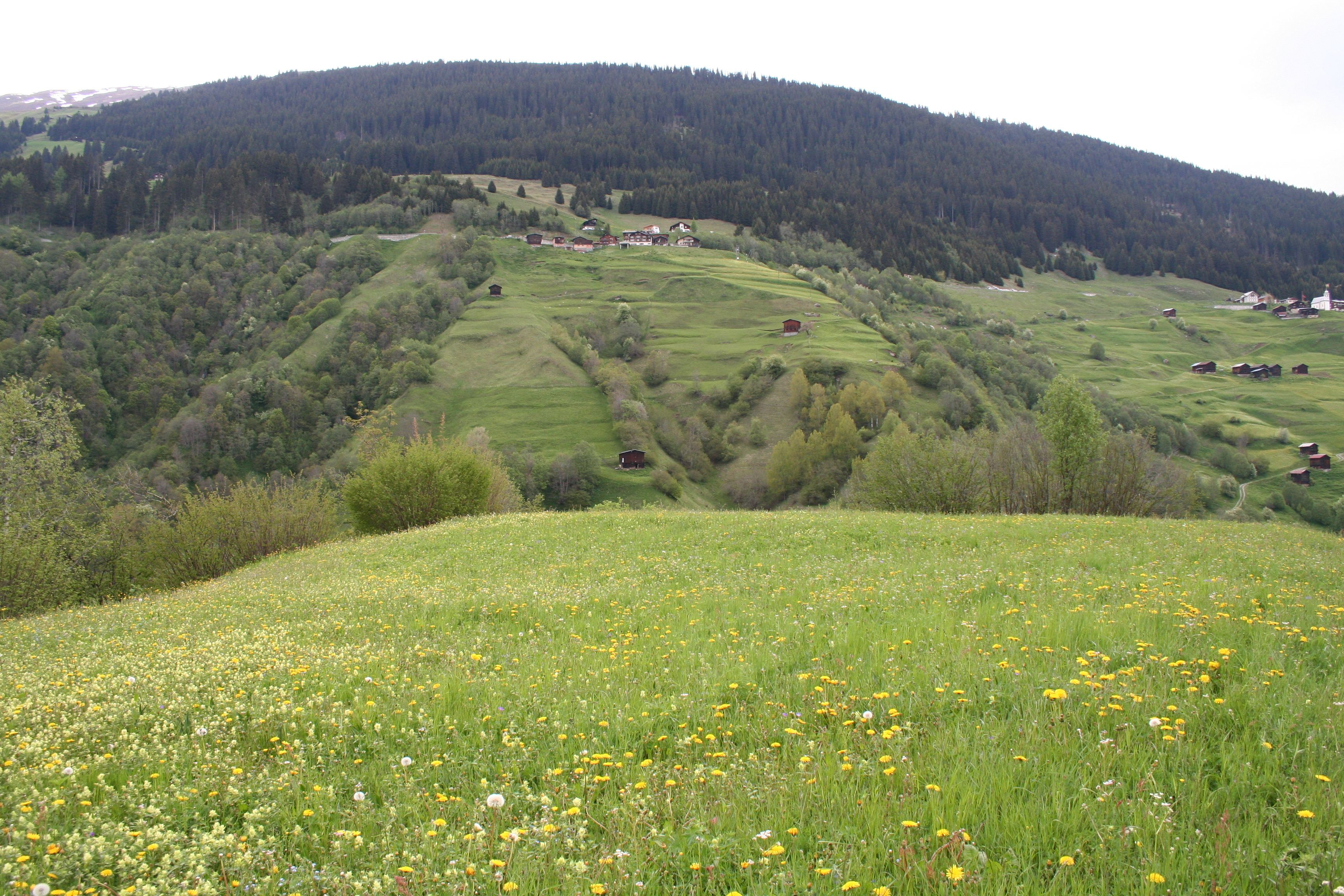
Crestaulta site

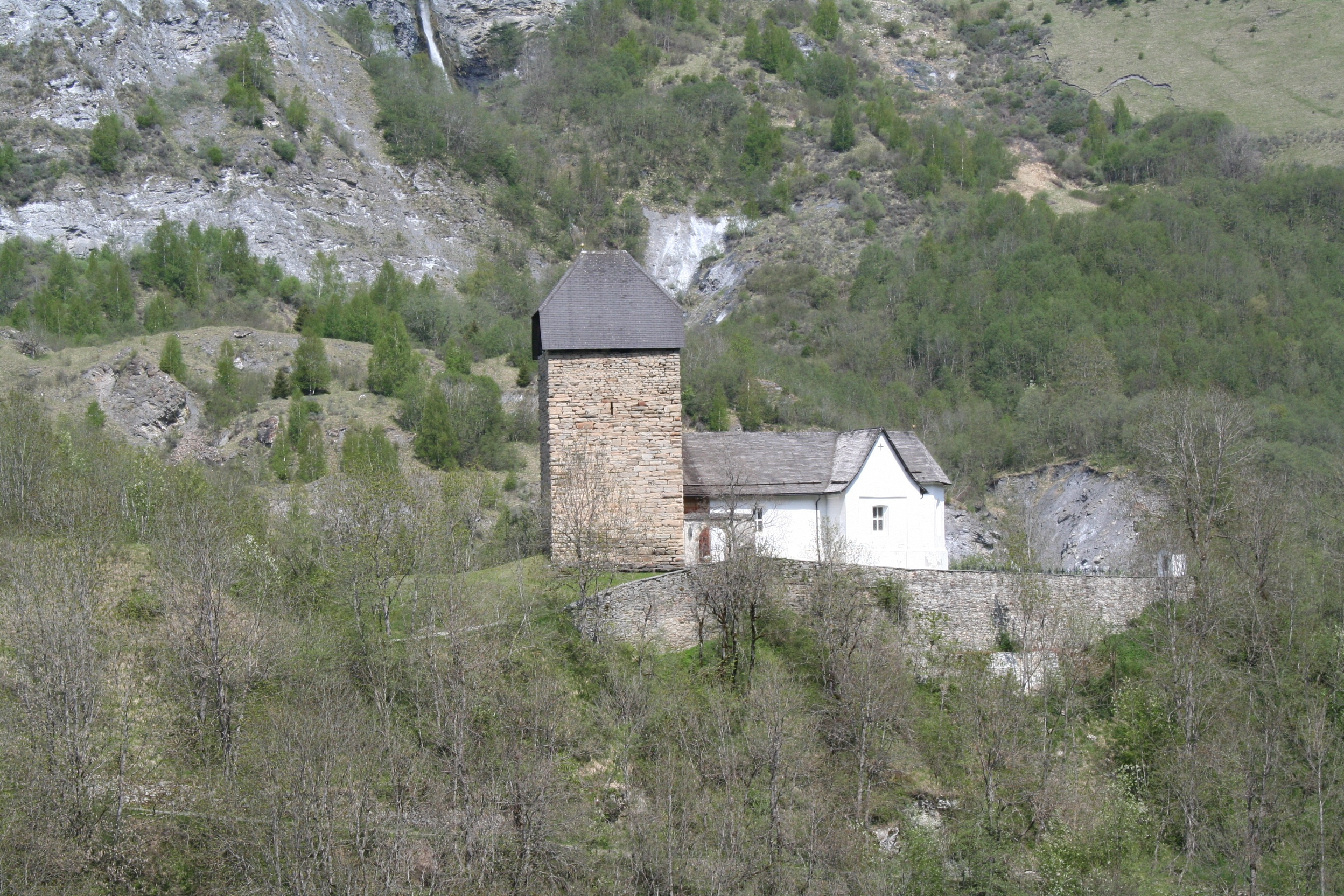
Formerly castle Surcasti, now Church of S. Luregn/St. Lorenz

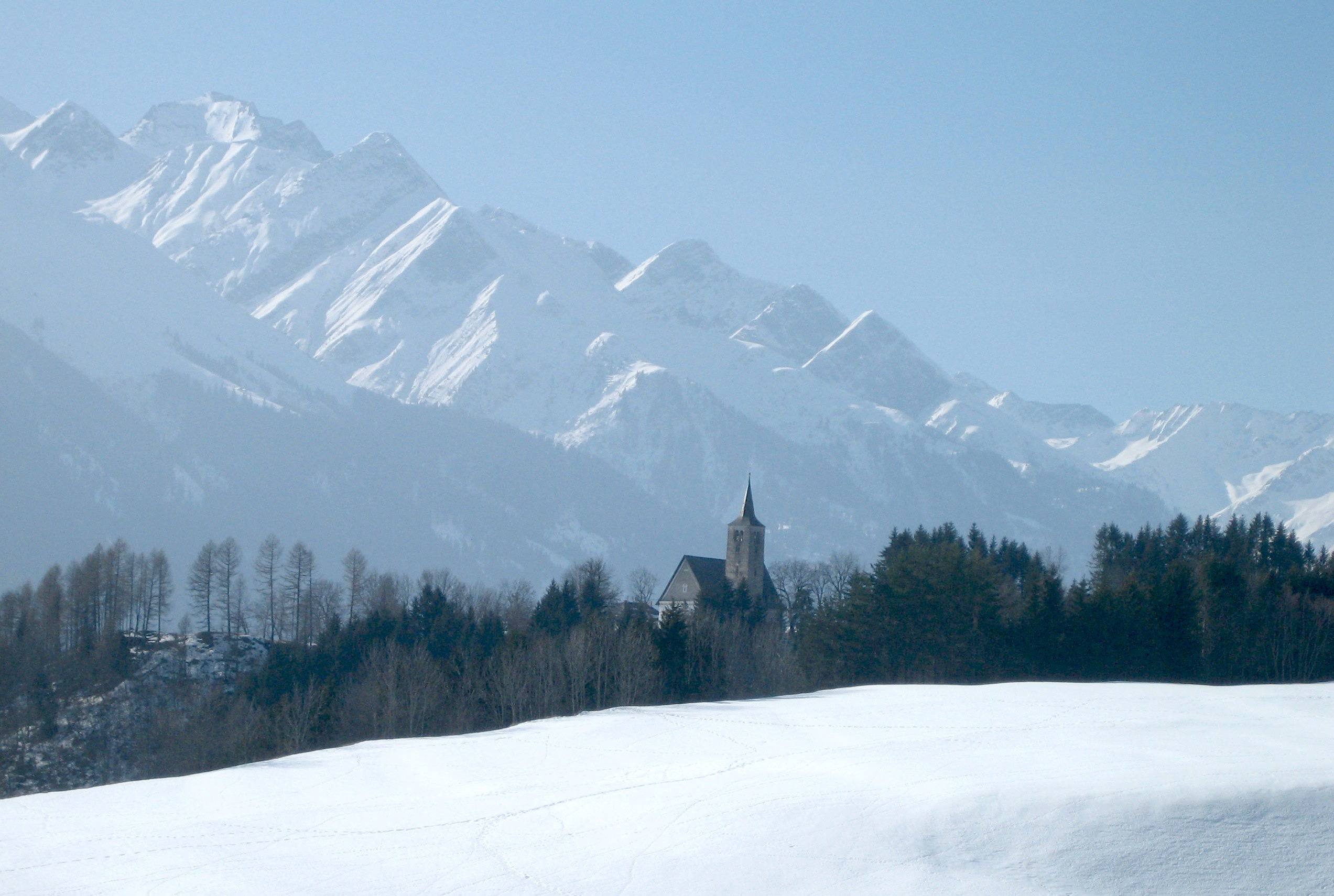
Church of St. Vincent

== Wakker Prize ==
Vrin was awarded the Wakker Prize for their integration of modern agricultural buildings into a traditional, historic village. The prize recognizes a project that the village has been involved in for a number of years.

Throughout the 20th century, the village population has steadily decreased. In the 1980s and 1990s, Vrin entered a partnership between the village, the Cantonal historic preservation department and ETH Zürich to strengthen the village's infrastructure and lead to population growth.

In the 1980s the residents of the village purchased all the free construction land to prevent land speculation and resultant price increases. The local architect, Gion A. Caminada, was hired to oversee construction.

Meadows were cleared, a butcher was brought in, a cooperative was founded and a slaughterhouse, barns and multi-purpose hall were all added. Most of the structures were built from wood in a log cabin style.

== Weather ==
Vella has an average of 116 days of rain or snow per year and on average receives 1,004 mm (39.5 in) of precipitation. The wettest month is August during which time Vella receives an average of 115 mm (4.5 in) of rain or snow. During this month there is precipitation for an average of 11.5 days. The month with the most days of precipitation is May, with an average of 11.7, but with only 100 mm (3.9 in) of rain or snow. The driest month of the year is February with an average of 55 mm (2.2 in) of precipitation over 11.5 days.

Vrin has an average of 121.1 days of rain or snow per year and on average receives 1,143 mm (45.0 in) of precipitation. The wettest month is August during which time Vrin receives an average of 139 mm (5.5 in) of rain or snow. During this month there is precipitation for an average of 12.7 days. The month with the most days of precipitation is July, with an average of 12.9, but with only 131 mm (5.2 in) of rain or snow. The driest month of the year is February with an average of 59 mm (2.3 in) of precipitation over 12.7 days.

== Notable residents ==
- Carmen Casanova, Women's Alpine Skier (born 1980 in Vignogn)

== Events ==
- Open Air Lumnezia – Popular Rock Concert in Degen
