= Parpaner Schwarzhorn =

Mountain in Switzerland

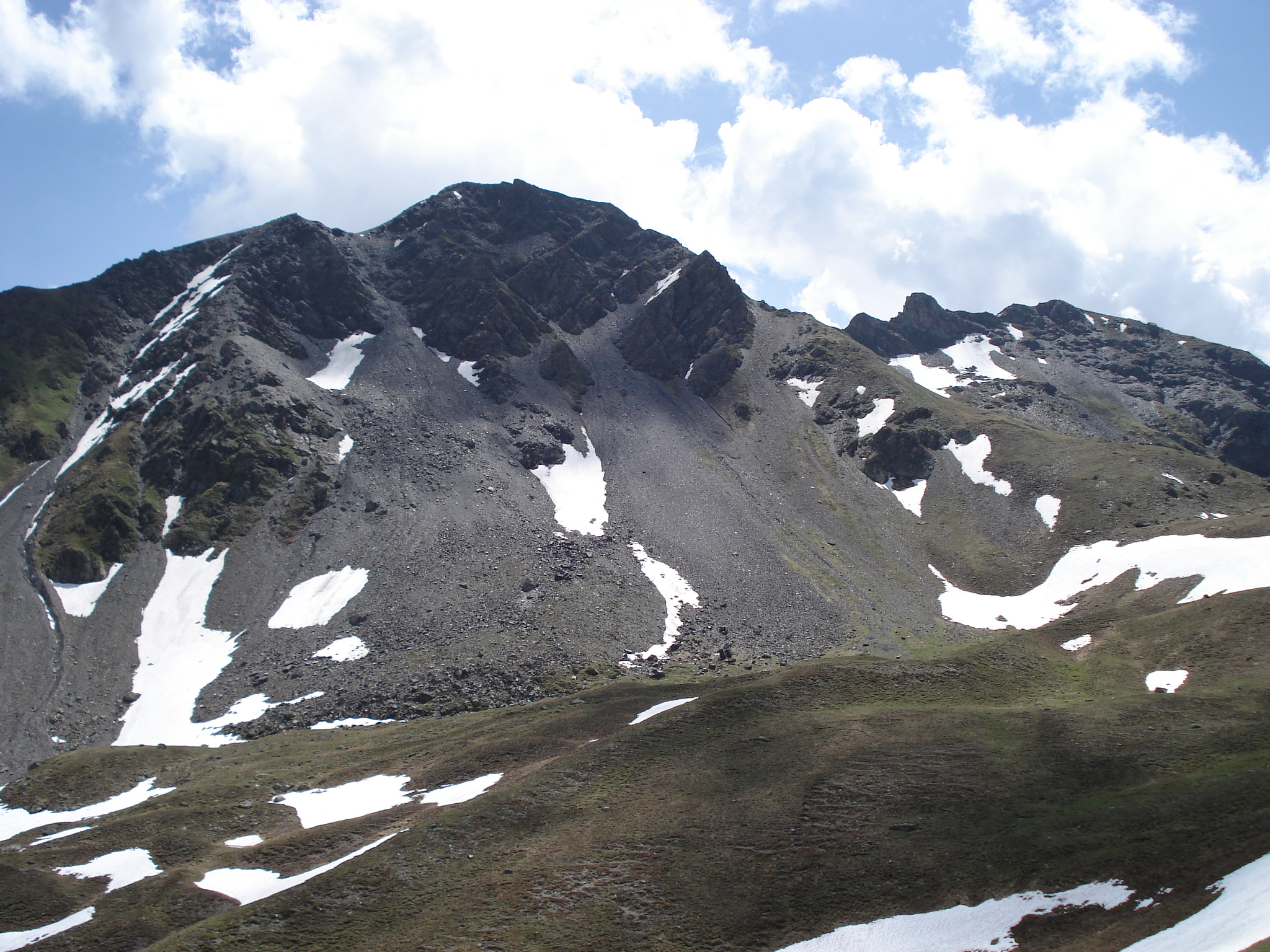
- West side

Highest point
- Elevation: 2,683 m (8,802 ft)
- Prominence: 137 m (449 ft)
- Parent peak: Aroser Rothorn
- Coordinates: 46°46′28.3″N 9°35′47.4″E

Geography
- Location within Switzerland
- Location: Graubünden, Switzerland
- Parent range: Plessur Alps

The Parpaner Schwarzhorn is a mountain of the Plessur Alps, overlooking Parpan in the canton of Graubünden. It lies north of the Parpaner Weisshorn.
