= Tilisuna-Schwarzhorn =

Mountain in Vorarlberg, Austria

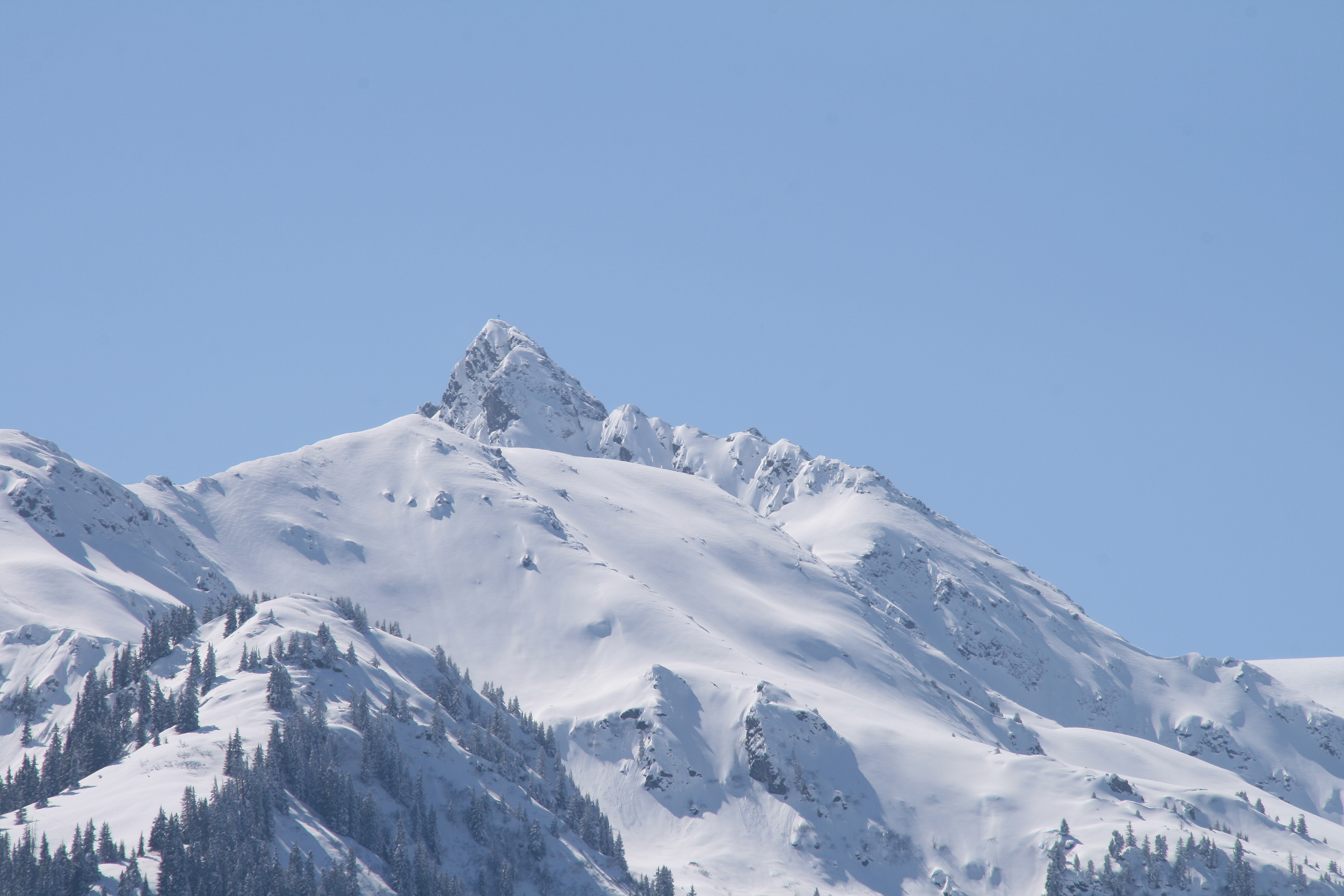

Highest point
- Elevation: 2,460 m (8,070 ft)
- Coordinates: 47°01′57″N 09°52′12″E

Geography
- Location within Alps
- Location: Vorarlberg, Austria
- Parent range: Rätikon (Sulzfluh sub-range)

Climbing
- First ascent: Land surveyors in 1853
- Easiest route: From south via Schwarze Scharte

Tilisuna-Schwarzhorn (also called Schwarzhara) is a mountain in the Sulzfluh sub-range of the Rätikon mountain range in the Austrian state Vorarlberg. It has elevation 2,460 m (AA), with a long ridge from north to south and wide scarps east and west. Besides the main summit, there is a second summit called Kleines Schwarzhorn. Both summits are separated by the col Fürkele. The alpine club hut Tilisunahütte (2208 m) is located near the Tilisuna-Schwarzhorn.

The first ascensionists of Tilisuna-Schwarzhorn were land surveyors in 1853. Nowadays there are two common routes to the summit:

- Easiest route: From south starting at Tilisunahütte via the saddle Schwarze Scharte in 45 to 75 minutes; some parts UIAA grade II, mostly grade I. This route was opened by J. S. Douglass and Chr. Zudrell in 1883.
- North ridge: From upper station of cable car Grabs via Alpe Alpila and Schwarzhornsattel (2166 m) in 2–2½ hours; UIAA grade II. This route was opened by A. Remann, G. Gaßner and B. Hemmerle in 1886.
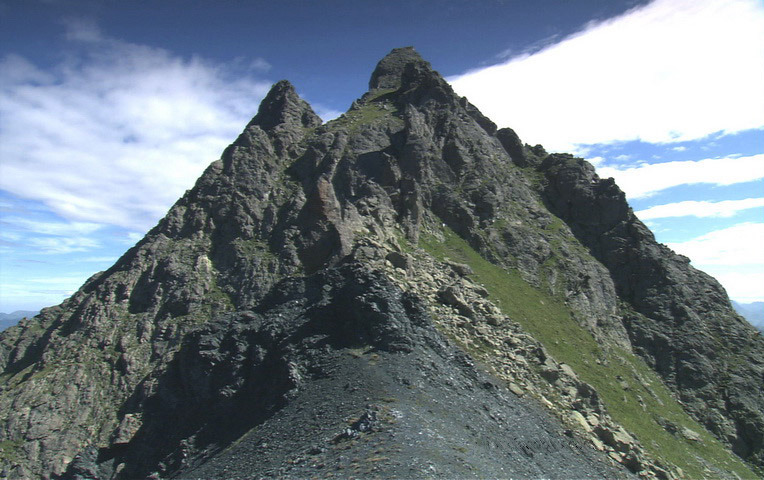
The two summits of the Tilisuna-Schwarzhorn

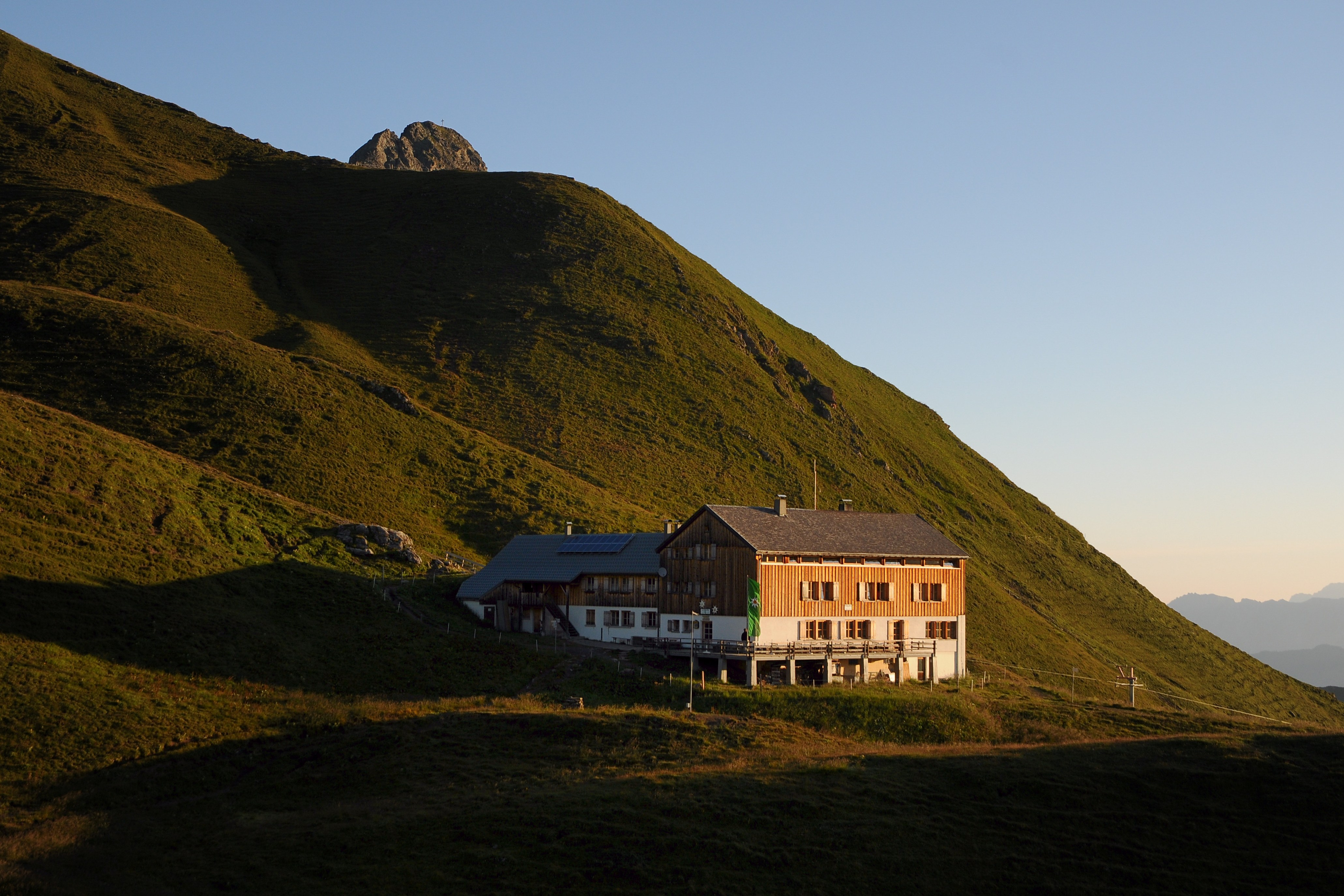
Alpine club hut Tilisunahütte in front of the Tilisuna-Schwarzhorn
