= Piz Mundaun =

Mountain in Switzerland

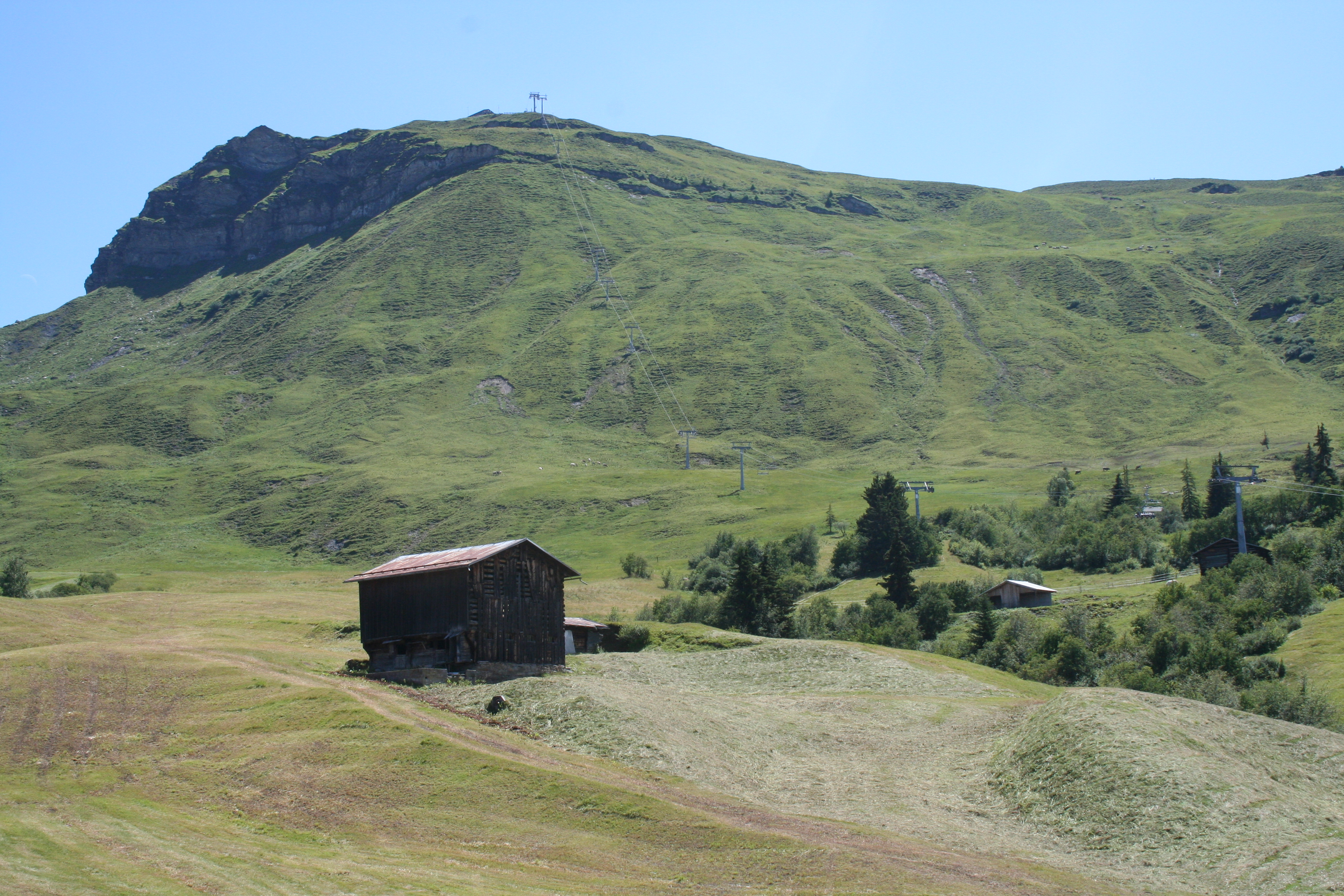
- View from the north side

Highest point
- Elevation: 2,064 m (6,772 ft)
- Prominence: 83 m (272 ft)
- Coordinates: 46°44′33.7″N 9°09′36.5″E

Geography
- Location within Switzerland
- Location: Graubünden, Switzerland
- Parent range: Lepontine Alps

Piz Mundaun is a mountain of the Lepontine Alps, situated east of Obersaxen in the canton of Graubünden in Switzerland.

In winter the mountain is part of ski area.
