= Mundaun =

- Former municipality
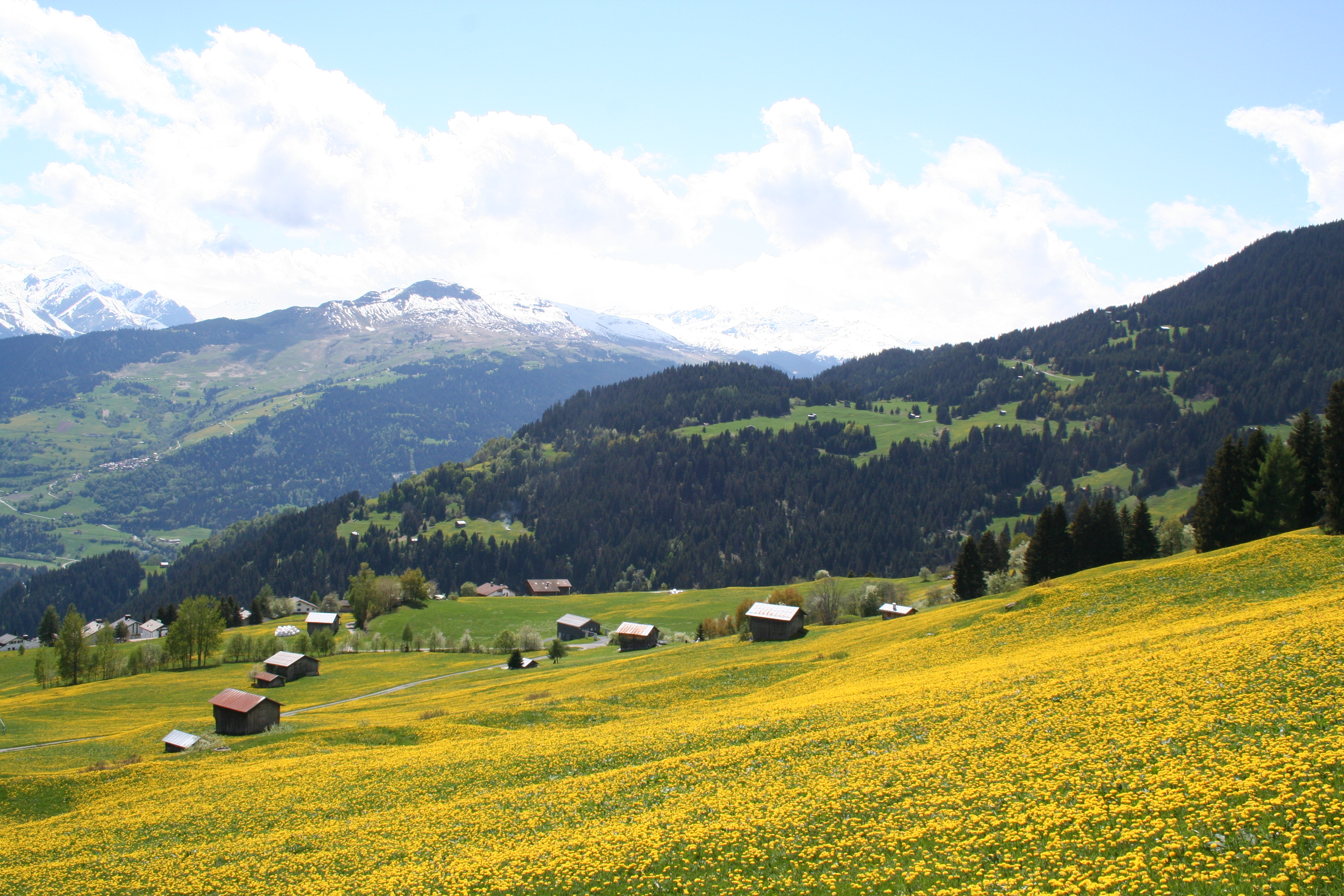

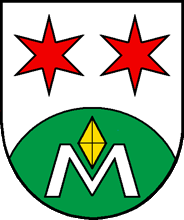
- Coat of arms
- Location of Mundaun
- Location within Switzerland Location within Canton of Graubünden
- Coordinates: 46°45′N 9°8′E
- Country: Switzerland
- Canton: Graubünden
- District: Surselva

Area
  - Total: 8.59 km^{2} (3.32 sq mi)
- Elevation: 1,346 m (4,416 ft)

Population (Dec 2014)
  - Total: 301
  - Density: 35.0/km^{2} (90.8/sq mi)
- Time zone: UTC+01:00 (CET)
  - Summer (DST): UTC+02:00 (CEST)
- Postal code: 7137
- SFOS number: 3617
- ISO 3166 code: CH-GR
- Website: www.obersaxenmundaun.swiss

Mundaun is a former municipality in the district of Surselva in the canton of Graubünden, Switzerland. It was formed on 1 January 2009 through the merger of Flond and Surcuolm. On 1 January 2016 the former municipalities of Obersaxen and Mundaun merged to form the new municipality of Obersaxen Mundaun.

== Geography ==
Aerial view (1970)

Mundaun had a combined area, as of 2006, of 8.6 km^{2} (3.3 sq mi). Of this area, 60.7% is used for agricultural purposes, while 29.0% is forested. Of the rest of the land, 4.7% is settled (buildings or roads) and the remainder (5.7%) is non-productive (rivers, glaciers or mountains).

The former municipality is located in the Lugnez sub-district of the Surselva district. It is located on the Obersaxen high plateau south of the Vorderrhein river.

== Demographics ==
Mundaun has a population (as of 2014) of 301, of which 6.2% of the population was made up of foreign nationals.

The age distribution, as of 2000, in Mundaun is; 43 children or 13.9% of the population are between 0 and 9 years old and 44 teenagers or 14.2% are between 10 and 19. Of the adult population, 29 people or 9.4% of the population are between 20 and 29 years old. 49 people or 15.9% are between 30 and 39, 45 people or 14.6% are between 40 and 49, and 34 people or 11.0% are between 50 and 59. The senior population distribution is 24 people or 7.8% of the population are between 60 and 69 years old, 28 people or 9.1% are between 70 and 79, there are 13 people or 4.2% who are between 80 and 89.

The historical population is given in the following table:

| year | population |
|---|---|
| 1850 | 363 |
| 1900 | 248 |
| 1940 | 291 |
| 1950 | 245 |
| 1990 | 237 |
| 2000 | 309 |
