= Surcuolm =

- Former municipality
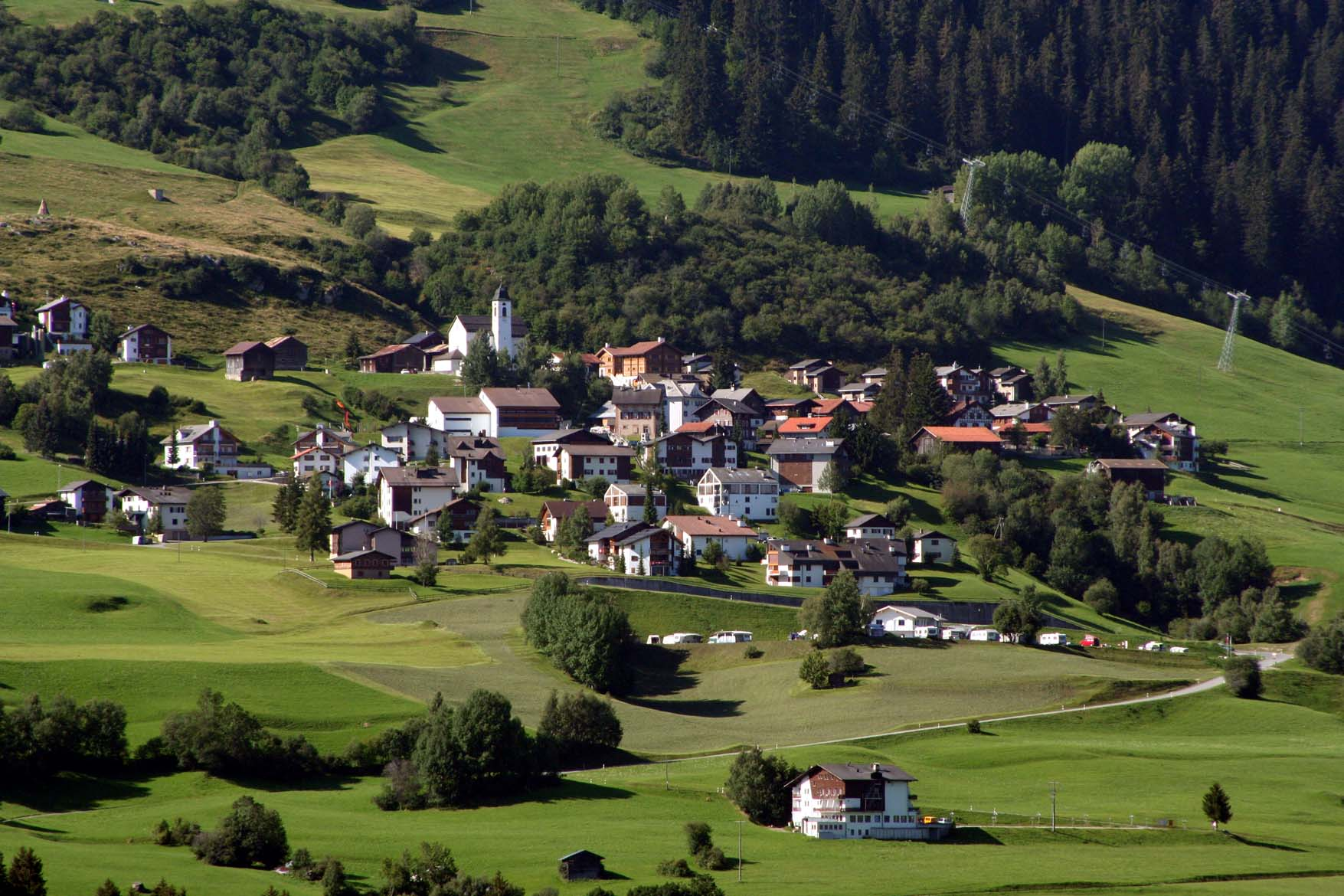

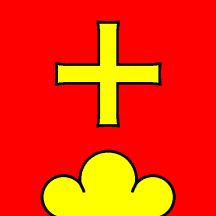
- Flag Coat of arms
- Location of Surcuolm
- Location within Switzerland Location within Canton of Graubünden
- Coordinates: 46°45′N 9°8′E
- Country: Switzerland
- Canton: Graubünden
- District: Surselva

Area
  - Total: 6.50 km^{2} (2.51 sq mi)
- Elevation: 1,346 m (4,416 ft)

Population (December 2008)
  - Total: 108
  - Density: 16.6/km^{2} (43.0/sq mi)
- Time zone: UTC+01:00 (CET)
  - Summer (DST): UTC+02:00 (CEST)
- Postal code: 7138
- SFOS number: 3600
- ISO 3166 code: CH-GR
- Surrounded by: Flond, Luven, Morissen, Obersaxen, Vella
- Website: www.obersaxenmundaun.swiss

Surcuolm is a village in the municipality of Mundaun in the district of Surselva in the canton of Graubünden in Switzerland. In 2009 Surcuolm merged with Flond to form the municipality of Mundaun.

== History ==
Surcuolm is first mentioned in the 18th century as Neukirch which was the official name until 1943.

== Geography ==
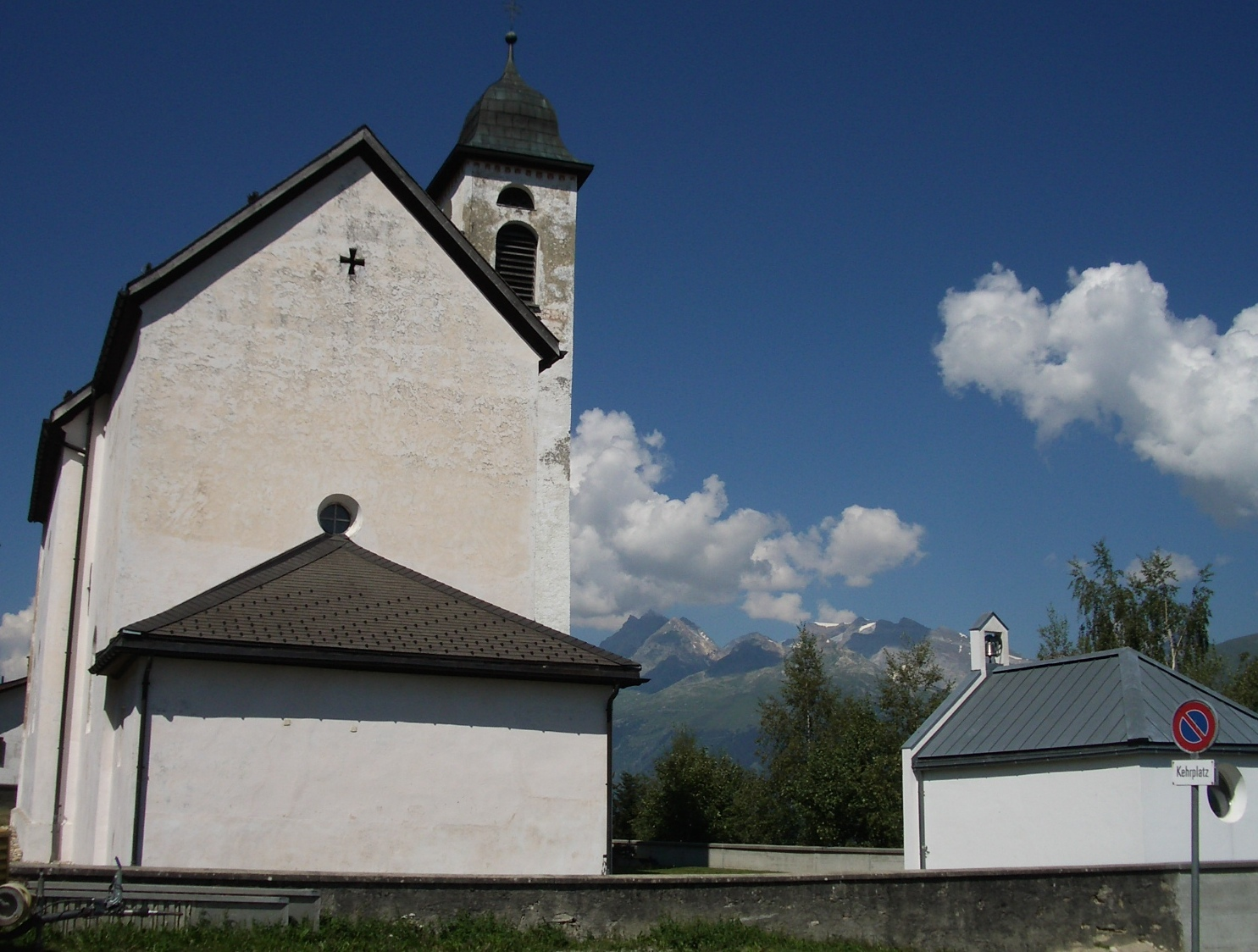
Village church of Surcolm

Surcuolm has an area, as of 2006, of 6.5 km^{2} (2.5 sq mi). Of this area, 67.1% is used for agricultural purposes, while 21.7% is forested. Of the rest of the land, 3.7% is settled (buildings or roads) and the remainder (7.5%) is non-productive (rivers, glaciers or mountains).

The village is located in the Lugnez sub-district of the Surselva district. It is located on the Obersaxen plateau and originally consisted of scattered farm houses and hamlets with a small central village. The village was mostly Romansh speaking and Roman Catholic, the later in contrast to the neighboring villages of Flond and Luven. Until 1943 Surcuolm was known as Neukirch bei Ilanz.

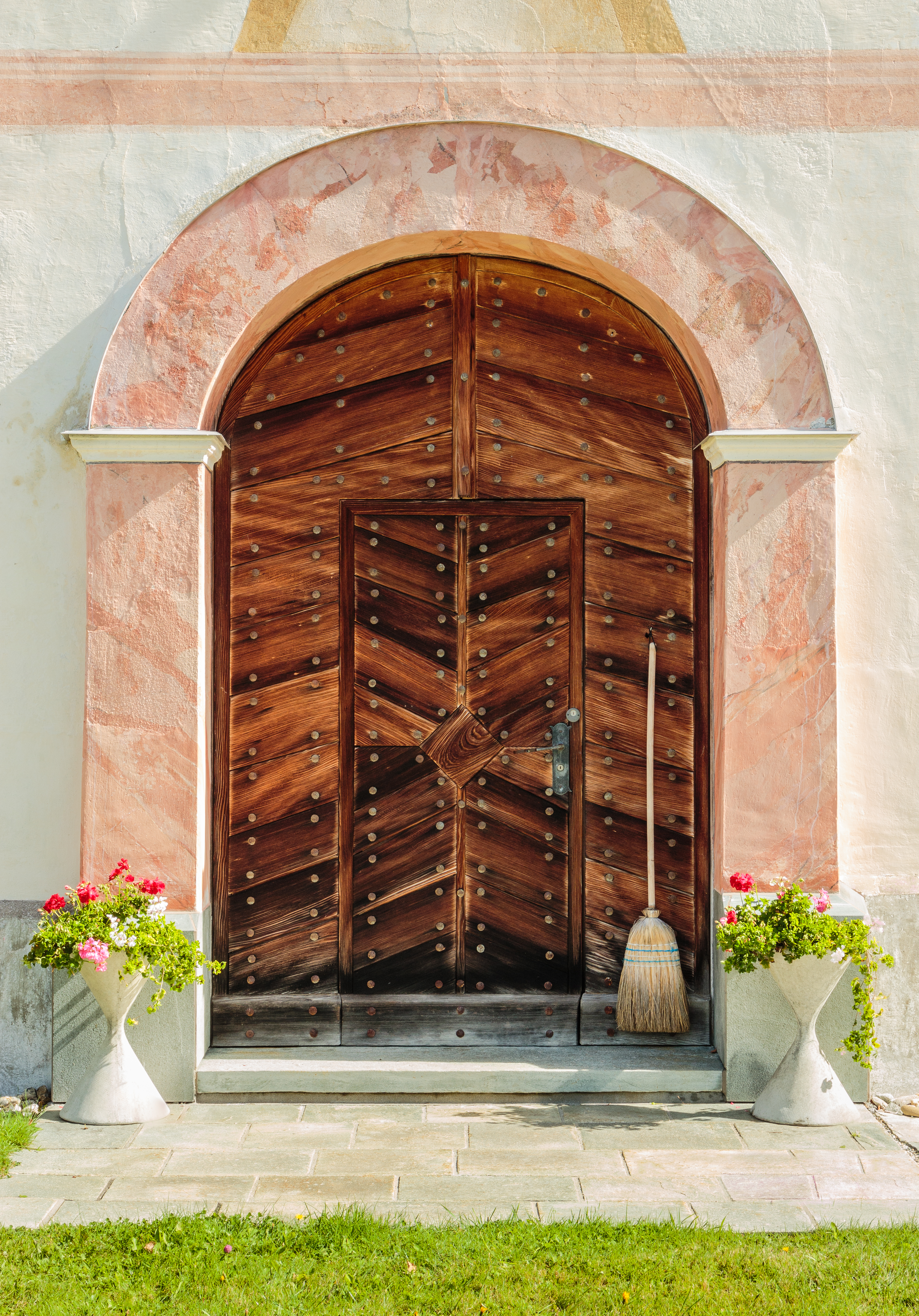
Catholic Church of St. Georg in Surcuolm Main entrance.

== Demographics ==
Surcuolm has a population (as of 2008) of 108, of which 3.7% are foreign nationals. Over the last 10 years the population has decreased at a rate of -26.4%. Most of the population (as of 2000) speaks German (55.4%), with Romansh being second most common (44.6%).

As of 2000, the gender distribution of the population was 50.5% male and 49.5% female. The age distribution, as of 2000, in Surcuolm is; 16 children or 12.3% of the population are between 0 and 9 years old and 19 teenagers or 14.6% are between 10 and 19. Of the adult population, 16 people or 12.3% of the population are between 20 and 29 years old. 15 people or 11.5% are between 30 and 39, 28 people or 21.5% are between 40 and 49, and 12 people or 9.2% are between 50 and 59. The senior population distribution is 7 people or 5.4% of the population are between 60 and 69 years old, 9 people or 6.9% are between 70 and 79, there are 8 people or 6.2% who are between 80 and 89.

In the 2007 federal election the most popular party was the CVP which received 63.4% of the vote. The next three most popular parties were the SVP (23.4%), the FDP (7.8%) and the SP (5.4%).

The entire Swiss population is generally well educated. In Surcuolm about 65.6% of the population (between age 25 and 64) have completed either non-mandatory upper secondary education or additional higher education (either University or a Fachhochschule).

Surcuolm has an unemployment rate of 0.49%. As of 2005, there were 14 people employed in the primary economic sector and about 6 businesses involved in this sector. 1 person is employed in the secondary sector and there is 1 business in this sector. 47 people are employed in the tertiary sector, with 13 businesses in this sector.

The historical population is given in the following table:

year	population
1850	167
1900	55
1940	112
1950	83
1990	93
2000	130
