= Steven L. Schwarcz =

American lawyer

- Born: New York, United States
- Spouse: Susan Beth Kolodny (m. 1976)

Academic background
- Education: B.S., 1971, New York University Tandon School of Engineering; J.D., 1974, Columbia Law School

Academic work
- Discipline: Bankruptcy law
- Institutions: Shearman & Sterling; Kaye Scholer; Yale University; Columbia Law School; Benjamin N. Cardozo School of Law; Duke University

Steven L. Schwarcz is an American lawyer. He is the Stanley A. Star Professor of Law and Business at Duke University.

== Early life and education ==
Schwarcz was born and raised in New York City to father Charles Schwarcz. After earning his Bachelor of Science from New York University Tandon School of Engineering, he received his Juris Doctor (J.D.) in 1974 from the Columbia Law School.

== Career ==
With his J.D. degree, Schwarcz worked as a partner at the law firms of Shearman & Sterling and Kaye Scholer and as a faculty member at Columbia Law School, Benjamin N. Cardozo School of Law, and Yale University. He eventually joined the law faculty at Duke University in 1996, and was shortly thereafter appointed the Stanley A. Star Professor of Law and Business. In 2010, Schwarcz was elected a Fellow of the American College of Bankruptcy and later a Senior Fellow of the Centre for International Governance Innovation.

In 2017, Schwarcz accepted multiple visiting fellowships in the United Kingdom and two of his texts on international trade were chosen by the United Nations Commission on International Trade Law to present at its 50th anniversary Congress.

== Personal life ==
Schwarcz married Susan Beth Kolodny in 1976. Two years later, Schwarcz, Gerard R. Wolfe, and Paul P. E. Bookson collaborated to restore the Eldridge Street Synagogue, which his grandfather has presided over in his prime.
