= Flond =

- Former municipality
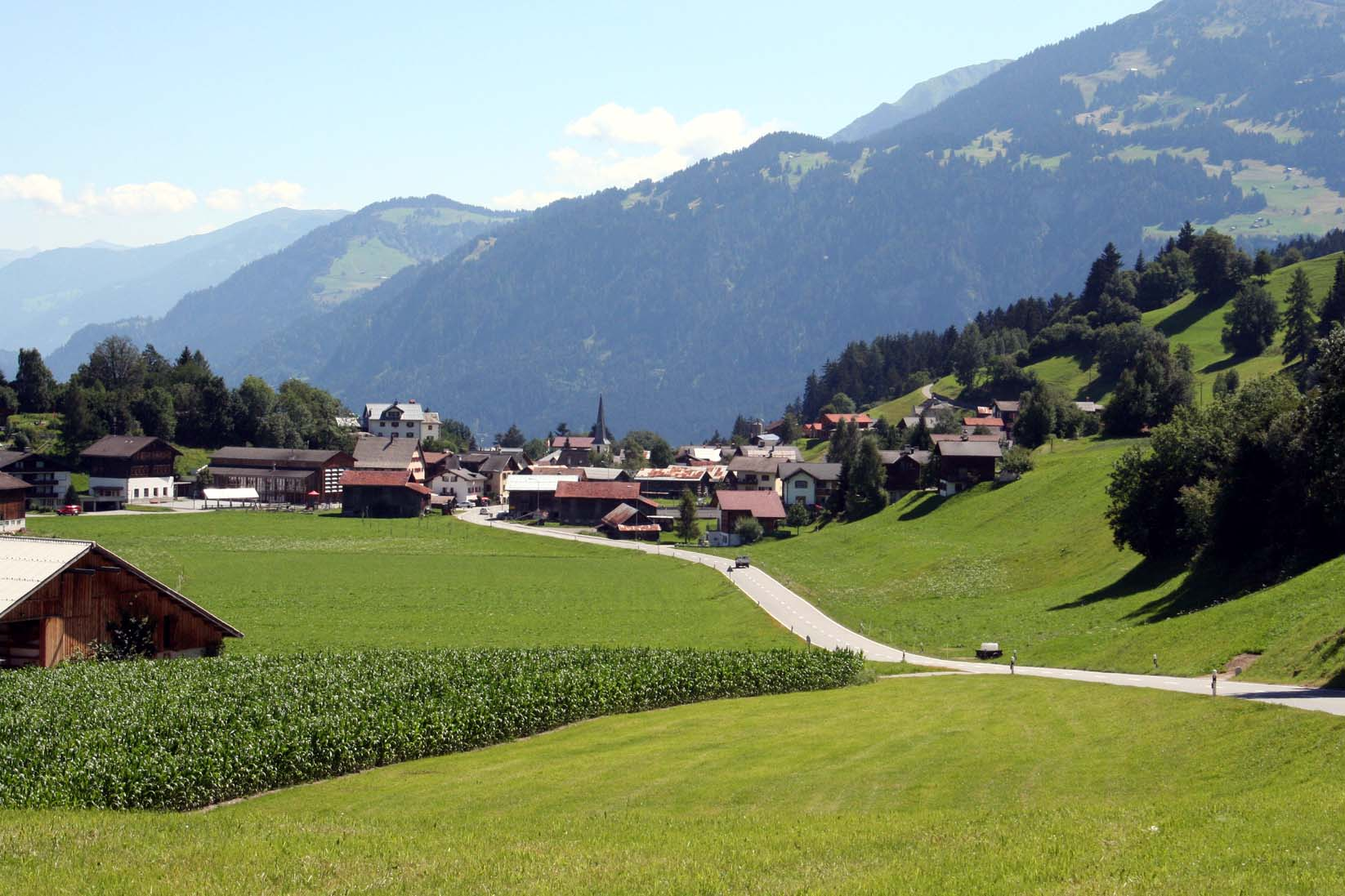

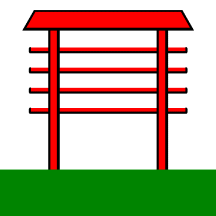
- Flag Coat of arms
- Location of Flond
- Location within Switzerland Location within Canton of Graubünden
- Coordinates: 46°46′N 9°9′E
- Country: Switzerland
- Canton: Graubünden
- District: Surselva

Government
  - Mayor: Peter Inauer

Area
  - Total: 2.12 km^{2} (0.82 sq mi)
- Elevation: 1,072 m (3,517 ft)

Population (December 2008)
  - Total: 201
  - Density: 94.8/km^{2} (246/sq mi)
- Time zone: UTC+01:00 (CET)
  - Summer (DST): UTC+02:00 (CEST)
- Postal code: 7137
- SFOS number: 3573
- ISO 3166 code: CH-GR
- Surrounded by: Ilanz, Luven, Obersaxen, Rueun, Surcuolm
- Website: www.obersaxenmundaun.swiss

Flond is a village in the municipality of Mundaun in the district of Surselva in the Swiss canton of Graubünden. In 2009 Flond merged with Surcuolm to form the municipality of Mundaun.

== History ==
Flond is first mentioned in 1519 as Flant or Flond.

== Geography ==
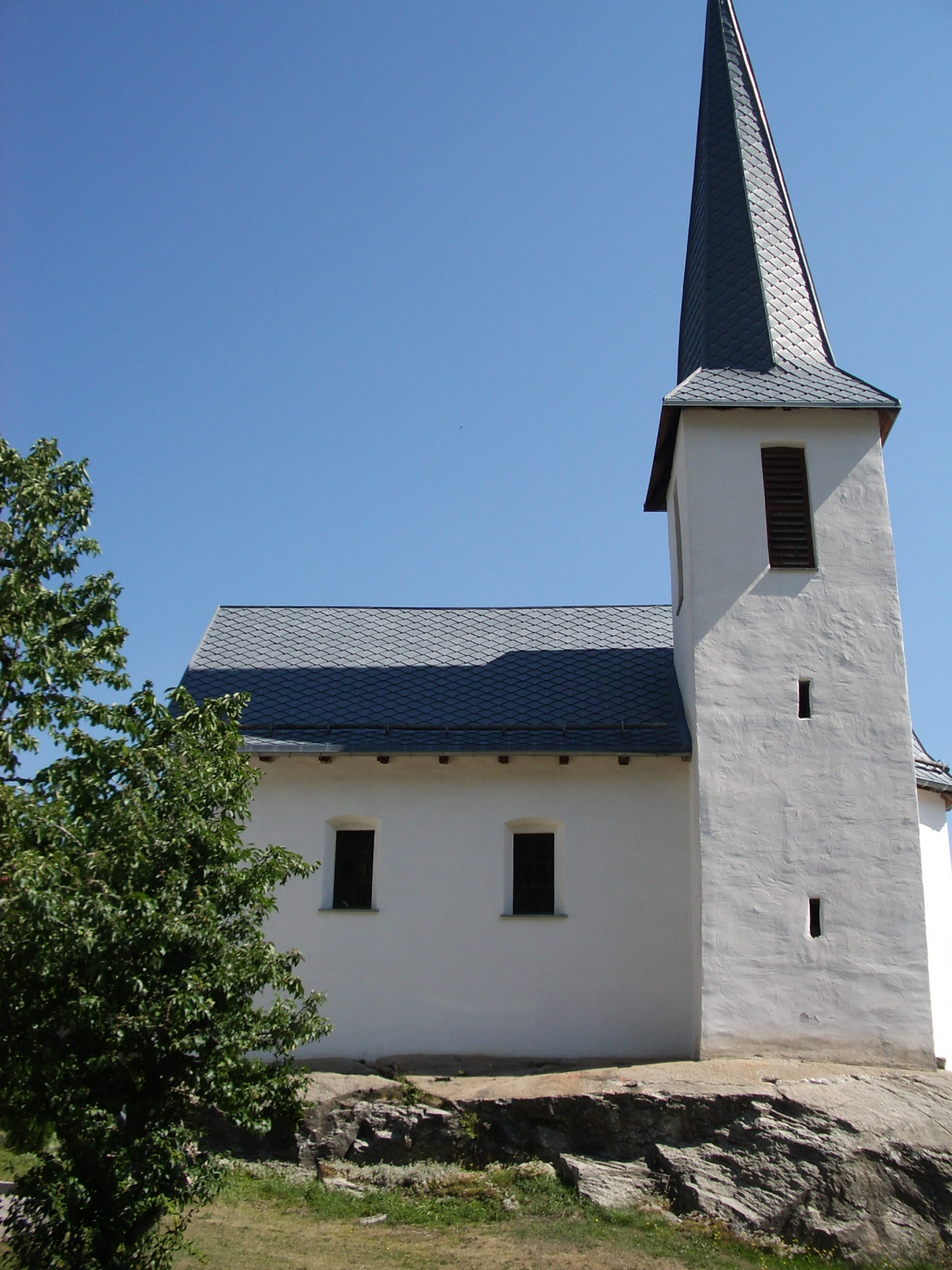
Church of Flond

Aerial view (1970)

Flond has an area, as of 2006, of 2.1 km^{2} (0.81 sq mi). Of this area, 40.7% is used for agricultural purposes, while 51.7% is forested. The rest of the land, (7.7%) is settled.

The village is located in the Ilanz sub-district of the Surselva district. It is on the Obersaxen high plateau south of the Vorderrhein river.

== Demographics ==
Flond has a population (as of 2008) of 201, of which 7.5% are foreign nationals. Over the last 10 years the population has grown at a rate of 20.3%.

As of 2000, the gender distribution of the population was 55.1% male and 44.9% female. The age distribution, as of 2000, in Flond is; 27 children or 15.1% of the population are between 0 and 9 years old and 25 teenagers or 14.0% are between 10 and 19. Of the adult population, 13 people or 7.3% of the population are between 20 and 29 years old. 34 people or 19.0% are between 30 and 39, 17 people or 9.5% are between 40 and 49, and 22 people or 12.3% are between 50 and 59. The senior population distribution is 17 people or 9.5% of the population are between 60 and 69 years old, 19 people or 10.6% are between 70 and 79, there are 5 people or 2.8% who are between 80 and 89.

In the 2007 federal election the most popular party was the SVP which received 43.3% of the vote. The next three most popular parties were the SP (22.7%), the CVP (21.2%) and the FDP (12.9%).

The entire Swiss population is generally well educated. In Flond about 76.2% of the population (between age 25–64) have completed either non-mandatory upper secondary education or additional higher education (either University or a Fachhochschule).

Flond has an unemployment rate of 0.53%. As of 2005, there were 14 people employed in the primary economic sector and about 7 businesses involved in this sector. 16 people are employed in the secondary sector and there are 2 businesses in this sector. 7 people are employed in the tertiary sector, with 5 businesses in this sector.

The historical population is given in the following table:

year	population
1850	196
1900	193
1940	179
1950	162
1990	144
2000	179

== Languages ==
Most of the population (as of 2000) speaks Romansh (50.8%), with German being second most common (46.9%) and Danish being third ( 1.7%). In the 19th century, the municipality was still monolingual (1880: 96.4%). This preponderance of Romansch remained strong through the first half of the 20th century (1941: 90.5%), but it has slipped in the second half of the century.

Languages in Flond
Language	1980 Census		1990 Census		2000 Census	
Language	Number	Percentage	Number	Percentage	Number	Percentage
German	21	18.92%	45	31.25%	84	46.93%
Romansh	88	79.28%	78	54.17%	91	50.84%
Italian	0	0.00%	0	0.00%	0	0.00%
Population	111	100%	144	100%	179	100%

In 1990, there were also 12 persons (8.33%) that listed Portuguese as their native language.
