= Schwartz =

Schwartz may refer to:

- Schwartz (surname), a surname (and list of people with the name)
- Schwartz (brand), a spice brand
- Schwartz's, a delicatessen in Montreal, Quebec, Canada
- Schwartz Publishing, an Australian publishing house
- "The Schwartz", a parody of the Force from Star Wars in the 1987 comedy science-fiction film Spaceballs

== See also ==
- Schwarz (disambiguation)
- Swartz (disambiguation)
- Schwarcz, a surname
