= Surcasti =

- Former municipality
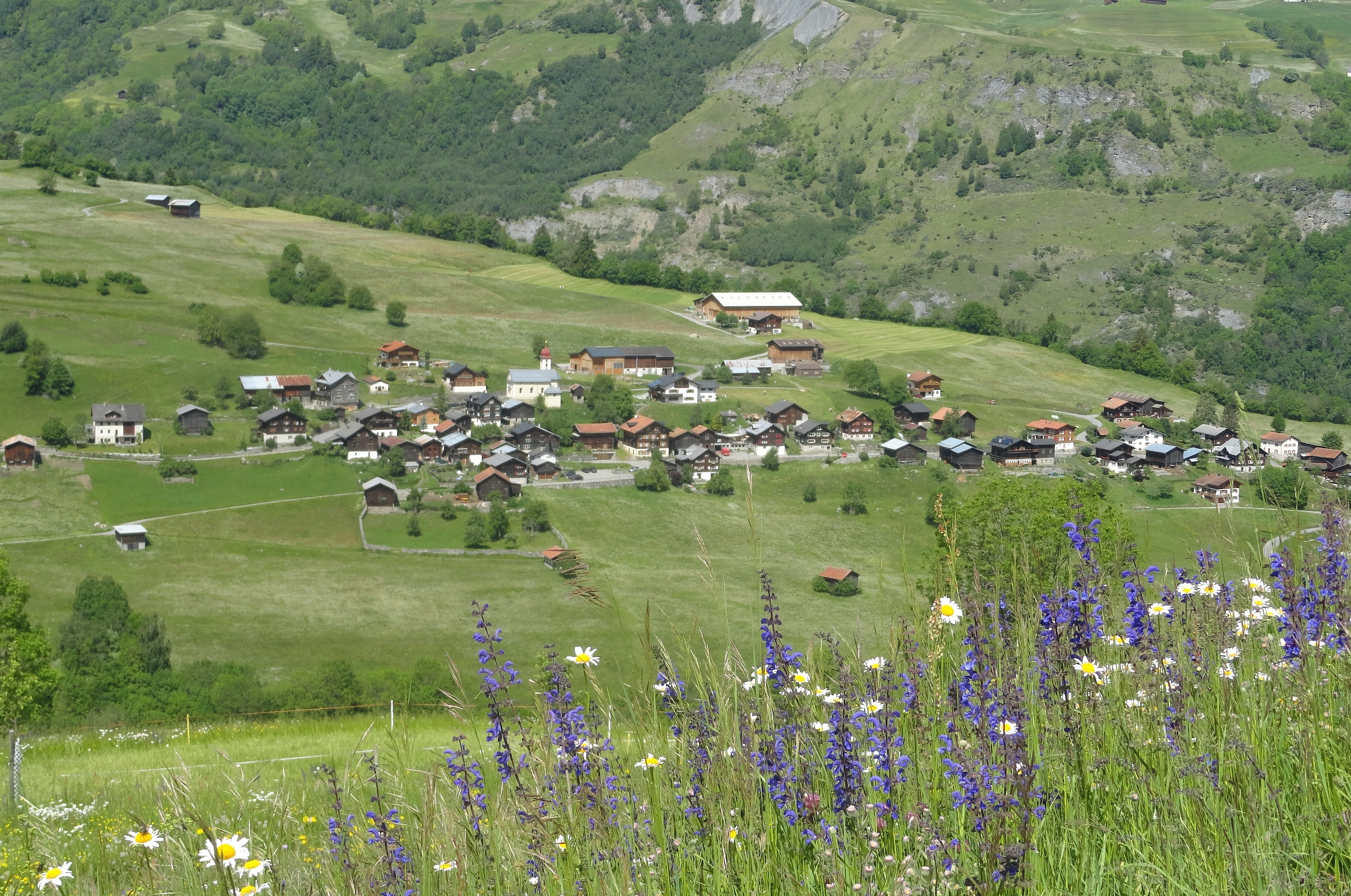

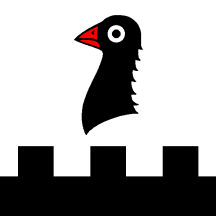
- Flag Coat of arms
- Location of Surcasti
- Location within Switzerland Location within Canton of Grisons
- Coordinates: 46.69629°N 9.176826°E
- Country: Switzerland
- Canton: Grisons
- District: Surselva

Government
  - Executive: Gemeindevorstand
  - Mayor: Gemeindepräsident

Area
  - Total: 5.88 km^{2} (2.27 sq mi)
- Elevation: 991 m (3,251 ft)

Population
  - Total: 79
  - Density: 13/km^{2} (35/sq mi)
- Time zone: UTC+01:00 (CET)
  - Summer (DST): UTC+02:00 (CEST)
- Postal code: 7115
- SFOS number: 3599
- ISO 3166 code: CH-GR
- Surrounded by: Degen, St. Martin, Tersnaus, Uors-Peiden, Vignogn
- Website: www.uniuns-suraua.ch

Surcasti is a village in Grisons, Switzerland It was a municipality in its own until 2003 with it merged with Camuns, Tersnaus and Uors-Peiden into Suraua which in turn merged with Cumbel, Degen, Lumbrein, Morissen, Vignogn, Vella, and Vrin into the new municipality of Lumnezia on 1 January 2013.
