= Camuns =

Village in Switzerland

- Former municipality
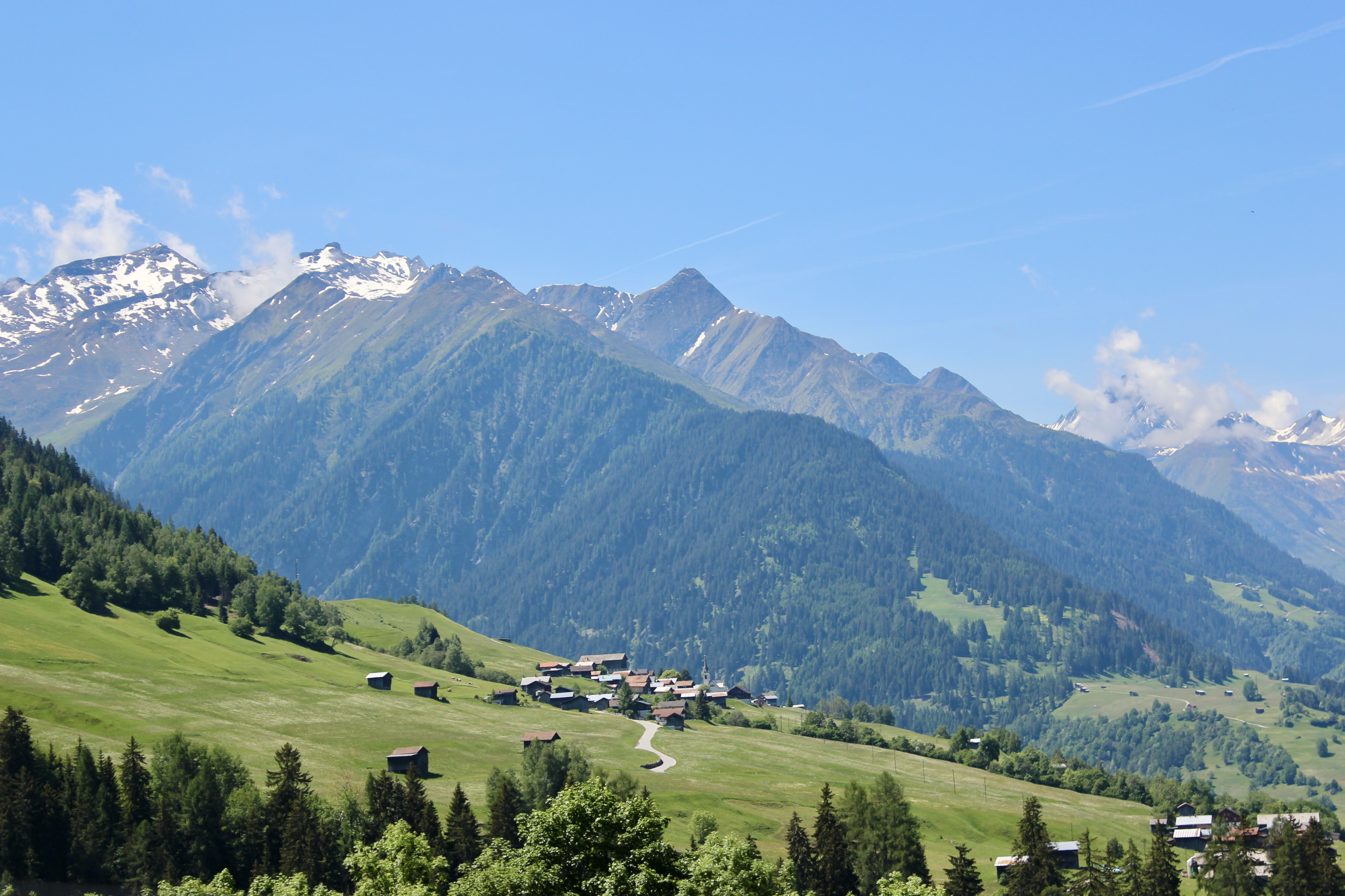

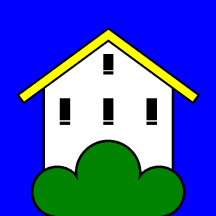
- Flag Coat of arms
- Location of Camuns
- Location within Switzerland Location within Canton of Graubünden
- Coordinates: 46°42′14″N 9°11′55″E
- Country: Switzerland
- Canton: Graubünden
- District: Surselva

Area
  - Total: 11.09 km^{2} (4.28 sq mi)
- Elevation: 1,177 m (3,862 ft)

Population (2000)
  - Total: 60
  - Density: 5.4/km^{2} (14/sq mi)
- Time zone: UTC+01:00 (CET)
  - Summer (DST): UTC+02:00 (CEST)
- Postal code: 7113
- SFOS number: 3591
- ISO 3166 code: CH-GR
- Surrounded by: Duvin, St. Martin, Tersnaus, Uors-Peiden
- Website: www.suraua.ch

Camuns ([kɐˈmʊns]) is a village in the municipality of Suraua, in the canton of Grisons, Switzerland. It used to be an independent municipality before merging on 1 January 2002 to become part of Suraua.
