= Suraua =

- Former municipality
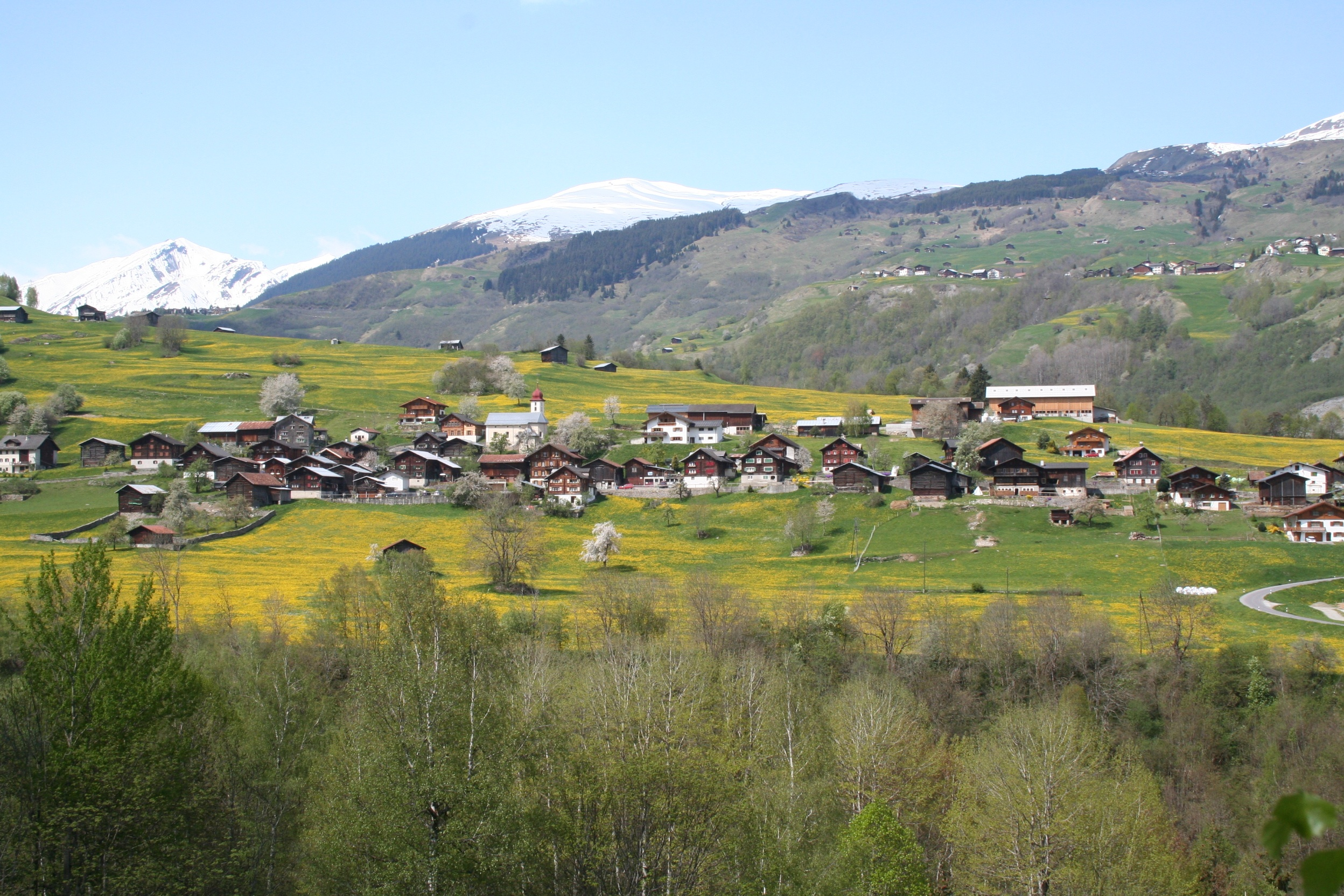
- Surcasti

- Flag Coat of arms
- Location of Suraua
- Location within Switzerland Location within Canton of Graubünden
- Coordinates: 46°42′N 9°11′E
- Country: Switzerland
- Canton: Graubünden
- District: Surselva

Government
  - Mayor: Casper Arpagaus

Area
  - Total: 24.20 km^{2} (9.34 sq mi)
- Elevation: 932 m (3,058 ft)

Population (Dec 2012)
  - Total: 238
  - Density: 9.83/km^{2} (25.5/sq mi)
- Time zone: UTC+01:00 (CET)
  - Summer (DST): UTC+02:00 (CEST)
- Postal codes: 7110 Peiden; 7114 Uors; 7113 Camuns; 7115 Surcasti; 7116 Tersnaus
- SFOS number: 3599
- ISO 3166 code: CH-GR
- Localities: Camuns, Surcasti, Tersnaus, Uors-Peiden
- Surrounded by: Cumbel, Degen, Duvin, Sankt Martin, Vella, Vignogn
- Website: www.suraua.ch

Suraua is a former municipality in the district of Surselva in the canton of Graubünden in Switzerland. The former municipality was formed on January 1, 2002, through the union of Camuns, Surcasti, Tersnaus, and Uors-Peiden. The municipalities of Cumbel, Degen, Lumbrein, Morissen, Suraua, Vignogn, Vella, and Vrin merged on 1 January 2013 into the new municipality of Lumnezia.

== History ==
The municipality was formed on 1 January 2002 through the merger of Camuns, Surcasti, Tersnaus, and Uors-Peiden.

- Camuns is first mentioned in 1543 as Gamundtz.
- Surcasti is first mentioned in 1515 as Oberkastels and until 1943 it was known by its German name of Obercastels.
- Tersnaus is first mentioned in 1362 as Terzenaus.
- Uors was first mentioned in 831 as villa Vorce, and in 1290 as Furze. Peiden was first mentioned in 1345 as Pedens.

== Coat of arms ==
The municipal coat of arms is Vert a Bend wavy Azure fimbriated Argent and overall an Annulet of the last and a Mullet of Four Or frettee.

The coat of arms was chosen through a contest where the children of the municipality were invited to submit their design for the new coat of arms following the merger. It symbolizes the geography of the municipality, with a river flowing through the green woods and fields. In the center is a ring that symbolizes the merger of the four former municipalities which are symbolized by the points of the star.

== Geography ==
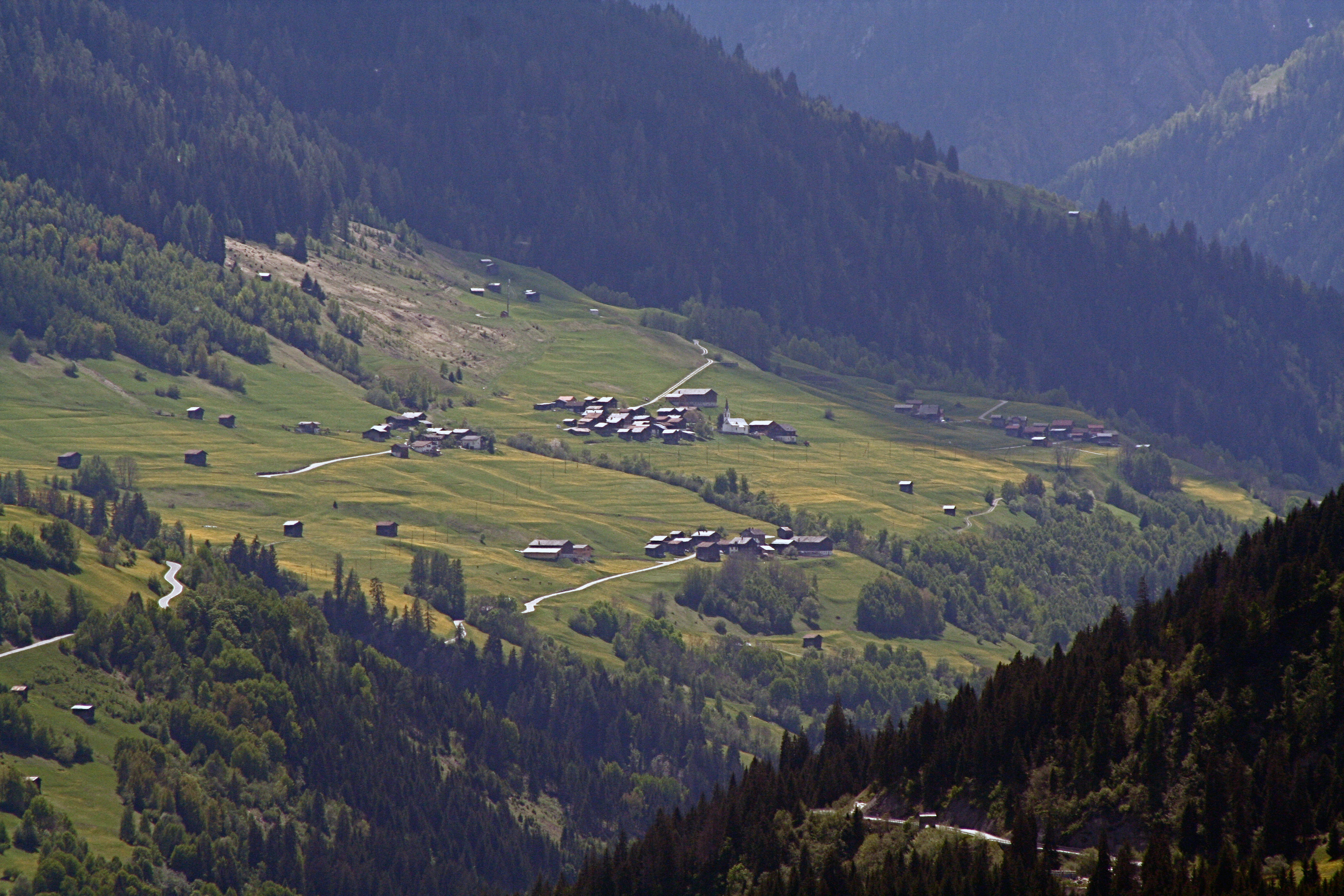
Camuns village

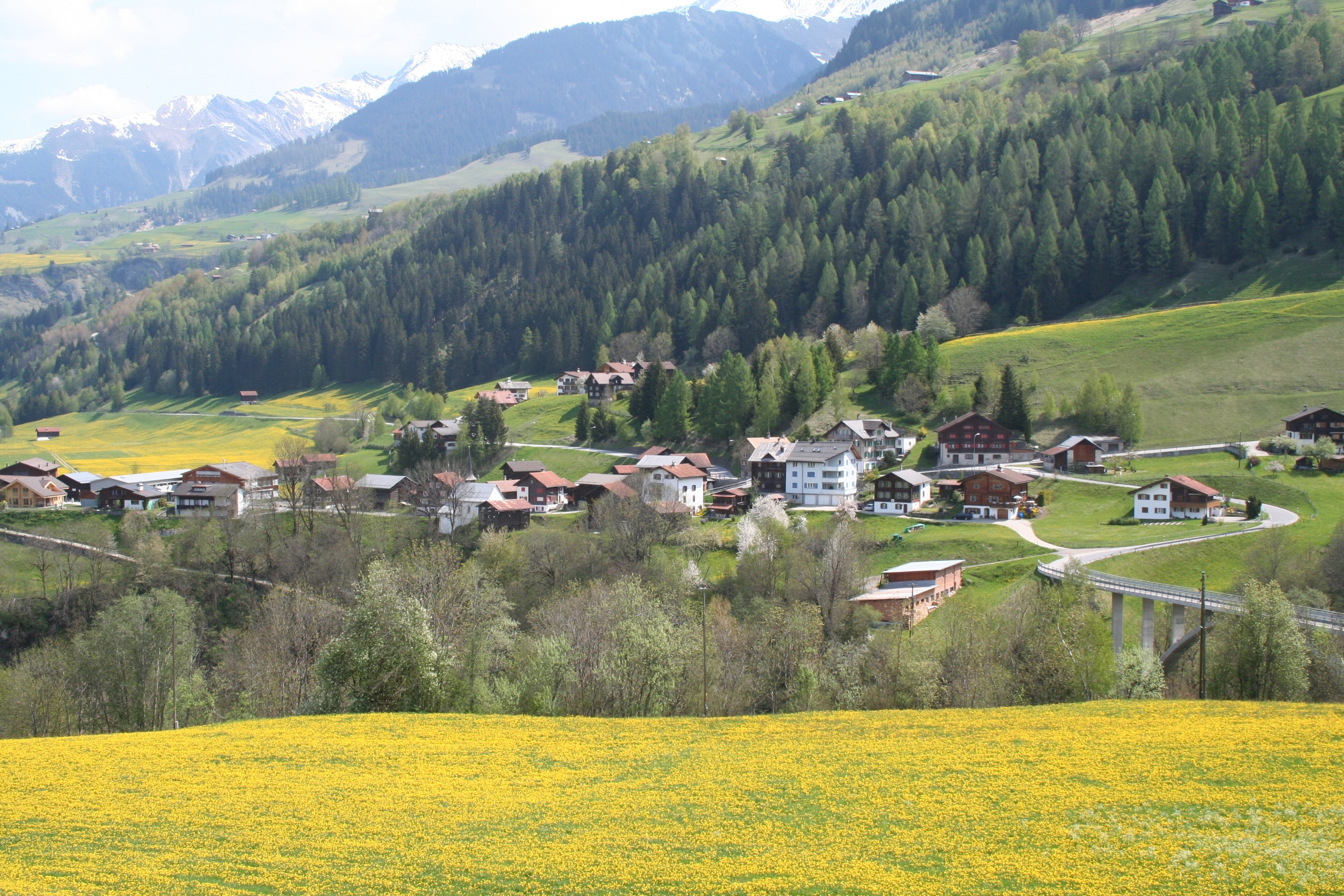
Uors village

Suraua had an area, as of 2006, of 24.2 km^{2} (9.3 sq mi). Of this area, 29.1% is used for agricultural purposes, while 52% is forested. Of the rest of the land, 2% is settled (buildings or roads) and the remainder (16.9%) is non-productive (rivers, glaciers or mountains).

The former municipality is located in the Lugnez sub-district of the Surselva district. It consists of the villages of Camuns, Surcasti, Tersnaus as well as Uors and Peiden, which in 1963 merged to form Uors-Peiden.

== Demographics ==
Suraua had a population (as of 2011) of 247. As of 2008, 2.2% of the population was made up of foreign nationals. Over the last 10 years the population has decreased at a rate of -15%. Most of the population (as of 2000) speaks Romansh (75.9%), with German being second most common (21.0%) and Serbo-Croatian being third ( 1.7%).

As of 2000, the gender distribution of the population was 51.5% male and 48.5% female. The age distribution, as of 2000, in Suraua is; 32 children or 12.8% of the population are between 0 and 9 years old and 29 teenagers or 11.6% are between 10 and 19. Of the adult population, 33 people or 13.2% of the population are between 20 and 29 years old. 43 people or 17.2% are between 30 and 39, 38 people or 15.2% are between 40 and 49, and 22 people or 8.8% are between 50 and 59. The senior population distribution is 29 people or 11.6% of the population are between 60 and 69 years old, 18 people or 7.2% are between 70 and 79, there are 6 people or 2.4% who are between 80 and 89.

In the 2007 federal election the most popular party was the CVP which received 57% of the vote. The next three most popular parties were the SP (19.9%), the SVP (18.2%) and the FDP (4.9%).

In Suraua about 54.5% of the population (between age 25 and 64) have completed either non-mandatory upper secondary education or additional higher education (either university or a Fachhochschule).

Suraua has an unemployment rate of 0.79%. As of 2005, there were 76 people employed in the primary economic sector and about 21 businesses involved in this sector. 11 people are employed in the secondary sector and there are 6 businesses in this sector. 11 people are employed in the tertiary sector, with 5 businesses in this sector.

The historical population is given in the following table:

year	Camuns	Surcasti	Tersnaus	Uors	Pieden
1850	77	167	232^{b}	156	91
1900	^{a}	167	60^{c}	104	129
1940/41	128	112	^{a}	^{a}	^{a}
1950	^{a}	149	175	^{a}	87
1990	45	73	^{a}	^{a}	20^{d}
2000	60	^{a}	70	90	^{a}

^a No data given in reference
^b Including St. Martin
^c Without St. Martin
^d Without Uors, since 1961 merged into Uors-Peiden

== Heritage sites of national significance ==
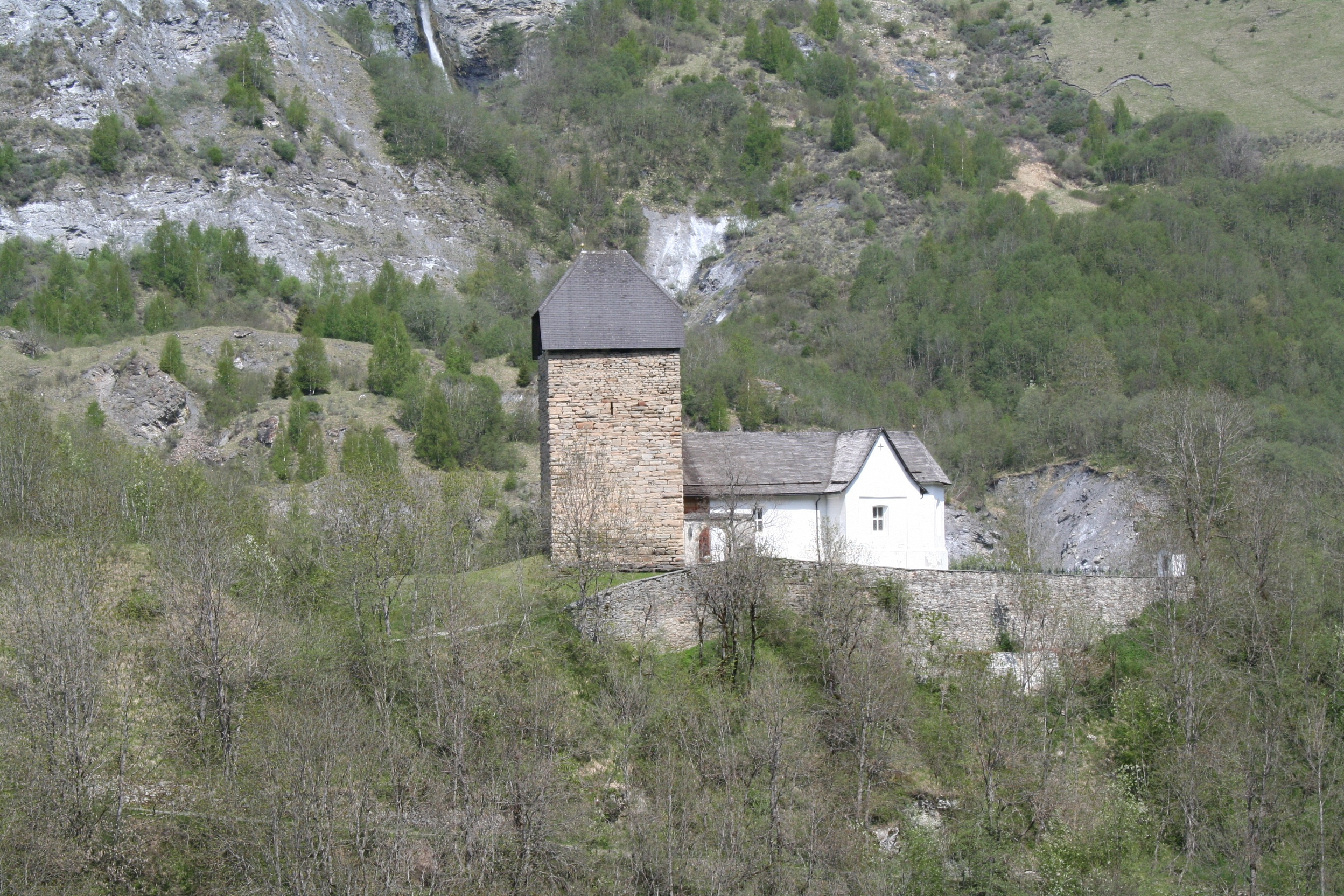
Formerly castle Surcasti, now Church of S. Luregn/St. Lorenz

The Church of S. Luregn/St. Lorenz is listed as a Swiss heritage site of national significance.

The tower dates to the 12th century, and is first mentioned in 1253 as the property of the Freiherr von Überkastel. At that time it was the castle of the Überkastel family. When the family died out in the 15th century the tower was used as a church tower for the Church of S. Luregn/St. Lorenz. Records of the church have been found from 1345, 1515 and 1520. The gothic church was consecrated in 1520. In 1774 it was rebuilt in a baroque style which remains today. During the restoration, a valuable madonna statue was discovered, which is now in the museum at Disentis Abbey.
