= Vrin =

- Former municipality
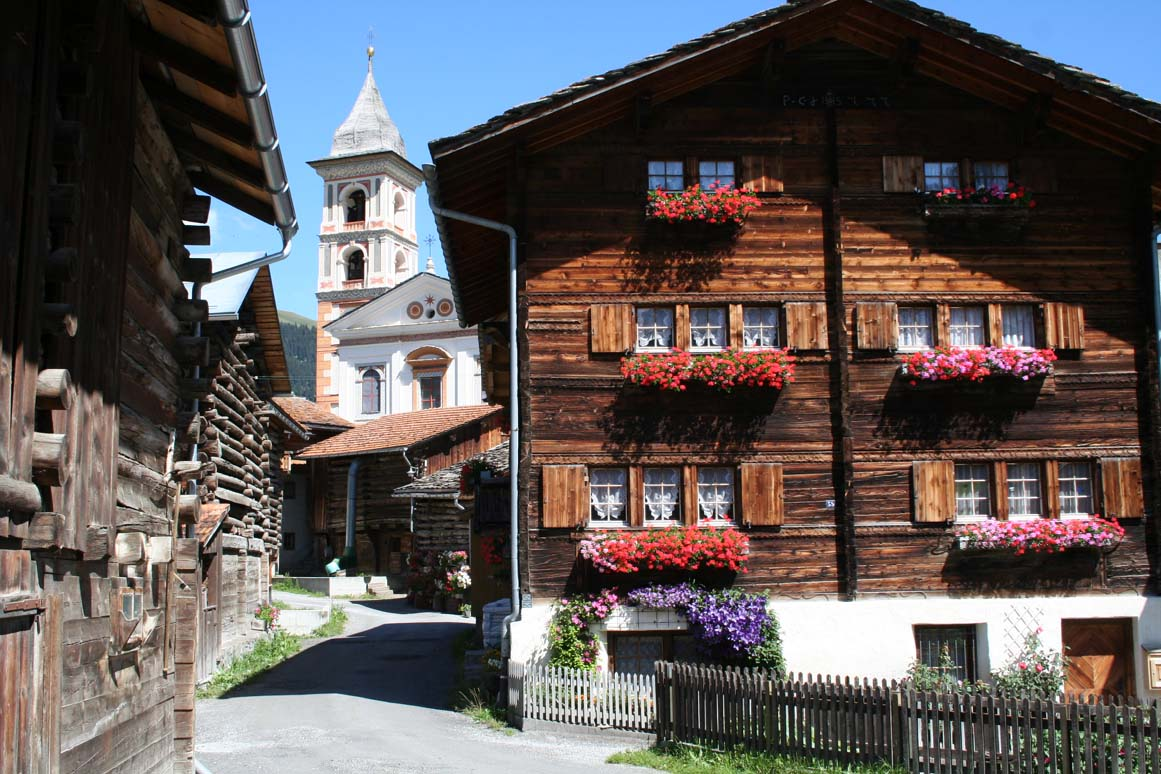

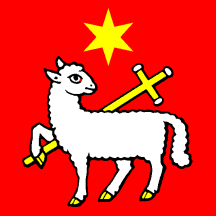
- Flag Coat of arms
- Location of Vrin
- Location within Switzerland Location within Canton of Graubünden
- Coordinates: 46°39′N 9°5′E
- Country: Switzerland
- Canton: Graubünden
- District: Surselva

Area
  - Total: 71.23 km^{2} (27.50 sq mi)
- Elevation: 1,448 m (4,751 ft)

Population (Dec 2011)
  - Total: 255
  - Density: 3.58/km^{2} (9.27/sq mi)
- Time zone: UTC+01:00 (CET)
  - Summer (DST): UTC+02:00 (CEST)
- Postal code: 7149
- SFOS number: 3606
- ISO 3166 code: CH-GR
- Surrounded by: Blenio (TI), Lumbrein, Medel (Lucmagn), Sumvitg, Vals
- Website: www.vrin.ch

Vrin (German pronunciation: [vʁin]) is a village and a former municipality in the Lumnezia. It belonged to the circle of Lugnez/Lumnezia in the district of Surselva in the canton of Graubünden in Switzerland. The municipalities of Cumbel, Degen, Lumbrein, Morissen, Suraua, Vignogn, Vella, and Vrin merged on 1 January 2013 into the new municipality of Lumnezia.

In 1998, the village was awarded the Wakker Prize for the preservation of its architectural heritage.

== History ==
Vrin is first mentioned in 1208 as Varin.

== Geography ==
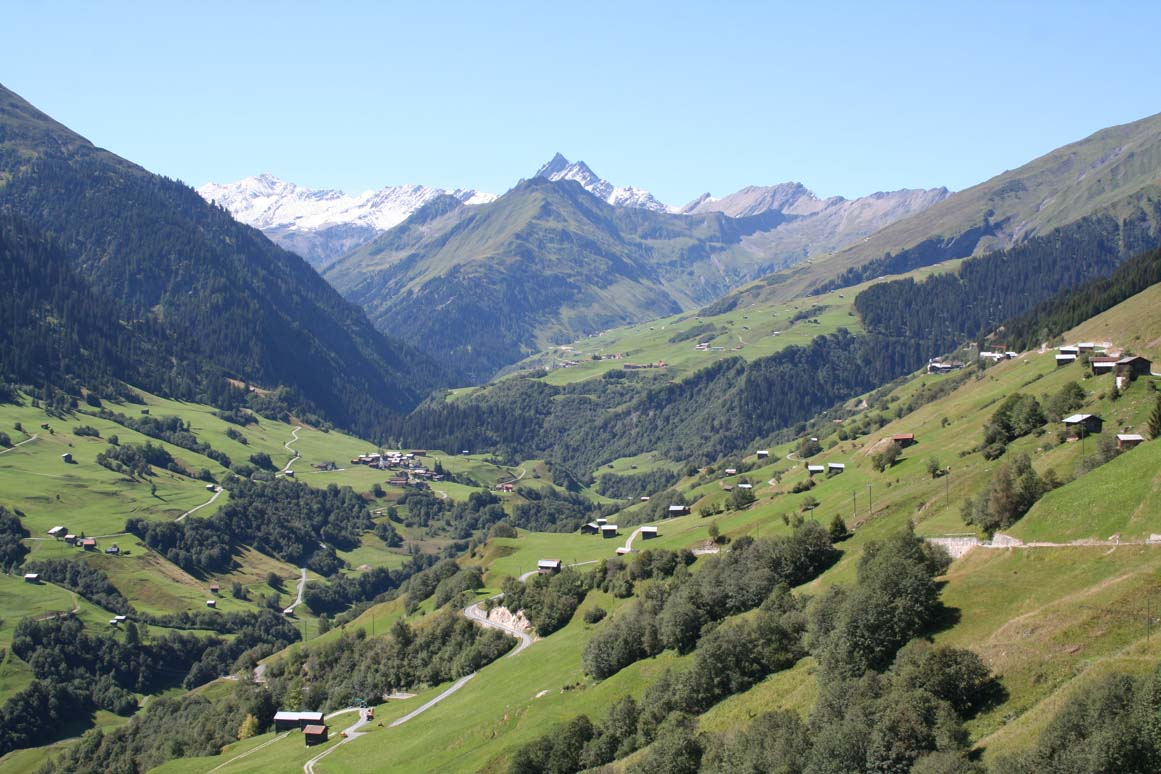
Lugnez valley near Vrin

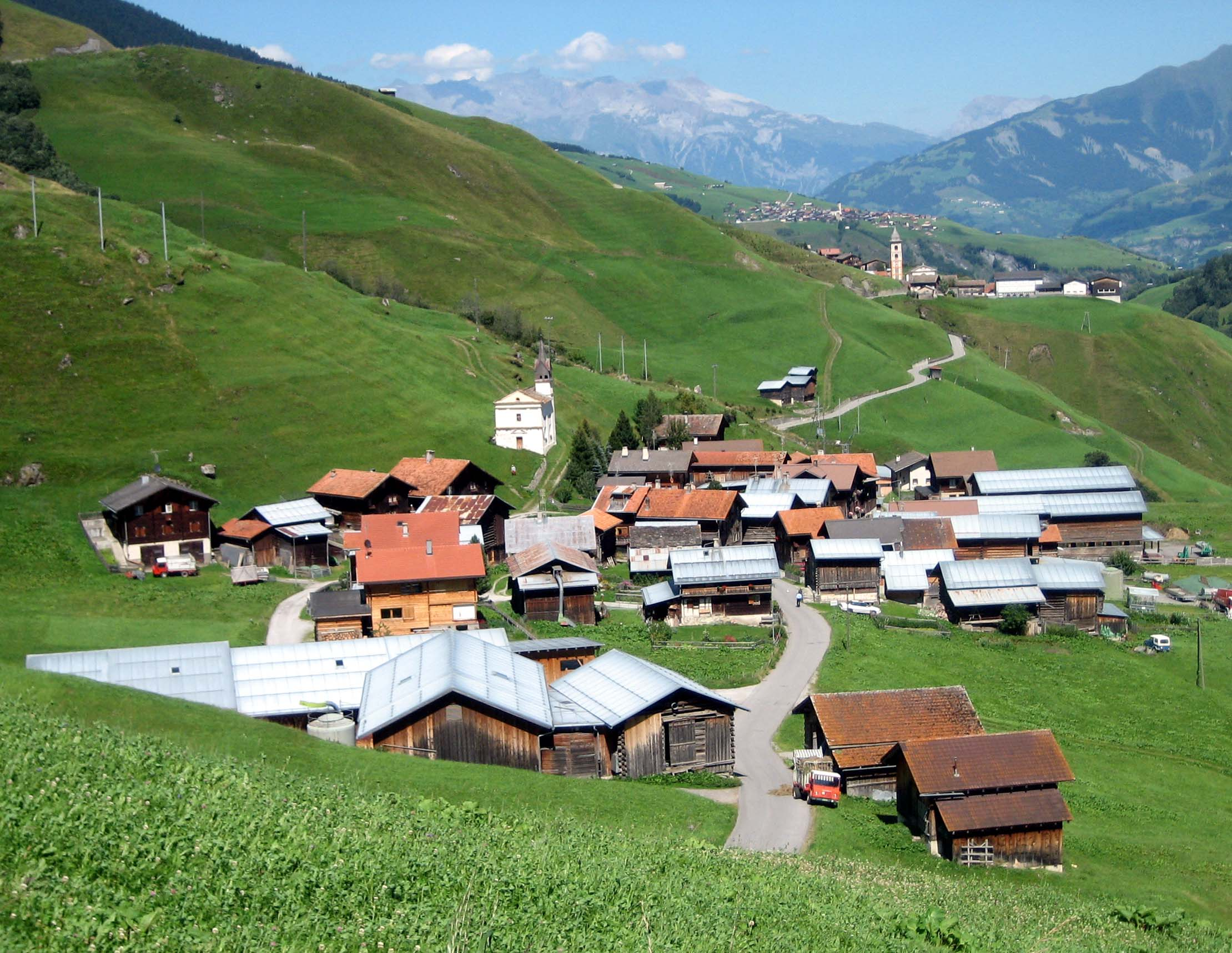
Settlement of Cons

As of 2006, Vrin had an area of 71.2 km^{2} (27.5 sq mi). Of this area, 39.3% is used for agricultural purposes, while 7.4% is forested. Of the rest of the land, 0.5% is settled (buildings or roads) and the remainder (52.9%) is non-productive (rivers, glaciers, or mountains).

The former municipality is located in the Lugnez sub-district of the Surselva district in the Upper Lugnez valley at the entrance to the Diesrut pass (source of the Glenner river) and near the Greina pass. It consists of the settlements of Vrin-dado (1,451 m (4,760 ft)), Vrin-dadens (main village), Cons, Ligiazun, and Sogn Giusep. Additionally, a number of abandoned settlements are part of the municipality, including; Pignola (1,685 m (5,528 ft)), Puzzatsch, Foppa, Camplun, Vilegn, Schareida, Blengias, and Vanescha.

== Demographics ==
As of 2011, Vrin had a population of 255. As of 2008, 1.2% of the population was made up of foreign nationals. Over the last 10 years, the population has decreased at a rate of -13.2%. Most of the population (as of 2000) speaks Romansh (95.6%), with German being second most common (4.0%) and Polish being third (0.4%).

As of 2000, the gender distribution of the population was 52.6% male and 47.4% female. The age distribution, as of 2000, in Vrin is; 38 children or 15.3% of the population are between 0 and 9 years old and 25 teenagers or 10.0% are between 10 and 19. Of the adult population, 21 people or 8.4% of the population are between 20 and 29 years old. 37 people or 14.9% are between 30 and 39, 26 people or 10.4% are between 40 and 49, and 24 people or 9.6% are between 50 and 59. The senior population distribution is 38 people or 15.3% of the population are between 60 and 69 years old, 28 people or 11.2% are between 70 and 79, there are 10 people or 4.0% who are between 80 and 89, and there are 2 people or 0.8% who are between 90 and 99.

In the 2007 federal election, the most popular party was the CVP which received 45.1% of the vote. The next three most popular parties were the SVP (29.7%), the FDP (18.2%) and the SP (7%).

In general, the Swiss population is well educated. In Vrin, about 39.5% of the population (between age 25–64) have completed either non-mandatory upper secondary education or additional higher education (either university or a Fachhochschule).

Vrin has an unemployment rate of 0.61%. As of 2005, there were 67 people employed in the primary economic sector and about 27 businesses involved in this sector. 19 people are employed in the secondary sector and there are 5 businesses in this sector. 30 people are employed in the tertiary sector, with 9 businesses in this sector.

The historical population is given in the following table:

year	population
1850	466
1900	366
1950	441
1960	393
1970	333
1980	266
1990	251
2000	249

== Wakker Prize ==
Vrin was awarded the Wakker Prize for their integration of modern agricultural buildings into a traditional, historic village. The prize recognizes a project that the village has been involved in for a number of years.

Throughout the 20th Century, the village population has steadily decreased. In the 1980s and 90's, Vrin entered a partnership between the village, the Cantonal historic preservation department and ETH Zürich to strengthen the village's infrastructure and lead to population growth.

In the 1980s the residents of the village purchased all the free construction land to prevent land speculation and resultant price increases. Local architect Gion A. Caminada was hired to oversee construction.

Meadows were cleared, a butcher was brought in, a cooperative was founded and a slaughterhouse, barns and multi-purpose hall were all added. Most of the structures were built from wood in a log cabin style.

== Heritage sites of national significance ==
The Church of S. Maria is listed as a Swiss heritage site of national significance.

The Church of the Immaculate Conception (St. Maria) and John the Baptist was consecrated in 1345. Until 1597 it was a chapel under the authority of the parish church of St. Vincenz in Pleif (part of the municipality of Vella).

== Weather ==
Vrin has an average of 121.1 days of rain or snow per year and on average receives 1,143 mm (45.0 in) of precipitation. The wettest month is August during which time Vrin receives an average of 139 mm (5.5 in) of rain or snow. During this month there is precipitation for an average of 12.7 days. The month with the most days of precipitation is July, with an average of 12.9, but with only 131 mm (5.2 in) of rain or snow. The driest month of the year is February with an average of 59 mm (2.3 in) of precipitation over 12.7 days.
