= Lumbrein =

- Former municipality
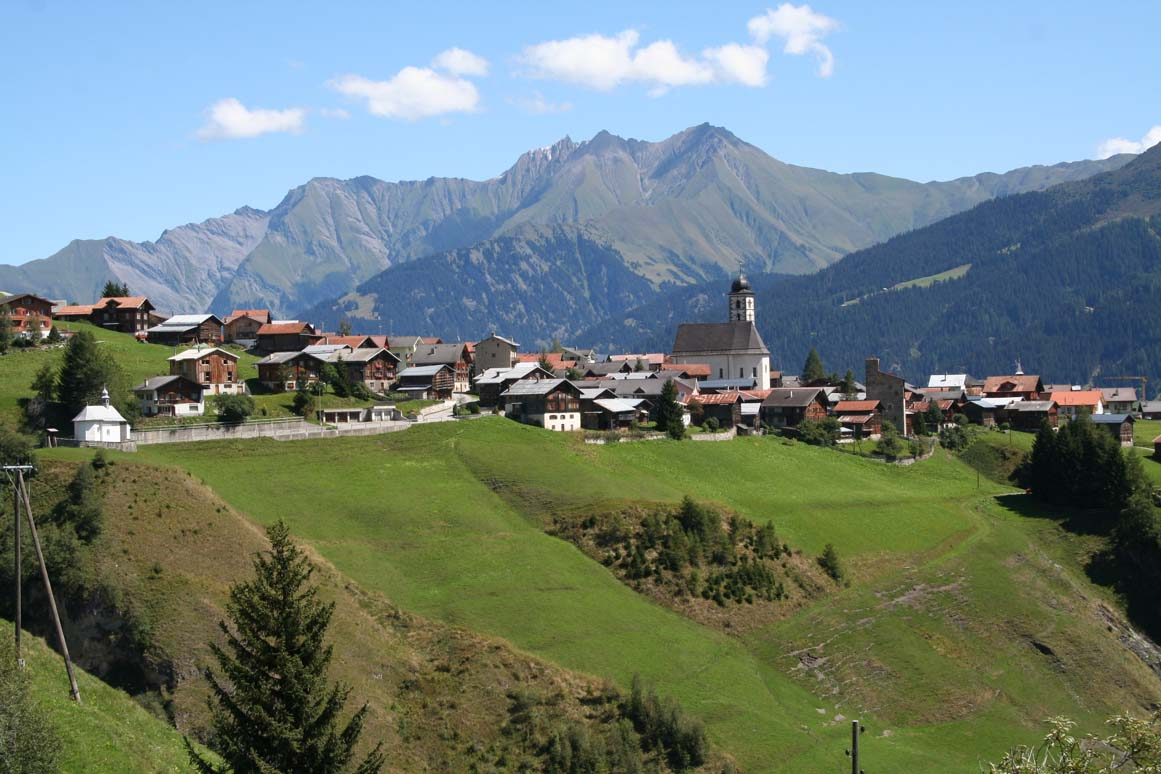

- Coat of arms
- Location of Lumbrein
- Location within Switzerland Location within Canton of Graubünden
- Coordinates: 46°41′N 9°8′E
- Country: Switzerland
- Canton: Graubünden
- District: Surselva

Area
  - Total: 37.86 km^{2} (14.62 sq mi)
- Elevation: 1,405 m (4,610 ft)

Population (Dec 2011)
  - Total: 363
  - Density: 9.59/km^{2} (24.8/sq mi)
- Time zone: UTC+01:00 (CET)
  - Summer (DST): UTC+02:00 (CEST)
- Postal code: 7148
- SFOS number: 3595
- ISO 3166 code: CH-GR
- Surrounded by: Obersaxen, Sankt Martin, Sumvitg, Vals, Vignogn, Vrin
- Website: www.lumbrein.ch

Lumbrein is a former municipality in the district of Surselva in the Swiss canton of Graubünden. The municipalities of Cumbel, Degen, Lumbrein, Morissen, Suraua, Vignogn, Vella, and Vrin merged on 1 January 2013 into the new municipality of Lumnezia.

== History ==
The Crestaulta hill near the hamlet of Surin was occupied since at least the early Bronze Age (ca. 2000-1700/1600 BC). However, Lumbrein is first mentioned about 850 as in villa Lamarine though this comes from a 16th-century copy of an earlier and now lost document. In 1231 it was mentioned as de Lumarins.

== Geography ==
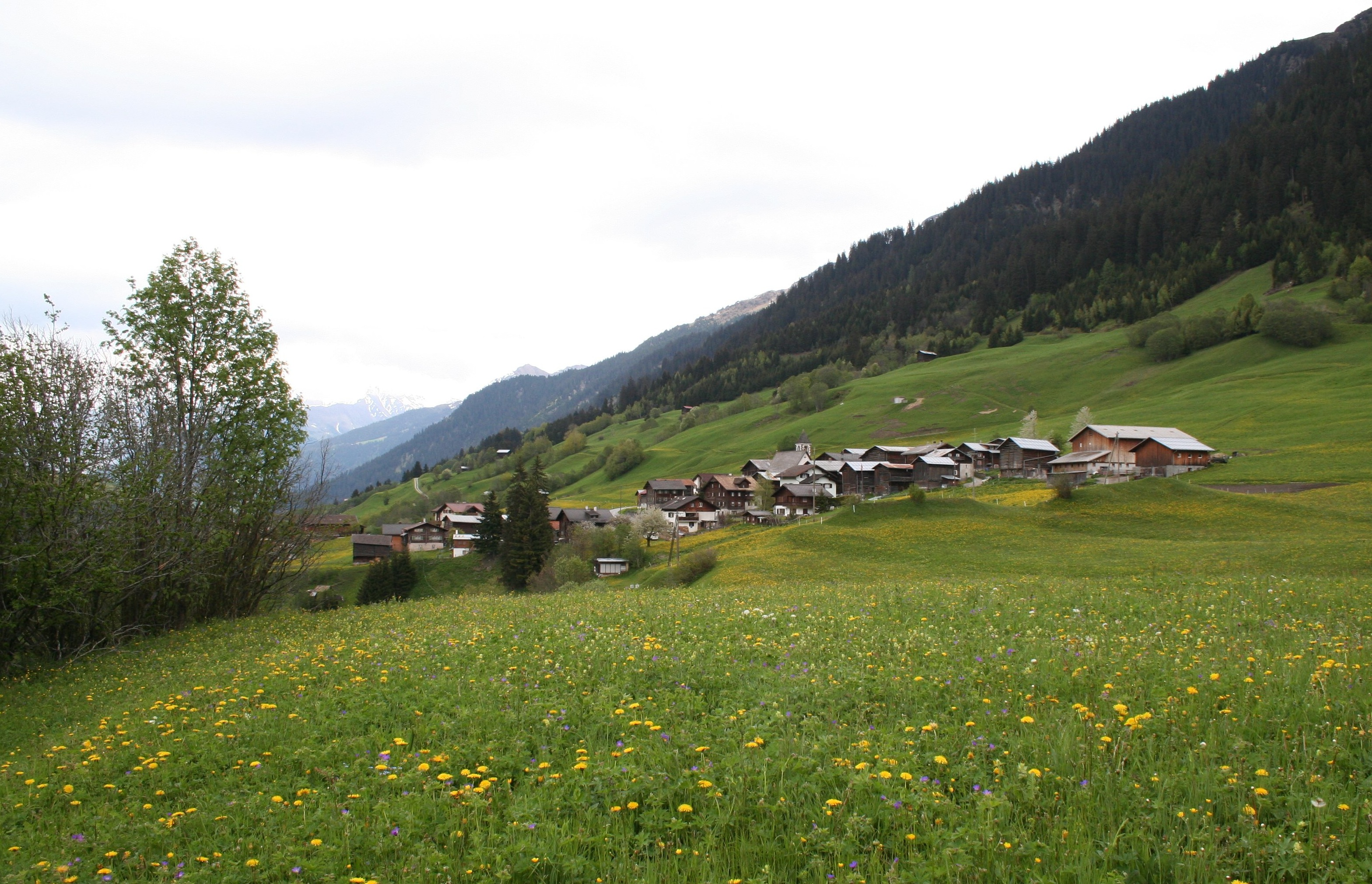
Surin hamlet

Lumbrein had an area, as of 2006, of 37.8 km^{2} (14.6 sq mi). Of this area, 47.2% is used for agricultural purposes, while 23.7% is forested. Of the rest of the land, 1.5% is settled (buildings or roads) and the remainder (27.6%) is non-productive (rivers, glaciers or mountains).

The former municipality is located in the Lugnez sub-district of the Surselva district, though until 2000 it was part of the Glenner district. It is located in the upper Lugnez valley. It consists of the village of Lumbrein (at an elevation of 1,405 m (4,610 ft) and the hamlets of St. Andriu, Nussaus on the road to Vrin and on the other side of the Glenner, Surin, Pruastg and Silgin (about 1,245 m (4,085 ft) elevation). In 1750 the villages of Molina and Curtinatsch left Lumbrein and in 1900 Farglix left.

== Coat of arms ==
The municipal coat of arms is Vert a Pale wavy Argent.

== Demographics ==
Lumbrein had a population (as of 2011) of 363. As of 2008, 2.3% of the population was made up of foreign nationals. Over the last 10 years the population has decreased at a rate of -11.3%. Most of the population (as of 2000) speaks Romansh (89.5%), with German being second most common ( 8.3%) and Portuguese being third ( 0.8%).

As of 2000, the gender distribution of the population was 49.5% male and 50.5% female. The age distribution, as of 2000, in Lumbrein is; 49 children or 12.3% of the population are between 0 and 9 years old and 57 teenagers or 14.3% are between 10 and 19. Of the adult population, 30 people or 7.5% of the population are between 20 and 29 years old. 48 people or 12.0% are between 30 and 39, 54 people or 13.5% are between 40 and 49, and 46 people or 11.5% are between 50 and 59. The senior population distribution is 47 people or 11.8% of the population are between 60 and 69 years old, 42 people or 10.5% are between 70 and 79, there are 25 people or 6.3% who are between 80 and 89 there is 1 person who is between 90 and 99.

In the 2007 federal election the most popular party was the CVP which received 63.6% of the vote. The next three most popular parties were the SVP (16.3%), the FDP (14.5%) and the SP (5%).

In Lumbrein about 53% of the population (between age 25–64) have completed either non-mandatory upper secondary education or additional higher education (either university or a Fachhochschule).

Lumbrein has an unemployment rate of 0.66%. As of 2005, there were 62 people employed in the primary economic sector and about 29 businesses involved in this sector. 28 people are employed in the secondary sector and there are 6 businesses in this sector. 45 people are employed in the tertiary sector, with 16 businesses in this sector.

The historical population is given in the following table:

year	population
1850	529
1900	531
1930	475
1950	584
2000	399

== Heritage sites of national significance ==
The Crestaulta and Cresta Petschna (a Bronze Age settlement), the necropolis at Surin and the double house at number 30 are listed as Swiss heritage sites of national significance.

Crestaulta is a significant Bronze Age site on a hill about 300 m (980 ft) west of Surin. It was discovered in 1935 and excavated by Walo Burkart in 1935–38. Three settlement phases were discovered. The bottom layer dates from the early Bronze Age (ca. 2000-1700/1600 BC) and included a number of post holes for simple huts with some attached animal stalls. The hut was about 6.5 by 4 meters (21 by 13 ft). The second layer dates from the middle Bronze Age (1700/1600-1500/1400 BC) and consists of massive dry stone walls, however there are no clear house or other building foundations. This layer also includes numerous animal stalls, a small round "cellar", part of a kiln and fire pits. The upper layer is also from the middle Bronze Age (1500/1400-1300 BC) and includes an animal stall, a menhir or standing stone and a wooden floor. Additional excavations have discovered ceramic pots of a style that is now known as the Inner-alpine Bronze Age culture (German: Inneralpinen Bronzezeit-Kultur) or formerly as the Crestaulta-Kultur.

In the river Cresta Petschna, about 150 m (490 ft) from Crestaulta a cemetery or necropolis was discovered in 1947. It included at least 11 early Bronze Age graves. The items buried in the graves (sewing needles, pendants and arm rings) indicate that these were women's graves.

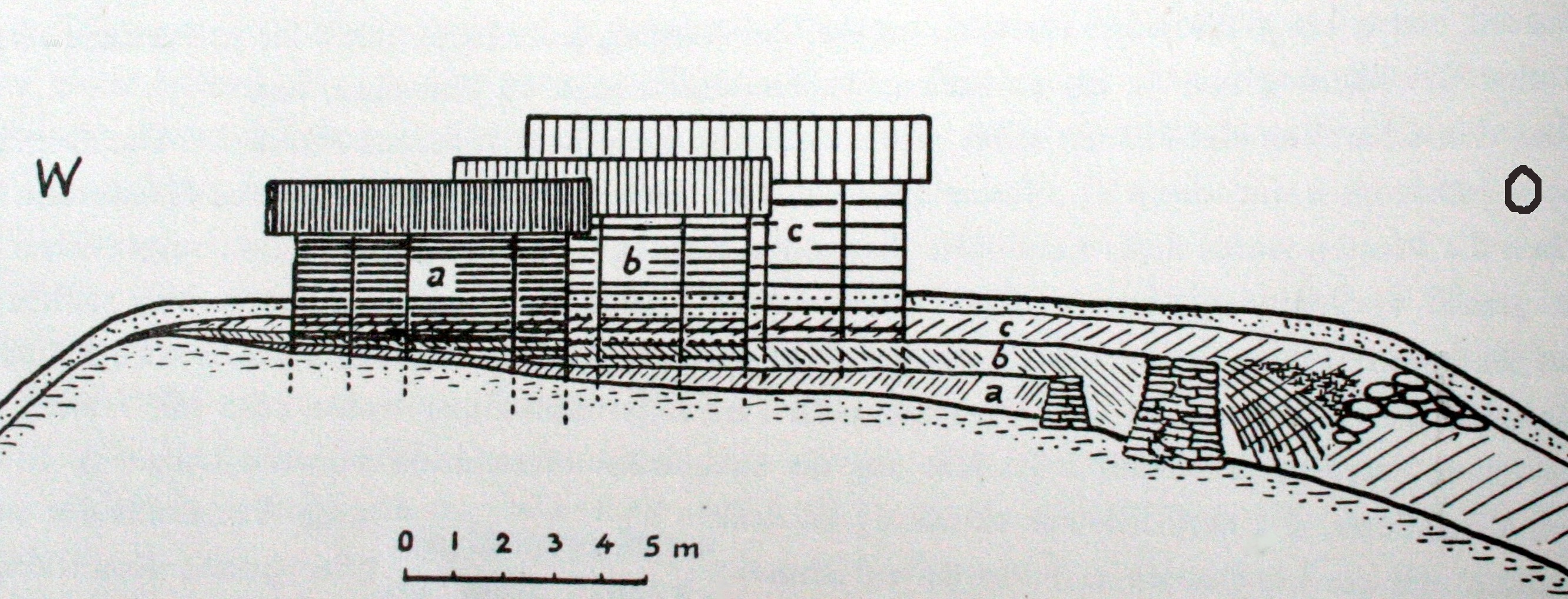
Buildings on the Crestaulta

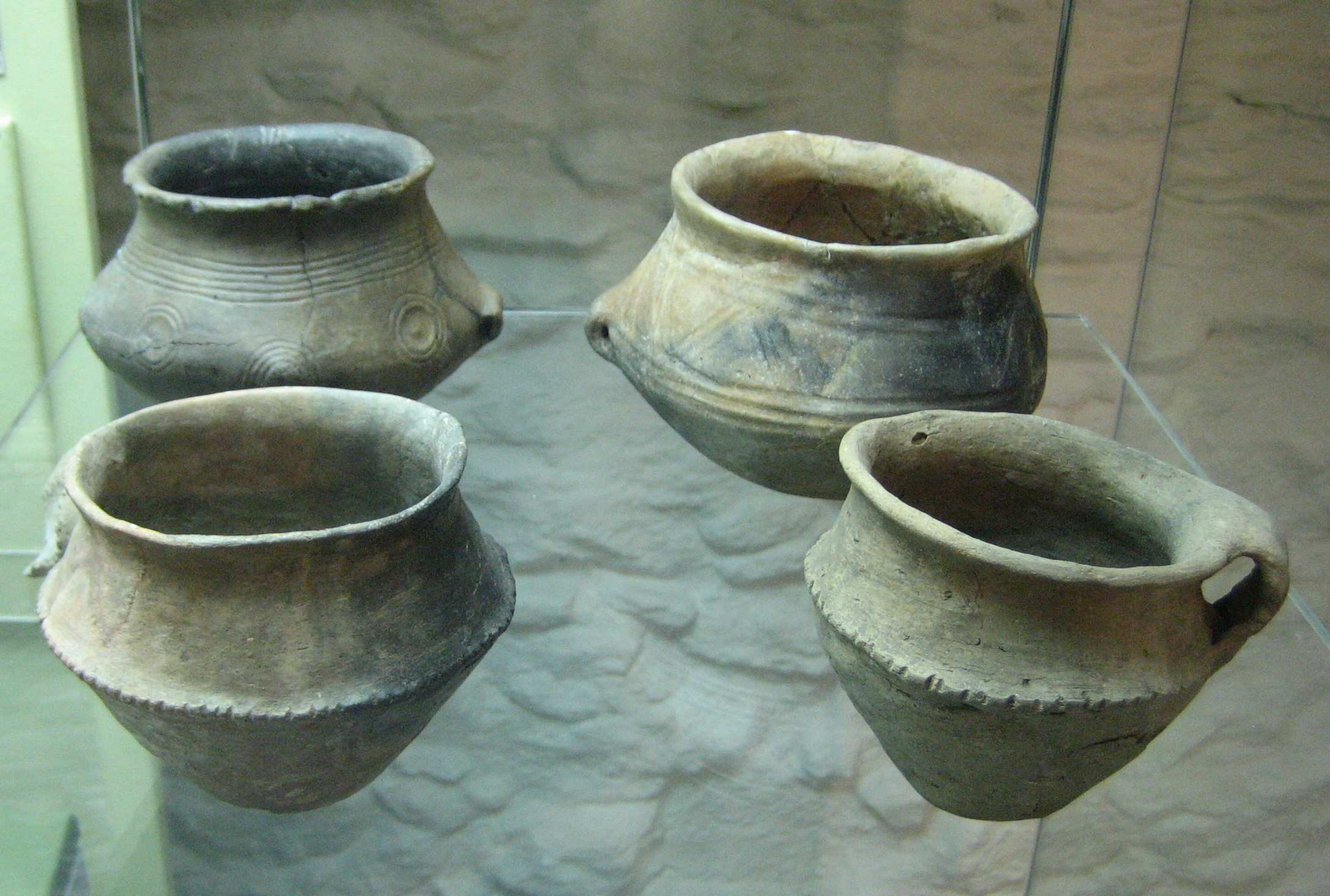
Ceramics from Crestaulta

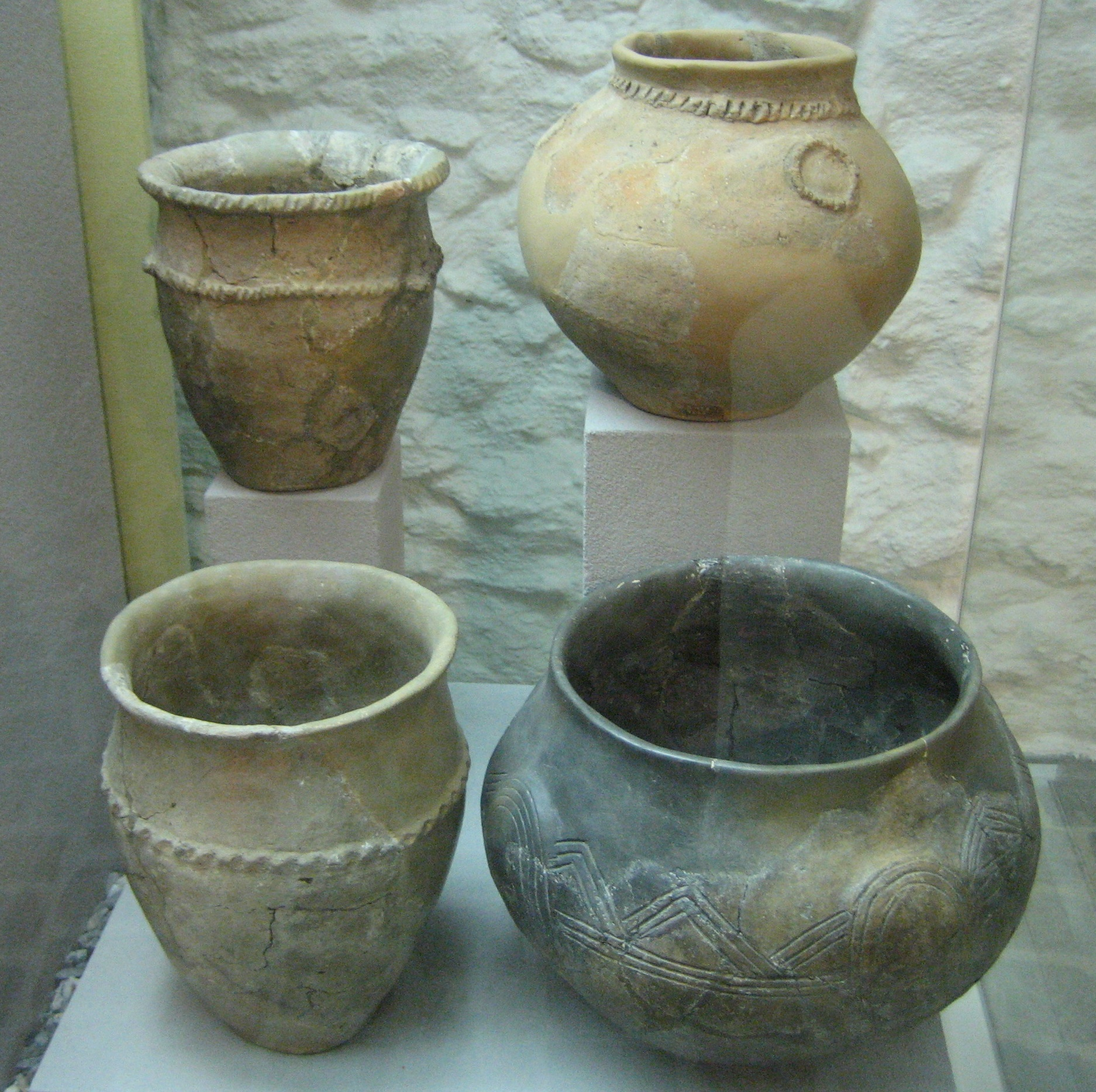
Ceramics from Crestaulta

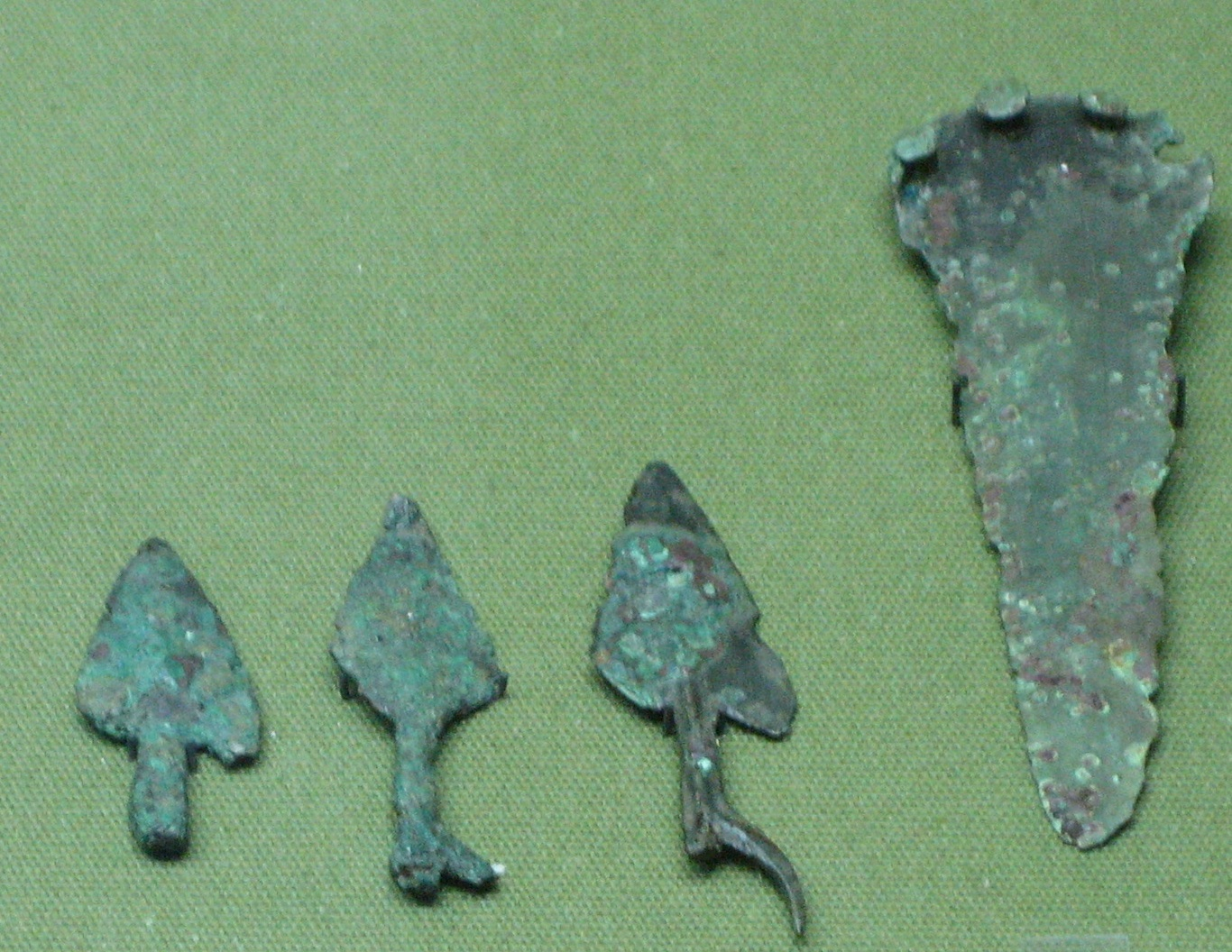
Spearheads from Crestaulta

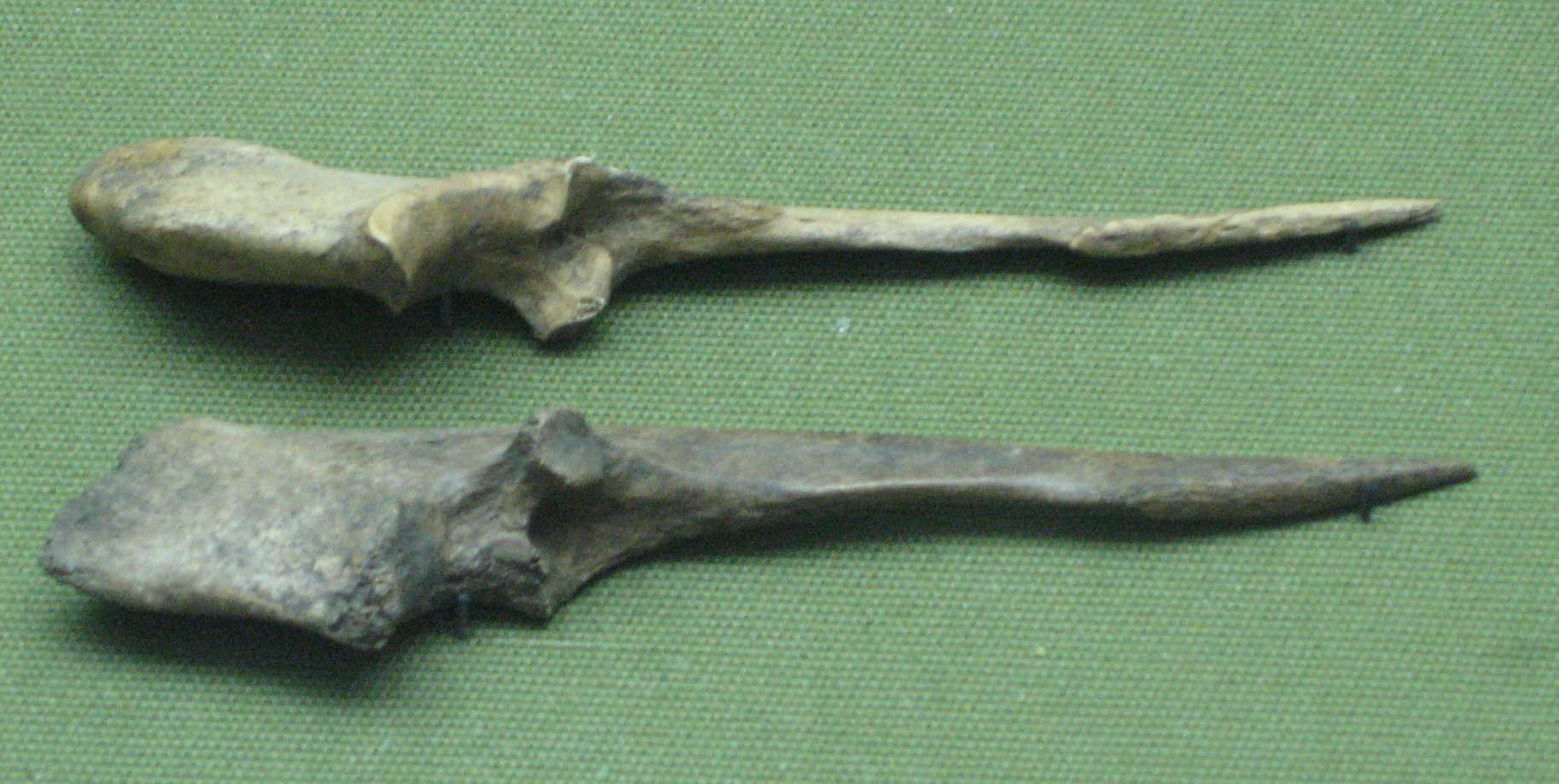
Needles from Crestaulta

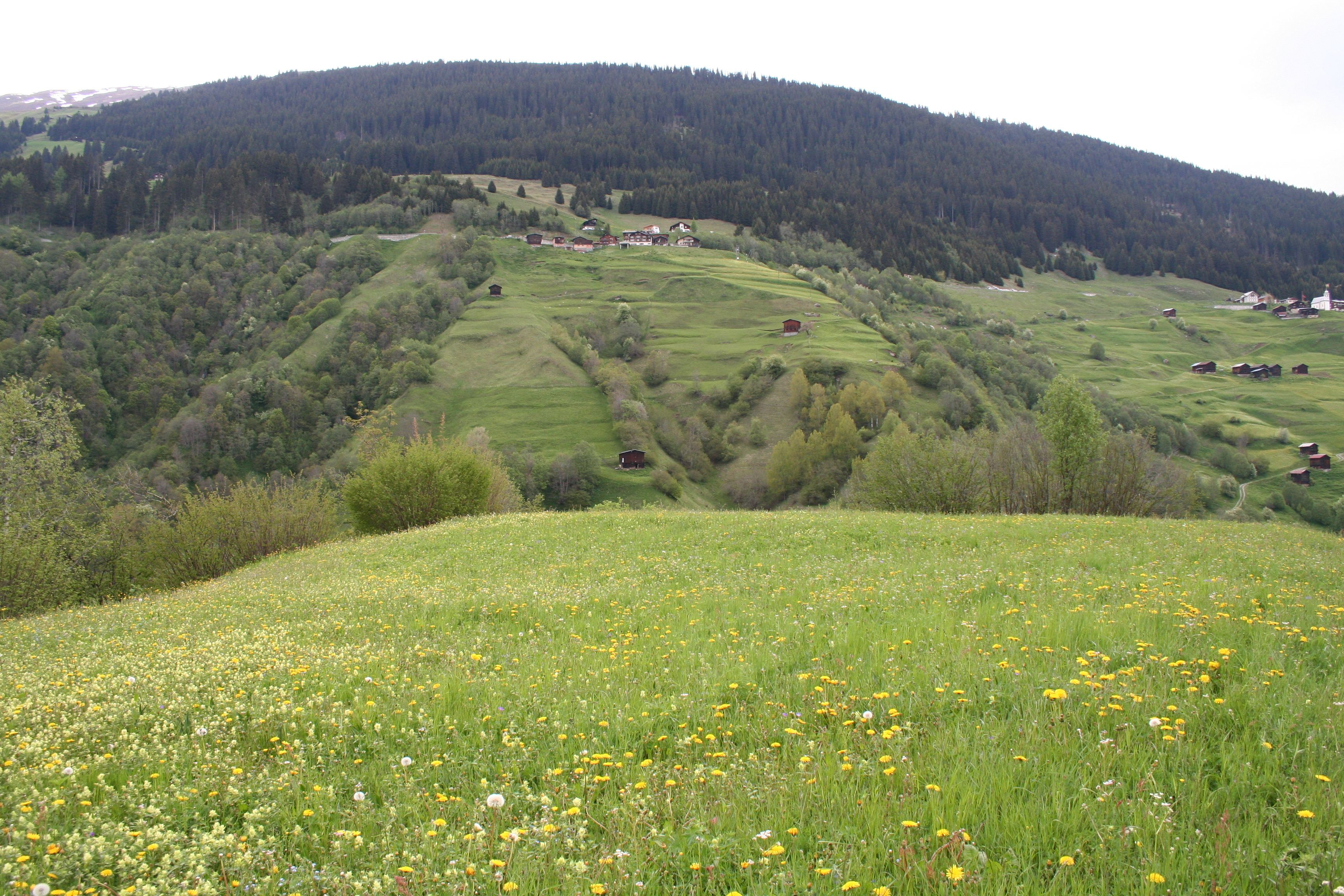
Crestaulta site
