= Cumbel =

- Former municipality
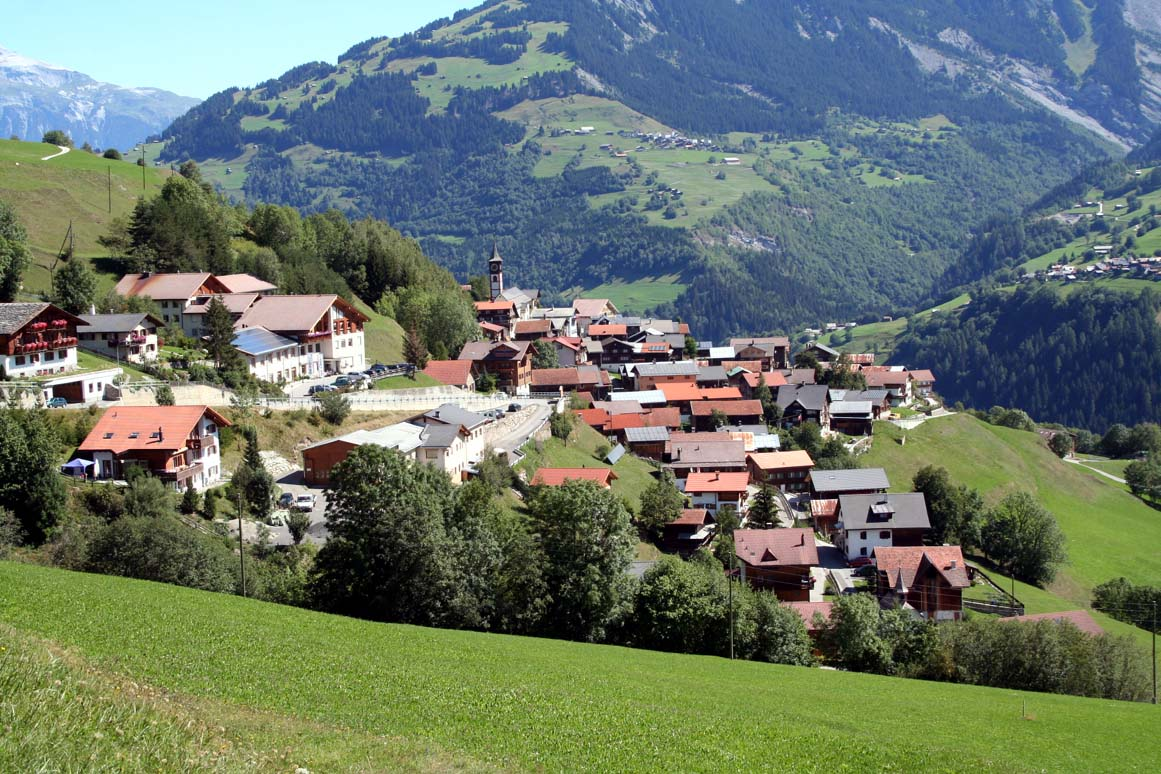

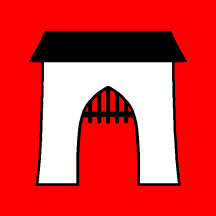
- Flag Coat of arms
- Location of Cumbel
- Location within Switzerland Location within Canton of Graubünden
- Coordinates: 46°43′N 9°11′E
- Country: Switzerland
- Canton: Graubünden
- District: Surselva

Area
  - Total: 4.46 km^{2} (1.72 sq mi)
- Elevation: 1,138 m (3,734 ft)

Population (Dec 2011)
  - Total: 238
  - Density: 53.4/km^{2} (138/sq mi)
- Time zone: UTC+01:00 (CET)
  - Summer (DST): UTC+02:00 (CEST)
- Postal code: 7142
- SFOS number: 3592
- ISO 3166 code: CH-GR
- Surrounded by: Duvin, Luven, Morissen, Pitasch, Sevgein, Suraua, Vella
- Website: www.cumbel.ch

Cumbel ([ˈkʊmbəl]) is a former municipality in the district of Surselva in the Swiss canton of Graubünden. The municipalities of Cumbel, Degen, Lumbrein, Morissen, Suraua, Vignogn, Vella, and Vrin merged on 1 January 2013 into the new municipality of Lumnezia.

== History ==
Cumbel is first mentioned about 825 as Cumble. Until 1983, the municipality was officially known as Cumbels.

== Coat of arms ==
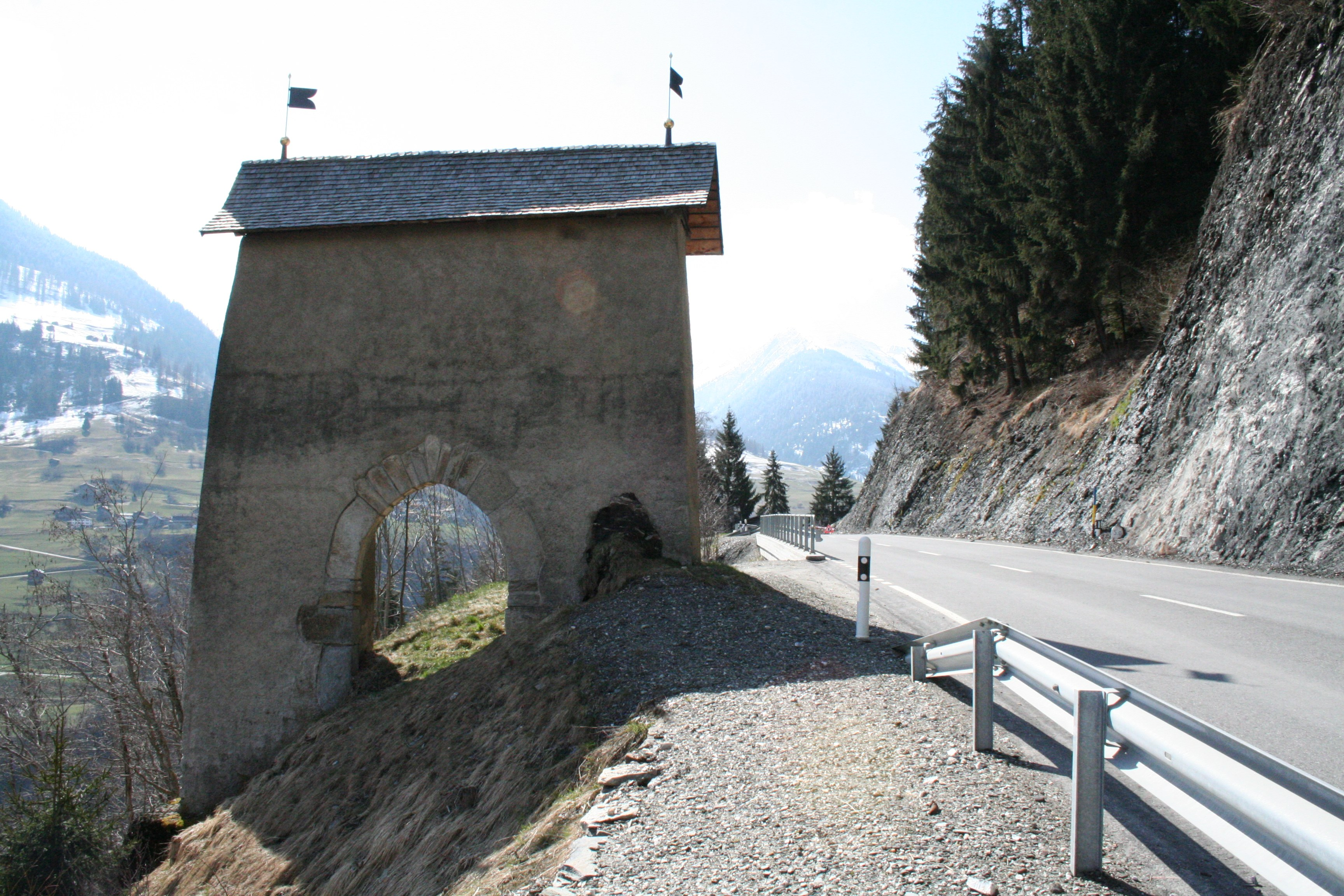
The women's gate (Porclas Cumbel) as it currently appears

The description of the municipal coats of arms is Gules the Women's Gate Argent with roof and open portcullis Sable.

The women's gate (Porclas Cumbel) is the most important monument of the valley. It owes its name to the legendary battle of the women of Lugnez, in the feud between Werdenberg and Belmont.

== Geography ==
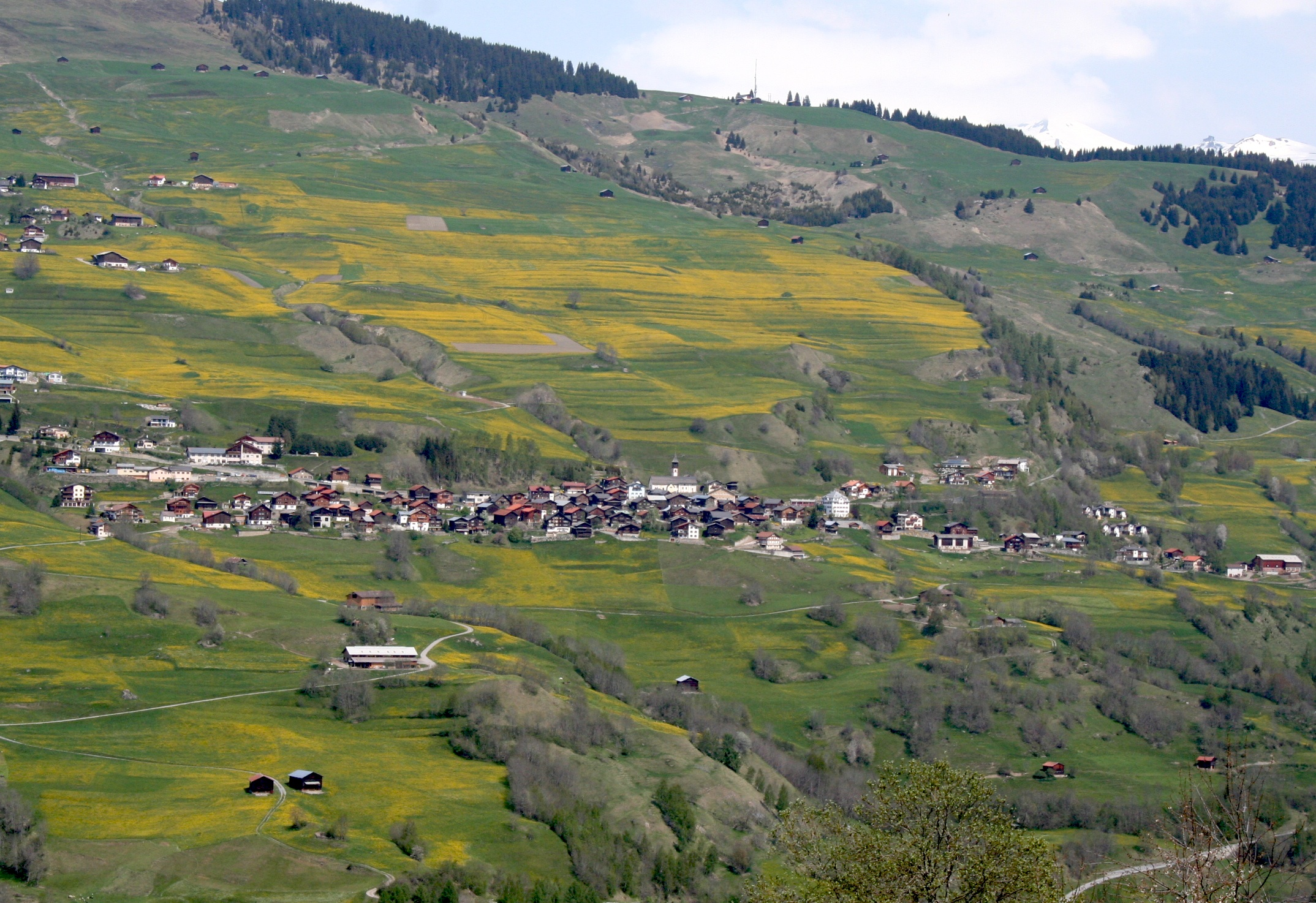
Village of Cumbel

Cumbel had an area, as of 2006, of 4.5 km^{2} (1.7 sq mi). Of this area, 46.5% is used for agricultural purposes, while 45.6% is forested. Of the rest of the land, 5.4% is settled (buildings or roads) and the remainder (2.5%) is non-productive (rivers, glaciers or mountains).

The former municipality is located in the Lugnez sub-district of the Surselva district at the entrance to the Lugnez valley. It consists of the linear village of Cumbel.

== Demographics ==
Cumbel has a population (as of 2011) of 238. As of 2008, 2.8% of the population was made up of foreign nationals. Over the last 10 years the population has decreased at a rate of -6.6%. Most of the population (as of 2000) speaks Romansh(85.1%), with German being second most common (12.8%) and Portuguese being third ( 0.7%).

As of 2000, the gender distribution of the population was 51.3% male and 48.7% female. The age distribution, as of 2000, in Cumbel is; 46 children or 16.0% of the population are between 0 and 9 years old and 25 teenagers or 8.7% are between 10 and 19. Of the adult population, 18 people or 6.3% of the population are between 20 and 29 years old. 39 people or 13.5% are between 30 and 39, 30 people or 10.4% are between 40 and 49, and 21 people or 7.3% are between 50 and 59. The senior population distribution is 23 people or 8.0% of the population are between 60 and 69 years old, 45 people or 15.6% are between 70 and 79, there are 31 people or 10.8% who are between 80 and 89 there are 10 people or 3.5% who are between 90 and 99.

In the 2007 federal election the most popular party was the CVP which received 51.7% of the vote. The next two most popular parties were the SVP (23.6%) and the FDP (10.2%).

In Cumbel about 56.1% of the population (between age 25-64) have completed either non-mandatory upper secondary education or additional higher education (either University or a Fachhochschule).

Cumbel has an unemployment rate of 0.67%. As of 2005, there were 24 people employed in the primary economic sector and about 10 businesses involved in this sector. 24 people are employed in the secondary sector and there are 3 businesses in this sector. 91 people are employed in the tertiary sector, with 10 businesses in this sector.

The historical population is given in the following table:

year	population
1850	278
1900	342
1910	275
1941	331
1950	298
1990	257
2000	288
