= Degen, Switzerland =

Degen
- Former municipality
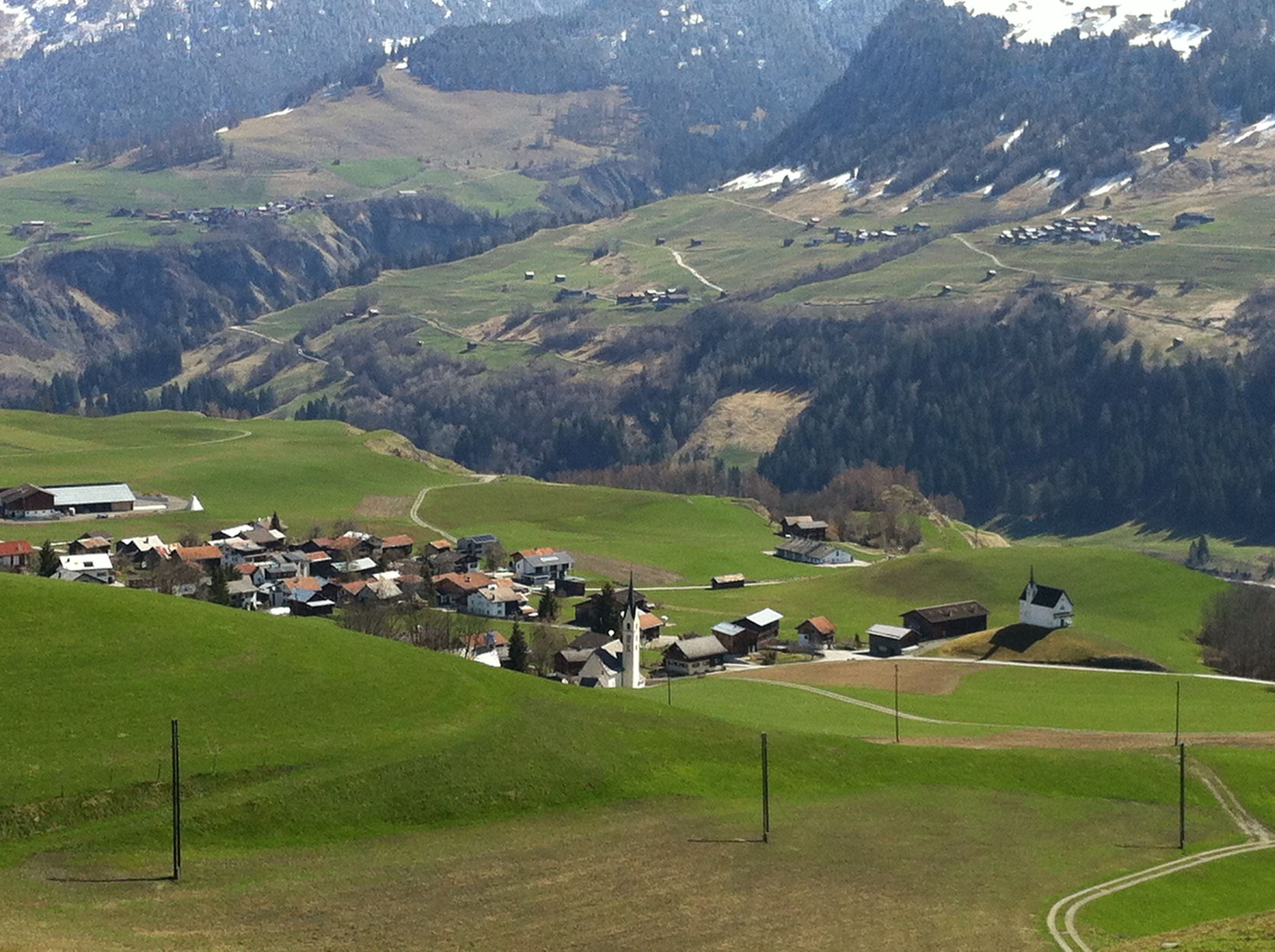
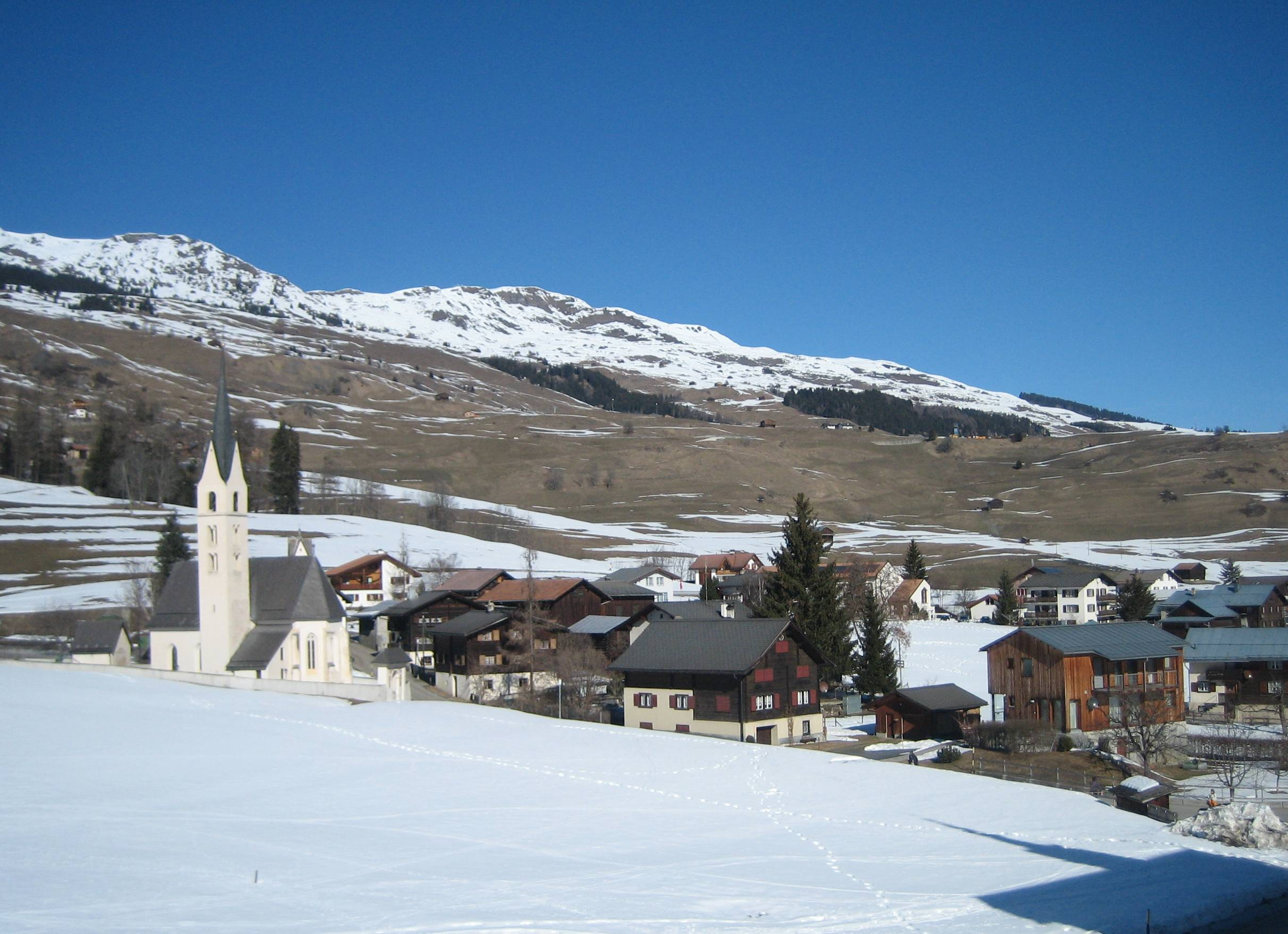

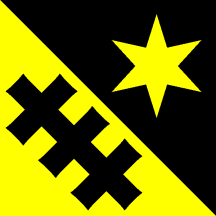
- Flag Coat of arms
- Location of Degen
- Location within Switzerland Location within Canton of Graubünden
- Coordinates: 46°42′N 9°10′E
- Country: Switzerland
- Canton: Graubünden
- District: Surselva

Area
  - Total: 6.72 km^{2} (2.59 sq mi)
- Elevation: 1,122 m (3,681 ft)

Population (Dec 2011)
  - Total: 235
  - Density: 35.0/km^{2} (90.6/sq mi)
- Time zone: UTC+01:00 (CET)
  - Summer (DST): UTC+02:00 (CEST)
- Postal code: 7145
- SFOS number: 3594
- ISO 3166 code: CH-GR
- Surrounded by: Vella, Vignogn, Suraua, Obersaxen.
- Website: www.lumnezia.ch

Degen ([ˈdeɟən], German: Igels) is a former municipality in the district of Surselva in the Swiss canton of Graubünden. Until 1983, it was officially known as Igels. The municipalities of Cumbel, Degen, Lumbrein, Morissen, Suraua, Vignogn, Vella, and Vrin merged on 1 January 2013 into the new municipality of Lumnezia.

== History ==
Degen is first mentioned about 840 as Higenae/Egenae. Rumein was mentioned at about the same time as villa Ramnensis, and in 1325 Vattiz was mentioned as Vatigis.

== Geography ==
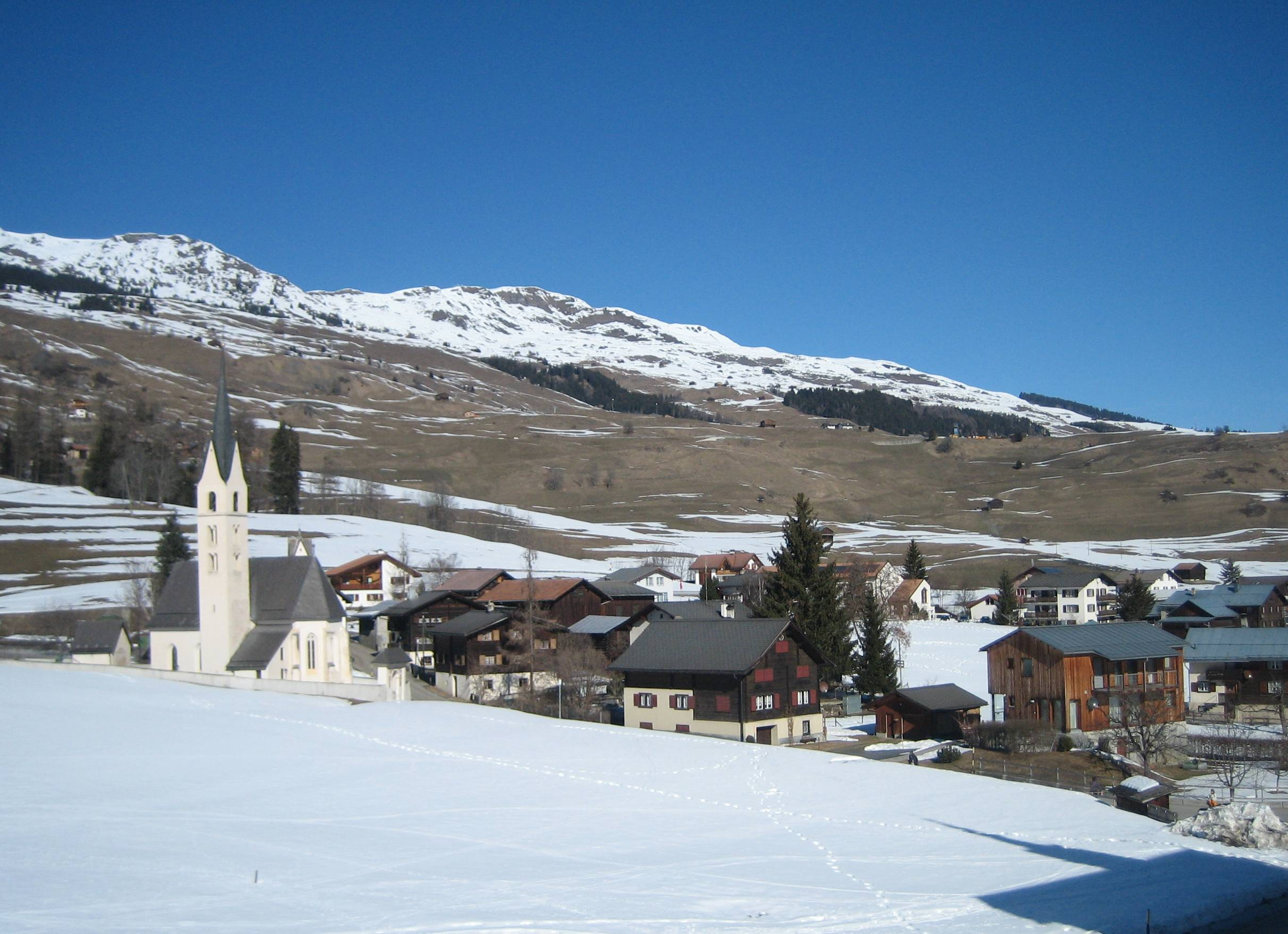
Degen village

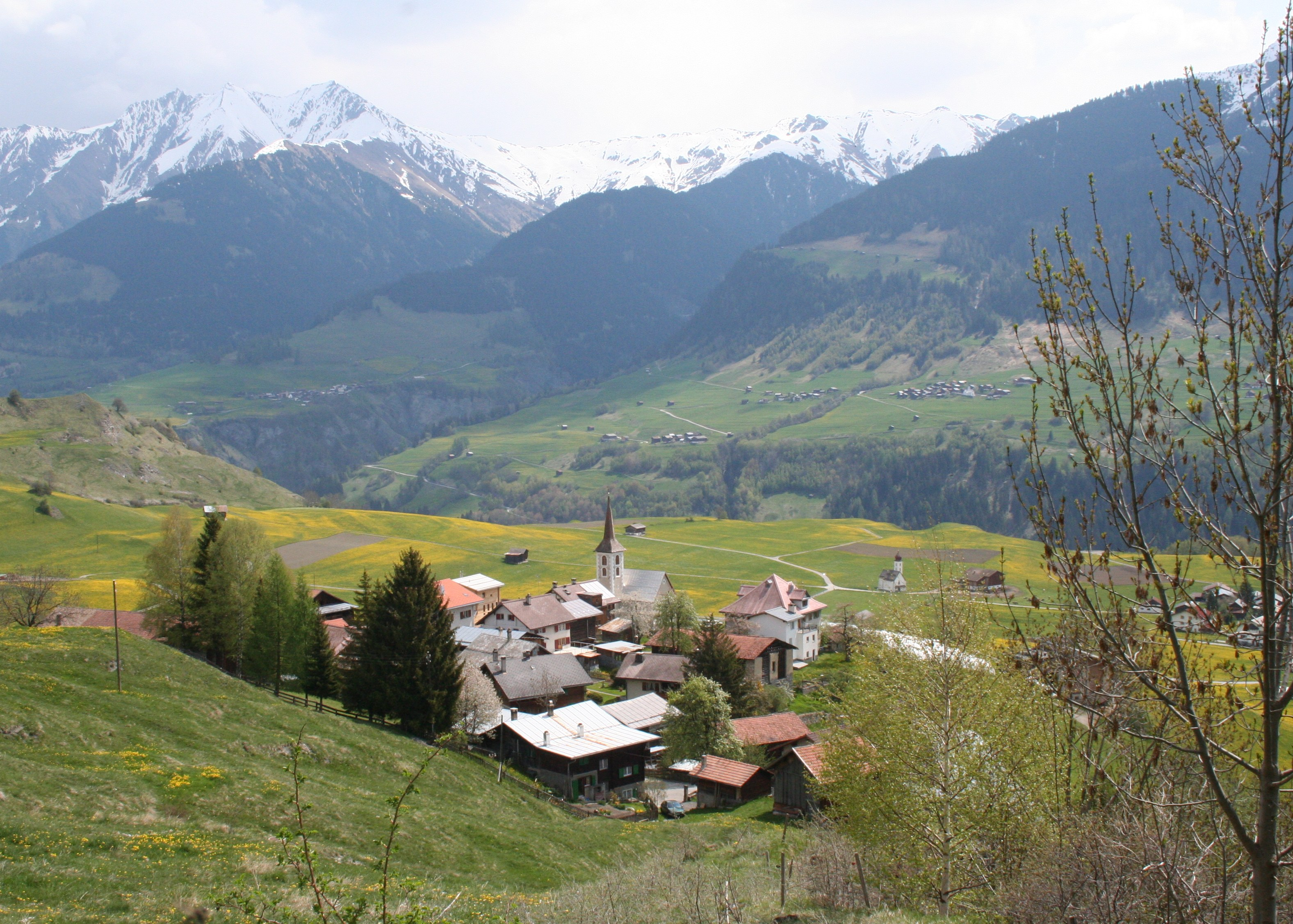
Rumein hamlet

Degen had an area, as of 2006, of 6.8 km^{2} (2.6 sq mi). Of this area, 78.1% is used for agricultural purposes, while 10.9% is forested. Of the rest of the land, 4% is settled (buildings or roads) and the remainder (7%) is non-productive (rivers, glaciers or mountains).

The former municipality is located in the Lugnez sub-district of the Surselva district. It is on a terrace about 200 m (660 ft) above the Glenner valley floor. It consists of the village of Degen and the hamlets of Rumein und Vattiz.

== Coat of arms ==
The municipal coat of arms is Per bend Sable a Mullet Or and of the last a Bend embattled bretessé Sable in bend couped of the first.

== Demographics ==
Degen had a population (as of 2011) of 235. As of 2008, 5.3% of the population was made up of foreign nationals. Over the last 10 years the population has decreased at a rate of -14.6%. Most of the population (as of 2000) speaks Romansh(73.7%), with German being second most common (20.6%) and Albanian being third ( 3.6%).

As of 2000, the gender distribution of the population was 53.8% male and 46.2% female. The age distribution, as of 2000, in Degen is; 30 children or 12.1% of the population are between 0 and 9 years old and 34 teenagers or 13.8% are between 10 and 19. Of the adult population, 15 people or 6.1% of the population are between 20 and 29 years old. 34 people or 13.8% are between 30 and 39, 36 people or 14.6% are between 40 and 49, and 40 people or 16.2% are between 50 and 59. The senior population distribution is 28 people or 11.3% of the population are between 60 and 69 years old, 16 people or 6.5% are between 70 and 79, there are 12 people or 4.9% who are between 80 and 89 there are 2 people or 0.8% who are between 90 and 99.

In the 2007 federal election the most popular party was the CVP which received 60.8% of the vote. The next three most popular parties were the SVP (16.2%), the FDP (14.9%) and the SP (8.1%).

The entire Swiss population is generally well educated. In Degen about 59.7% of the population (between age 25-64) have completed either non-mandatory upper secondary education or additional higher education (either University or a Fachhochschule).

Degen has an unemployment rate of 0.4%. As of 2005, there were 42 people employed in the primary economic sector and about 23 businesses involved in this sector. 17 people are employed in the secondary sector and there are 3 businesses in this sector. 18 people are employed in the tertiary sector, with 10 businesses in this sector.

=== Population change ===
Population change in Degen
Year	1808	1850	1900	1950	2000
Population	232	255	214	323	247

== Heritage sites of national significance ==
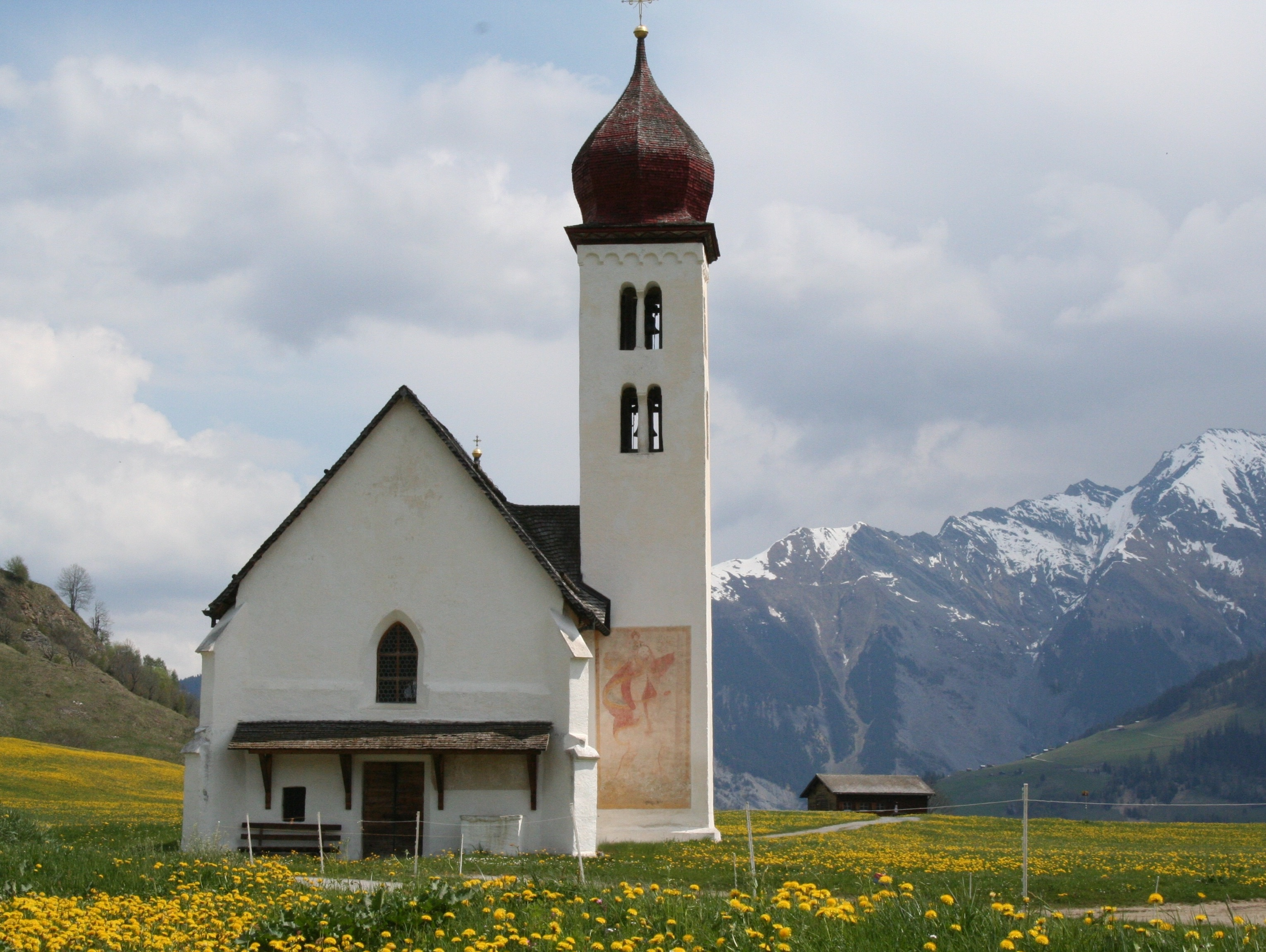
Chapel of St. Sebastian

The Chapel of St. Sebastian is listed as a Swiss heritage site of national significance.
