= St. Martin, Graubünden =

St. Martin
- Former municipality
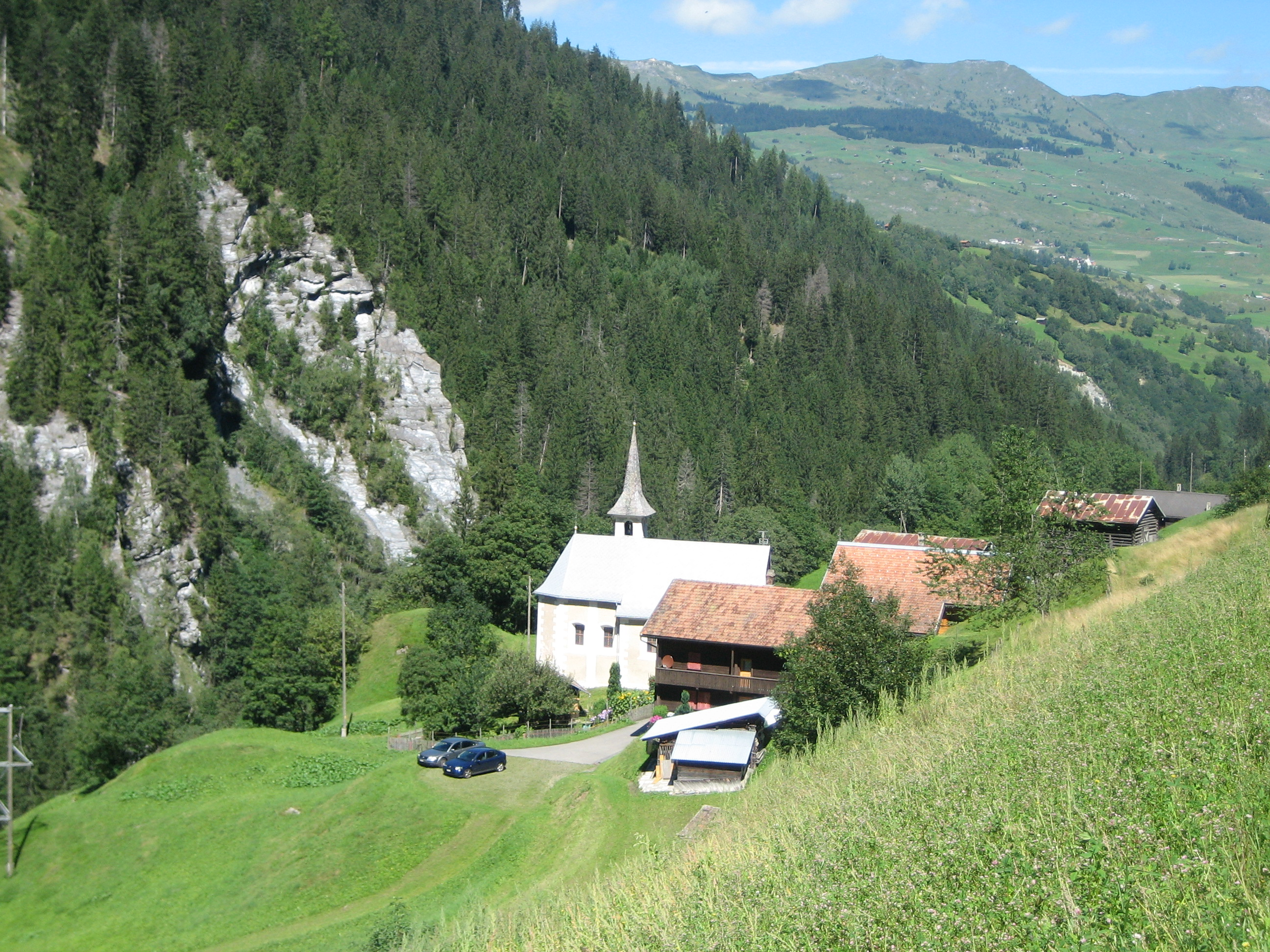

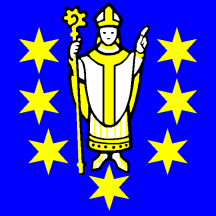
- Flag Coat of arms
- Location of St. Martin
- Location within Switzerland Location within Canton of Graubünden
- Coordinates: 46°40′N 9°10′E
- Country: Switzerland
- Canton: Graubünden
- District: Surselva

Area
  - Total: 22.93 km^{2} (8.85 sq mi)
- Elevation: 1,003 m (3,291 ft)

Population (Dec 2013)
  - Total: 35
  - Density: 1.5/km^{2} (4.0/sq mi)
- Time zone: UTC+01:00 (CET)
  - Summer (DST): UTC+02:00 (CEST)
- Postal code: 7116
- SFOS number: 3598
- ISO 3166 code: CH-GR
- Surrounded by: Duvin, Lumbrein, Safien, Suraua, Vals, Vignogn
- Website: SFSO statistics

St. Martin (Swiss Standard German pronunciation: [zaŋkt ˈmartiːn], sometimes spelled in full as Sankt Martin; Romansh: Sogn Martin) is a village and was a municipality in the district of Surselva in the Swiss canton of Graubünden. On 1 January 2015 the former municipality of St. Martin merged into the municipality of Vals.

== History ==
The village was settled around the 14th Century by Walser immigrants. Initially it was a held in fief for the Bishop of Chur by the von Tersnaus and von Mont families. In 1457 the German-speaking population was forbidden from purchasing land or marrying in the neighboring village of Tersnaus. The village church (consecrated 1345) was initially under the parish church of St. Vinzenz in Pleif (in Vella municipality), but in 1528 came under the authority of Tersnaus. After 1776, St. Martin's village church had a German-speaking Prebend though in 1868 it fell back under the authority of Tersnaus.

By 1671 the farm houses of St. Martin were a neighborhood in Tersnaus, and in 1878 the municipality separated from Tersnaus to become politically independent. The municipality remained firmly rural, and in 1972-73 became the last municipality in Switzerland to be connected to the electric grid.

== Coat of arms ==
The municipal coat of arms is Azure, Sankt Martin statant clad as bishop argent and or holding in his dexter hand a crosier and his sinister hand raised in blessing, between seven mullets of the last. Sankt Martin represents the name of the municipality, while the seven stars represent the seven hamlets that make up the municipality.

== Geography ==
Before the merger, St. Martin had a total area of 22.9 km^{2} (8.8 mi^{2}). Of this area, 29% is used for agricultural purposes, while 32.5% is forested. Of the rest of the land, 0.3% is settled (buildings or roads) and the remainder (38.2%) is non-productive (rivers, glaciers or mountains).

The municipality is located in the Lugnez sub-district of the Surselva district. It is a scattered settlement on the steep slopes above both sides of the Valser Rhine canyon at an elevation of between 1,000 and 1,700 meters (3,300 and 5,600 ft). The majority German speaking village marks the language border between German and Romansh in the valley. It consists of hamlets of St. Martin, Lunschania (post office), Bucarischuna, Munt, Gadenstatt, Mariaga and Travisasch. The additional hamlets of Feistenberg, Haspel and Montaschg are all abandoned.

== Demographics ==
St. Martin had a population (as of 2013) of 35, all Swiss citizens. Over the last 10 years the population has decreased at a rate of -6.8%. Most of the population (as of 2000) speaks German (86.1%), with the rest speaking Romansh (13.9%).

As of 2000, the gender distribution of the population was 48.8% male and 51.2% female. The age distribution, as of 2002, in St. Martin is: 7 children or 19.4% of the population are between 0 and 9 years old and 4 teenagers or 11.1% are between 10 and 19. Of the adult population, nobody was between 20 and 29 years old. 6 people or 16.7% are between 30 and 39, 6 people or 16.7% are between 40 and 49, and 3 people or 8.3% are between 50 and 59. The senior population distribution is 3 people or 8.3% of the population are between 60 and 69 years old, 5 people or 13.9% are between 70 and 79, there is 1 person who is between 80 and 89, and there is 1 person who is between 90 and 99.

In the 2007 federal election the most popular party was the CVP which received 67.3% of the vote. The next three most popular parties were the FDP (20%), the SVP (12.7%) and the SP (0%).

In St. Martin about 40% of the population (between age 25-64) have completed either non-mandatory upper secondary education or additional higher education (either university or a Fachhochschule).

St. Martin has an unemployment rate of 0%. As of 2005, there were 13 people employed in the primary economic sector and about 7 businesses involved in this sector. 1 person is employed in the secondary sector and there is 1 business in this sector. No one is employed in the tertiary sector.

The historical population is given in the following table:

year	population
1800	139
1880	150
1900	99
1941	83
1950	112
2000	36
