= Vignogn =

- Former municipality
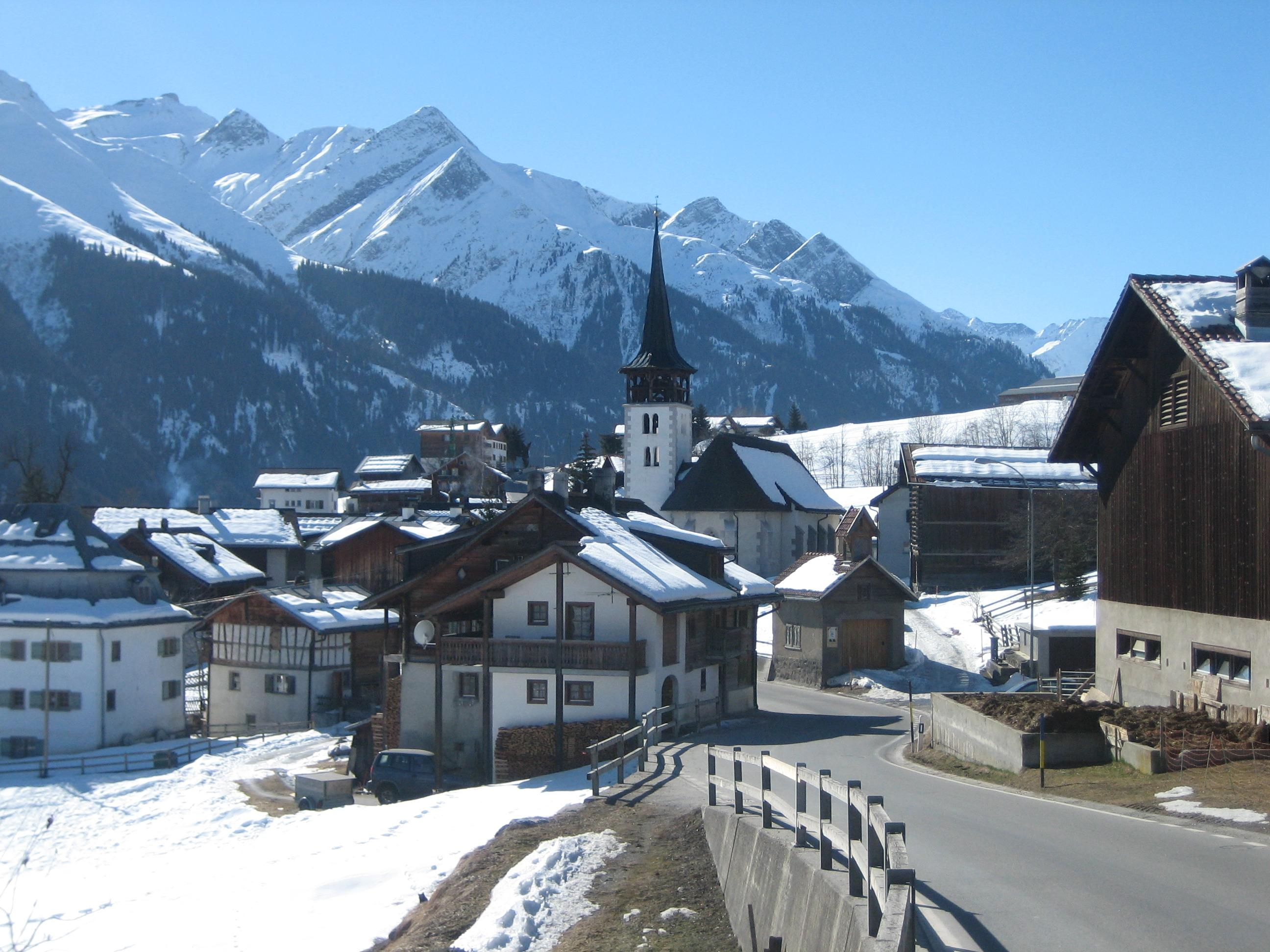

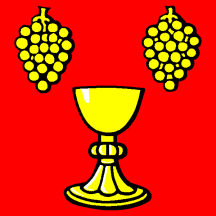
- Flag Coat of arms
- Location of Vignogn
- Location within Switzerland Location within Canton of Graubünden
- Coordinates: 46°41′N 9°09′E
- Country: Switzerland
- Canton: Graubünden
- District: Surselva

Area
  - Total: 7.38 km^{2} (2.85 sq mi)
- Elevation: 1,239 m (4,065 ft)

Population (Dec 2011)
  - Total: 170
  - Density: 23/km^{2} (60/sq mi)
- Time zone: UTC+01:00 (CET)
  - Summer (DST): UTC+02:00 (CEST)
- Postal code: 7147
- SFOS number: 3604
- ISO 3166 code: CH-GR
- Surrounded by: Degen, Lumbrein, Obersaxen, Sankt Martin, Suraua
- Website: www.vallumnezia.ch

Vignogn is a former municipality in the district of Surselva in the canton of Graubünden in Switzerland. The municipalities of Cumbel, Degen, Lumbrein, Morissen, Suraua, Vignogn, Vella, and Vrin merged on 1 January 2013 into the new municipality of Lumnezia.

== History ==
Vignogn is first mentioned in 1325 as Vinanne. In 1469 it was mentioned as Viends.

== Geography ==
Vignogn had an area, as of 2006, of 7.9 km^{2} (3.1 sq mi). Of this area, 57.4% is used for agricultural purposes, while 31.3% is forested. Of the rest of the land, 2.7% is settled (buildings or roads) and the remainder (8.6%) is non-productive (rivers, glaciers or mountains).

The former municipality is located in the Lugnez sub-district of the Surselva district. It consists of the linear village of Vignogn at an elevation of 1,241 m (4,072 ft) at the foot of the Piz Sezner. Until 1983 Vignogn was known as Vigens.

== Demographics ==
Vignogn had a population (as of 2011) of 170. As of 2008, 0.6% of the population was made up of foreign nationals. Over the last 10 years the population has decreased at a rate of -14%. Most of the population (as of 2000) speaks Romansh (88.8%), with German being second most common (10.1%) and French being third ( 0.6%).

As of 2000, the gender distribution of the population was 53.0% male and 47.0% female. The age distribution, as of 2000, in Vignogn is; 11 children or 6.1% of the population are between 0 and 9 years old and 21 teenagers or 11.7% are between 10 and 19. Of the adult population, 26 people or 14.5% of the population are between 20 and 29 years old. 13 people or 7.3% are between 30 and 39, 22 people or 12.3% are between 40 and 49, and 37 people or 20.7% are between 50 and 59. The senior population distribution is 27 people or 15.1% of the population are between 60 and 69 years old, 8 people or 4.5% are between 70 and 79, there are 11 people or 6.1% who are between 80 and 89, and there are 3 people or 1.7% who are between 90 and 99.

In the 2007 federal election the most popular party was the CVP which received 71.4% of the vote. The next three most popular parties were the SVP (13.4%), the FDP (8.7%) and the SP (6.5%).

In Vignogn about 55.1% of the population (between age 25–64) have completed either non-mandatory upper secondary education or additional higher education (either university or a Fachhochschule).

Vignogn has an unemployment rate of 1.06%. As of 2005, there were 36 people employed in the primary economic sector and about 15 businesses involved in this sector. 8 people are employed in the secondary sector and there are 3 businesses in this sector. 18 people are employed in the tertiary sector, with 8 businesses in this sector.

The historical population is given in the following table:

year	population
1850	199
1900	134
1950	204
2000	179

== Notable residents ==
- Carmen Casanova, Women's Alpine Skier (born 1980 in Vignogn)
