= Surselva Region =

Coordinates: 46.76°N 9.09°E

Surselva Region Regiun Surselva (Romansh) Region Surselva (German)
- District
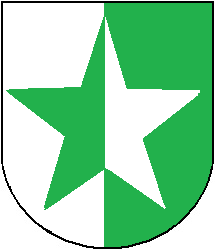
- Flag Coat of arms
- Country: Switzerland
- Canton: Graubünden

Area
  - Total: 1,373.56 km^{2} (530.33 sq mi)

Population (2020)
  - Total: 21,318
  - Density: 15.520/km^{2} (40.197/sq mi)
- Time zone: UTC+1 (CET)
  - Summer (DST): UTC+2 (CEST)
- Municipalities: 15

Surselva Region is one of the eleven administrative districts in the canton of Graubünden in Switzerland. It was created on 1 January 2017 as part of a reorganization of the canton.

Surselva Region has an area of 1,373.56 square kilometers (530.33 sq mi), with a population of 21,318 as of 31 December 2020. Its area corresponds exactly to that of its predecessor, Surselva District, but all of its former subdistricts (Kreise) – Disentis, Ilanz, Lumnezia/Lugnez, Ruis and Safien – have politically ceased to exist.

Surselva (literally, 'above the forest') is the name of the valley of the Anterior Rhine in the local (Sursilvan) dialect of Romansh. The eponymous forest is that of the Flims rockslide; the region "below the forest" is Sutselva, where the Sutsilvan dialect used to be spoken.

== Geography ==
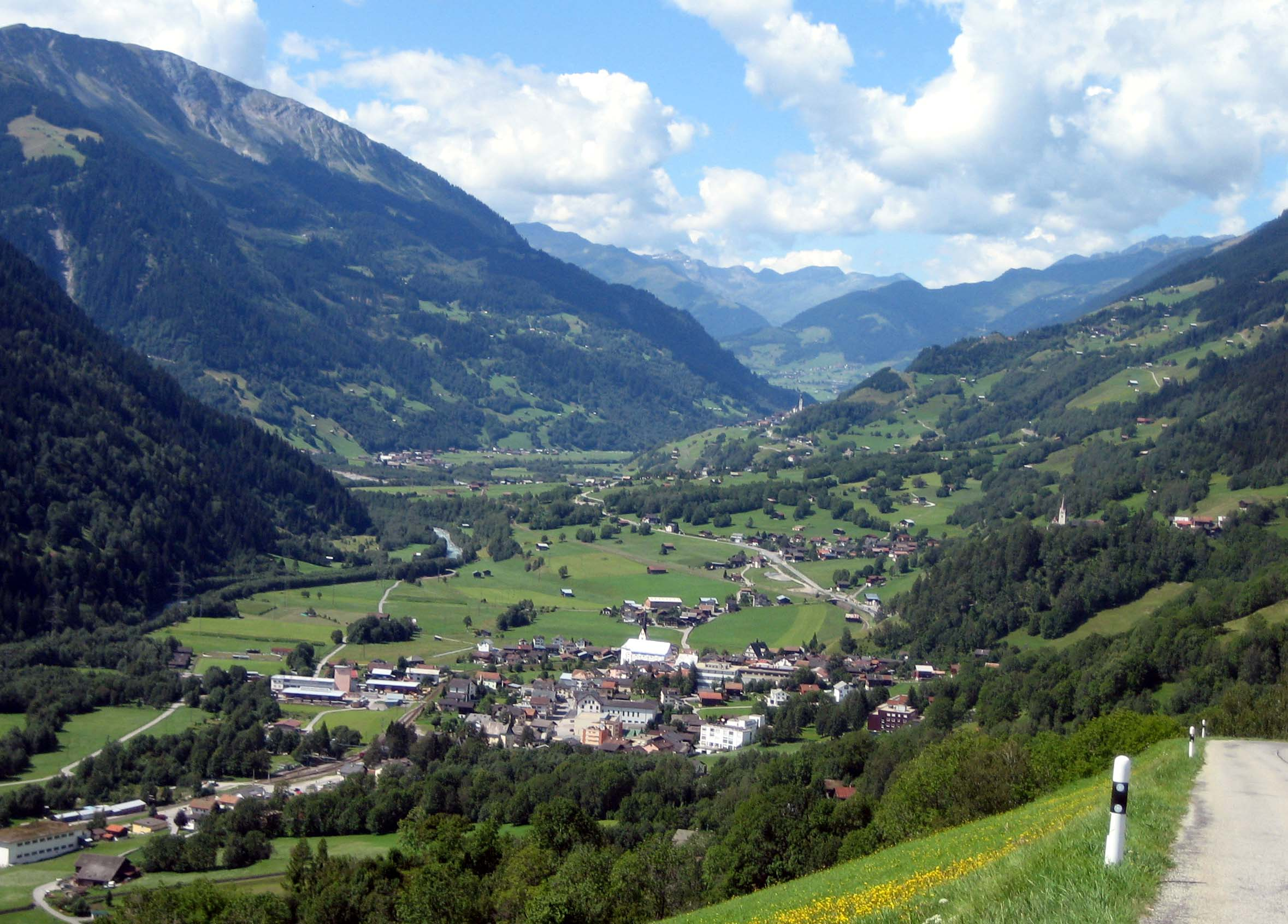
The Surselva near Trun

The Surselva encompasses the valley of the Vorderrhein/Rein Anteriur (the Surselva) and all its side valleys, from the source near the Oberalp Pass all the way down towards Reichenau (where the Vorderrhein joins the Hinterrhein/Rein Posteriur to form the Alpine Rhine). The region ends before that confluence at the huge forest on the giant debris of Flims Rockslide that is responsible for the name of the region: The debris area lack of water and soil and were ever left as a big forest as it was useless for farming. This forest (Romansh: silva) is the border for Sur-silva (meaning 'above the forest').

The Surselva is one of the few areas in Switzerland that is mainly Romansh-speaking (another notable valley being the Engadine, the valley of the Inn). The most important community in the Surselva is Disentis/Mustér, with its Benedictine monastery, which dates back to 720. There are a few German-speaking communities in the Surselva, e.g. Obersaxen and Vals, which were founded in the thirteenth century by the Walser.

A long-distance hike is signposted to follow the full length of the main valley of the Anterior Rhine.

== Municipalities ==
Surselva Region had 17 municipalities at the time of its formation. On 1 January 2018 the former municipalities of Andiast and Waltensburg/Vuorz merged into the municipality of Breil/Brigels, for a total of 15 municipalities.

| Municipality | Population (31 December 2020) | Area (km^{2}) |
|---|---|---|
| Falera | 625 | 22.36 |
| Laax | 1,974 | 31.71 |
| Sagogn | 736 | 6.92 |
| Schluein | 611 | 4.79 |
| Vals | 946 | 175.56 |
| Lumnezia | 1,996 | 165.48 |
| Ilanz/Glion | 4,797 | 133.48 |
| Safiental | 937 | 151.42 |
| Breil/Brigels | 11,253 | 50.64 |
| Disentis/Mustér | 2,009 | 90.99 |
| Medel (Lucmagn) | 344 | 136.22 |
| Sumvitg | 1,104 | 101.88 |
| Tujetsch | 1,183 | 133.91 |
| Trun | 1,161 | 51.9 |
| Obersaxen Mundaun | 1,164 | 70.36 |

== Linguistic demography ==
Romansh is the predominant language in the region, mostly the Sursilvan dialect. There is a large German-speaking minority in Surselva, notably the Walser settlements of Obersaxen and Vals. However, the percentage of Romansh-speakers is in decline. Traditional Romansh-speaking cities such as Ilanz are losing ground to German.

Languages of Surselva Region, GR
| Languages | Census 2000 | |
| Languages | Number | Percent |
|---|---|---|
| German | 7,335 | 34.5% |
| Romansh | 12,606 | 59.4% |
| Italian | 289 | 1.4% |
| TOTAL | 21,231 | 100% |

== History ==
Surselva District (Romansh: District da la Surselva) was an administrative district in the canton of the Grisons, Switzerland, from 2000 until 2016. It had an area of 1,373.39 km^{2} (530.27 sq mi) and a population of 21,325 in 2015.

It was formed in 2000 by a merger of the former Vorderrhein and Glenner districts. During its existence there were several changes in its composition:

- On 1 January 2012 the municipality of Schlans merged into the municipality of Trun.
- The municipalities of Cumbel, Degen, Lumbrein, Morissen, Suraua, Vignogn, Vella, and Vrin merged on 1 January 2013 into the new municipality of Lumnezia.
- On 1 January 2014 the former municipalities of Castrisch, Ilanz, Ladir, Luven, Pitasch, Riein, Ruschein, Schnaus, Sevgein, Duvin, Pigniu, Rueun and Siat merged into the new municipality of Ilanz/Glion.
- On 1 January 2015 the former municipality of St. Martin merged into the municipality of Vals.

It consisted of five Kreise (sub-districts) and forty-three municipalities. It was replaced with the Surselva Region (the same area but with a simpler political structure) on 1 January 2017 as part of a reorganization of the canton.
