= Vella, Switzerland =

Vella
- Former municipality
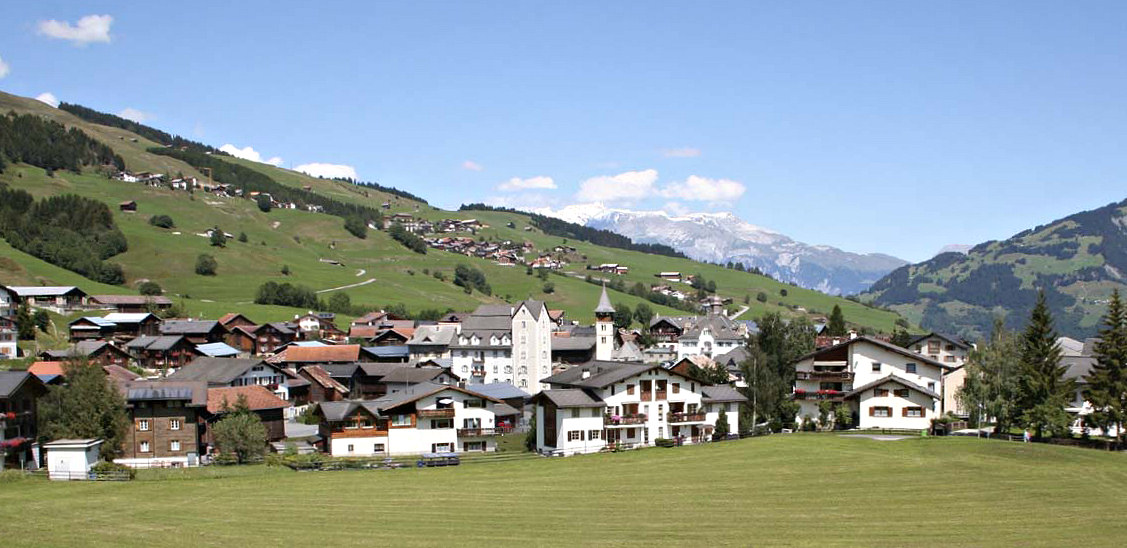

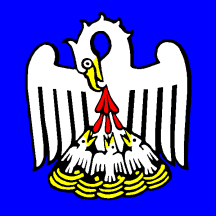
- Flag Coat of arms
- Location of Vella
- Location within Switzerland Location within Canton of Graubünden
- Coordinates: 46°43′N 9°10′E
- Country: Switzerland
- Canton: Graubünden
- District: Surselva

Government
  - Mayor: Daniel Blumenthal

Area
  - Total: 7.38 km^{2} (2.85 sq mi)
- Elevation: 1,244 m (4,081 ft)

Population (Dec 2011)
  - Total: 438
  - Density: 59.3/km^{2} (154/sq mi)
- Time zone: UTC+01:00 (CET)
  - Summer (DST): UTC+02:00 (CEST)
- Postal code: 7144
- SFOS number: 3605
- ISO 3166 code: CH-GR
- Surrounded by: Cumbel, Degen, Morissen, Obersaxen, Suraua, Surcuolm
- Website: www.vallumnezia.ch

Vella is a village and a former municipality in the district of Surselva in the canton of Graubünden in Switzerland. The municipalities of Cumbel, Degen, Lumbrein, Morissen, Suraua, Vignogn, Vella, and Vrin merged on 1 January 2013 into the new municipality of Lumnezia.

== History ==
While there is some evidence of a late Bronze Age settlement and coins from the 3rd and 4th Centuries have been found, Vella is first mentioned about 840 as ad sanctum Vincentium [...] in valle Leguntia. In 1290-98 it was mentioned as ad Ville, aput Villam. The village church was the center of a parish that covered the entire valley. However, about 1300 Vals separated from the parish due to the desire of Walser German speaking Walser immigrants to have their own religious leadership. Over the following centuries, most of the other villages in the valley also separated from the Vella parish (the most recent being Peiden in 1910). Due to the village's function as a religious center and the power of a local patrician family, de Mont, Vella grew to be the most powerful village in the valley. Since 1887, it has been home to the sub-district secondary school.

== Coat of arms ==
The description of the municipal coat of arms is Azure a Pelican in Piety Argent. The pelican, which according to legend feeds its young with its own blood, is a symbol for the death of Jesus. By extension, it can also represent the entire church. In this case, it stands for the parish church for the Lugnez valley, which is in Degen.

== Geography ==
Vella had an area, as of 2006, of 7.4 km^{2} (2.9 sq mi). Of this area, 69.5% is used for agricultural purposes, while 18.6% is forested. Of the rest of the land, 4.6% is settled (buildings or roads) and the remainder (7.3%) is non-productive (rivers, glaciers or mountains).

The former municipality is located in the Lugnez sub-district of the Surselva district. It is located at 1,244 m (4,081 ft) ft altitude on a plateau in the centre of the Lumnezia, a high alpine valley.

The municipality consists of the village Villa and the church St. Vincent in Pleif built on a ridge overlooking the Glenner/Glogn gorge, a tributary to the Vorderrhein. The highest elevation is Mount Stein at 2,172 meters (7,126 ft) altitude.

Until 1987 Vella was known as Villa (GR).

== Demographics ==
Vella had a population (as of 2011) of 438. As of 2008, 2.9% of the population was made up of foreign nationals. Over the last 10 years the population has decreased at a rate of -3.4%. Most of the population (as of 2000) speaks Romansh (83.9%), with German being second most common (13.6%) and Serbo-Croatian being third ( 1.1%).

As of 2000, the gender distribution of the population was 50.8% male and 49.2% female. The age distribution, as of 2000, in Vella is; 63 children or 14.3% of the population are between 0 and 9 years old and 54 teenagers or 12.2% are between 10 and 19. Of the adult population, 44 people or 10.0% of the population are between 20 and 29 years old. 61 people or 13.8% are between 30 and 39, 82 people or 18.6% are between 40 and 49, and 44 people or 10.0% are between 50 and 59. The senior population distribution is 37 people or 8.4% of the population are between 60 and 69 years old, 34 people or 7.7% are between 70 and 79, there are 21 people or 4.8% who are between 80 and 89, and there is 1 person who is between 90 and 99.

In the 2007 federal election the most popular party was the CVP which received 54.2% of the vote. The next three most popular parties were the SVP (23.8%), the FDP (14.2%) and the SP (7.8%).

In Vella about 70.7% of the population (between age 25-64) have completed either non-mandatory upper secondary education or additional higher education (either university or a Fachhochschule).

Vella has an unemployment rate of 0.86%. As of 2005, there were 17 people employed in the primary economic sector and about 7 businesses involved in this sector. 66 people are employed in the secondary sector and there are 10 businesses in this sector. 101 people are employed in the tertiary sector, with 27 businesses in this sector.

The historical population is given in the following table:

year	population
1808	199
1835	301
1850	229
1900	272
1950	418
1990	398
2000	441

== Weather ==
Vella has an average of 116 days of rain or snow per year and on average receives 1,004 mm (39.5 in) of precipitation. The wettest month is August during which time Vella receives an average of 115 mm (4.5 in) of rain or snow. During this month there is precipitation for an average of 11.5 days. The month with the most days of precipitation is May, with an average of 11.7, but with only 100 mm (3.9 in) of rain or snow. The driest month of the year is February with an average of 55 mm (2.2 in) of precipitation over 11.5 days.

== Heritage sites of national significance ==
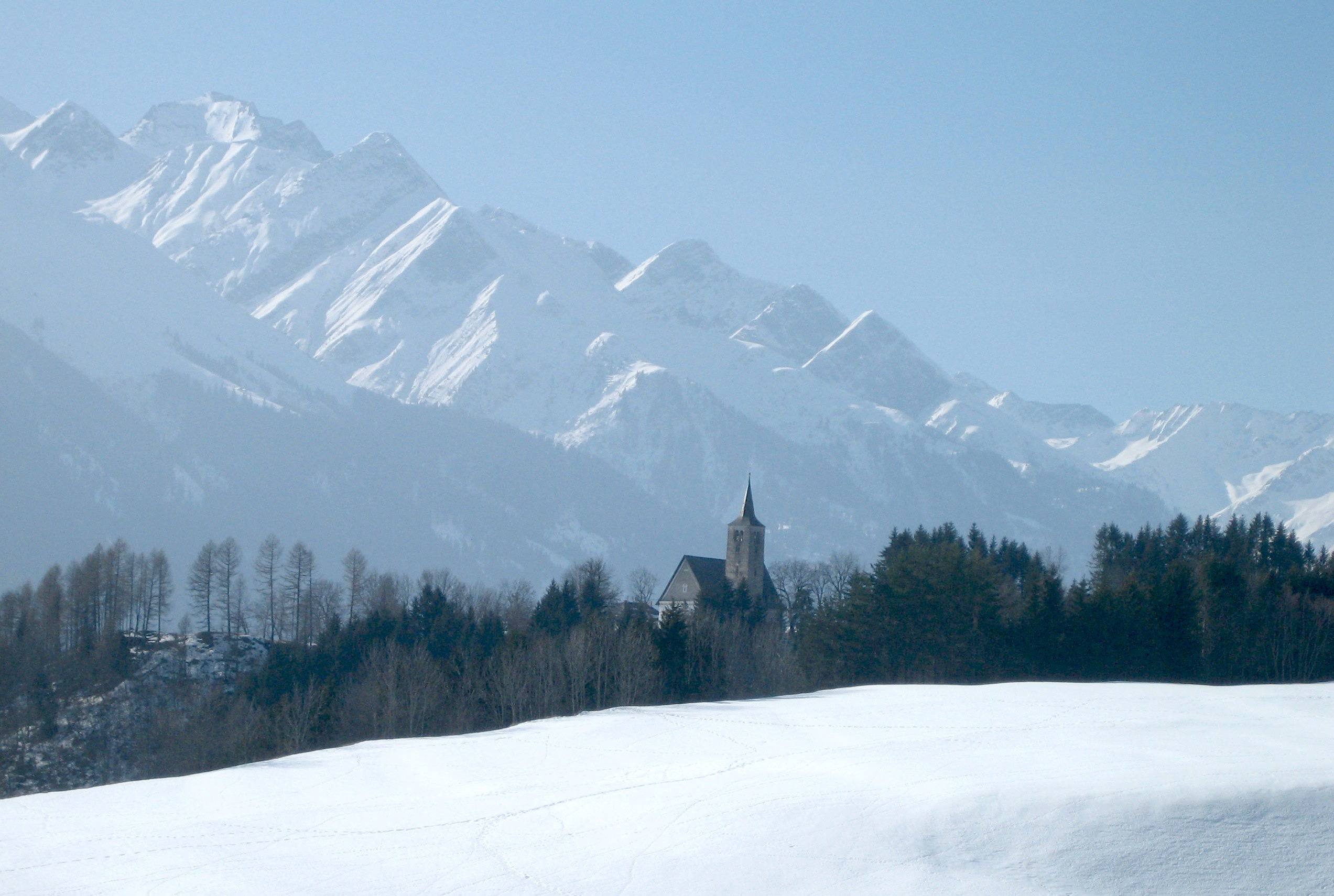
Church of St. Vincent

The Church of S. Vincenz/St. Vincent is listed as a Swiss heritage site of national significance.

The church is first mentioned about 843, when it was given Imperial support. It later came under the patronage of the Welfs and in the mid 10th century came under the authority of the cathedral of Constance. By the 14th Century it was owned by the Freiherr of Belmont, but in 1371 was inherited by the family of Sax-Misox. Then, in 1483 it came under the authority of the Bishop of Chur. The Gothic/Romanesque church was rebuilt in 1661-62.
