= Rappenstein Castle =

Rappenstein
- Untervaz
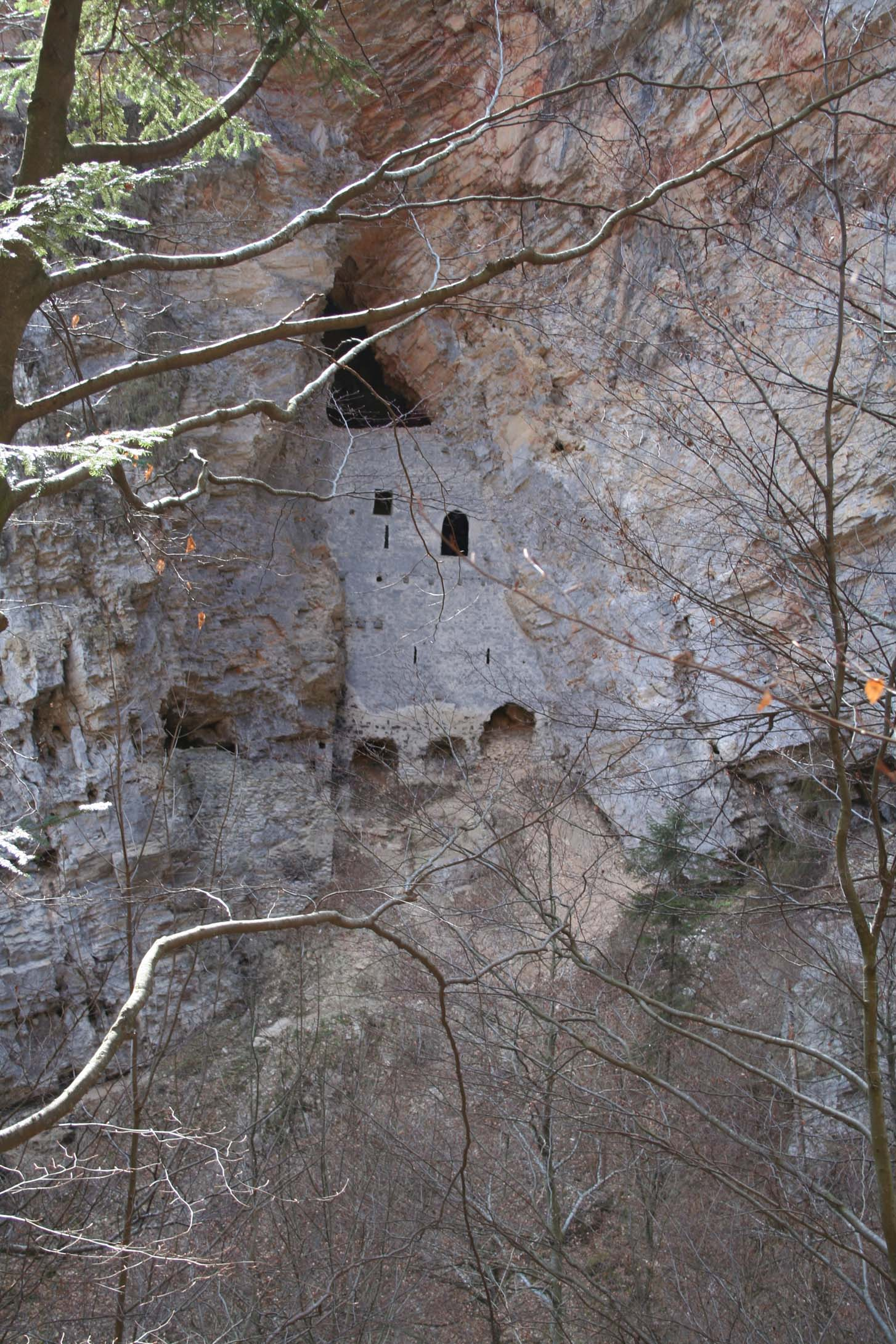
- Ruins of Rappenstein

Site information
- Type: Cave castle
- Code: CH-GR
- Condition: ruin

Location
- Coordinates: 46°55′30″N 9°31′11″E
- Height: 1,058 m above the sea

Site history
- Built: around 1250
- Materials: rubble stone

Rappenstein Castle is a ruined castle in the municipality of Untervaz of the Canton of Graubünden in Switzerland.

== History ==
Almost nothing is known about the history of this castle, including its original name. Based on its construction, it was built around the middle of the 13th century. A wooden beam in the castle has been dated to 1255. During the 13th century the area around the castle belonged to the knightly family Tumb von Neuburg from Vorarlberg. Since their main castle, nearby Neuburg Castle, was first built around 1300, before then the Tumb von Neuburg family may have lived at Rappenstein or at another demolished castle on Neuburg. One of the walls of the castle shows evidence of a second construction phase which reinforced the wall. This may indicate that the castle was inhabited for a while or that it was used as a fallback fortification in case of war.

In 1450 the von Mötteli or von Rappenstein family from around St. Gallen acquired Neuburg Castle and its surroundings including the castle. They had taken the Rappenstein name after their castle near St. Gallen. When they moved to Graubünden, that name was applied to this castle as well. By the late 15th century, Rappenstein had been abandoned. In 1496, when the von Rappensteins sold Neuburg to the Bishop of Chur, Rappenstein Castle was not mentioned but its land was included in the sale.

== Castle site ==
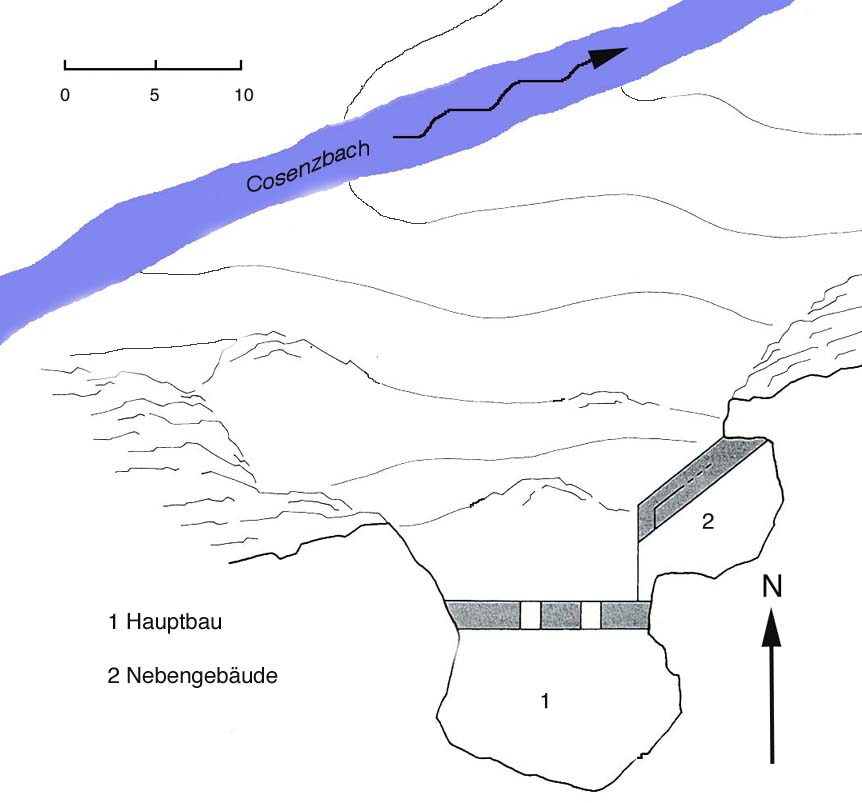
Plan of Rappenstein Castle

The castle is located in the narrow Cosenz Gorge near Untervaz, and during rainstorms can be completely inaccessible. It consists of two walls built across natural caves which form a main building and the Nebengebäude or neighboring building. The main building can be entered through a narrow opening in the 12 meters (39 ft) high and 1.4 m (4.6 ft) thick wall. The exterior walls still show the Pietra Rasa construction, where the mortar that holds the rough stones together is also used as a plaster to them. Beyond the wall, the cave is about 15 m (49 ft) deep and two stories high. The ends of wooden beams that once supported the upper level can still be seen. They appear to have been intentionally cut, probably when the castle was abandoned.

== Gallery ==
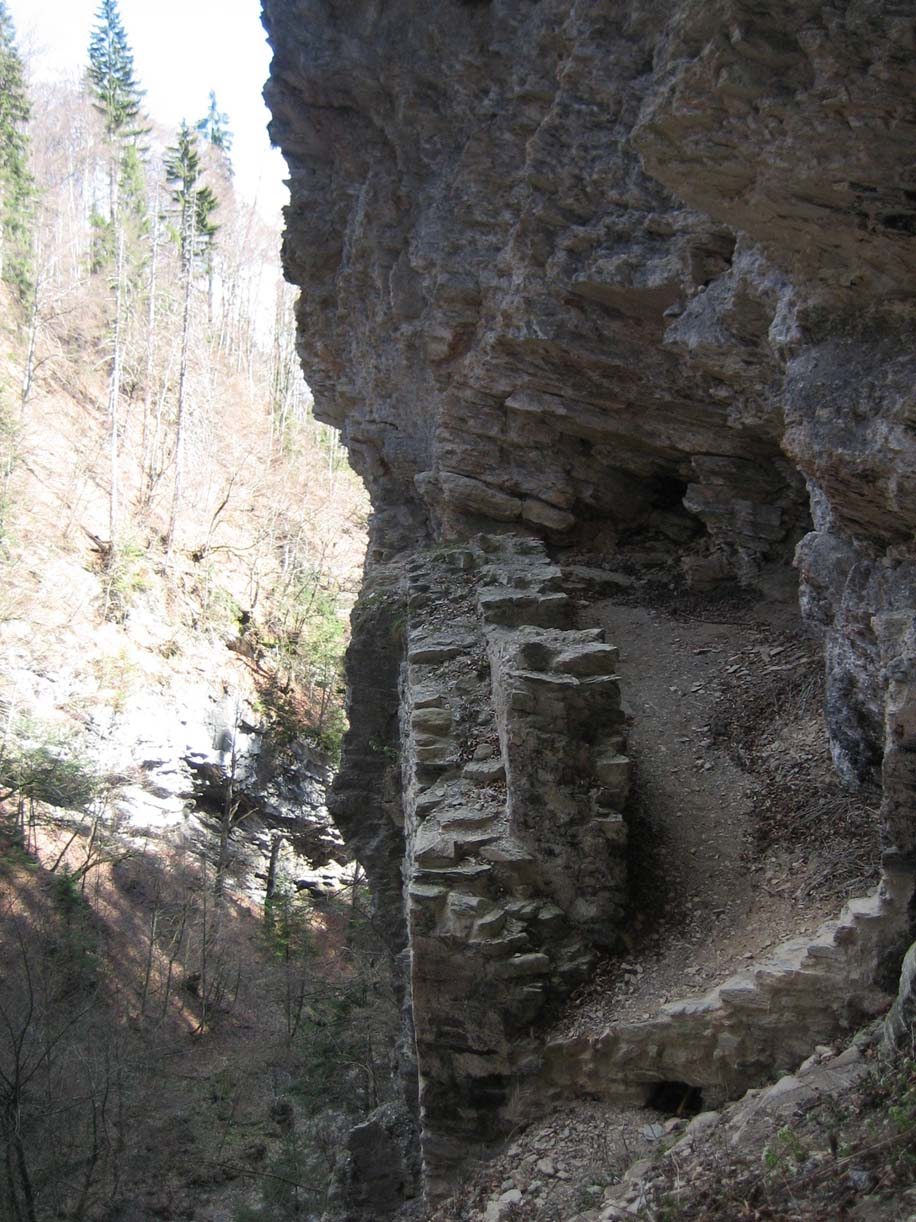
Foundation of the Nebengebäude

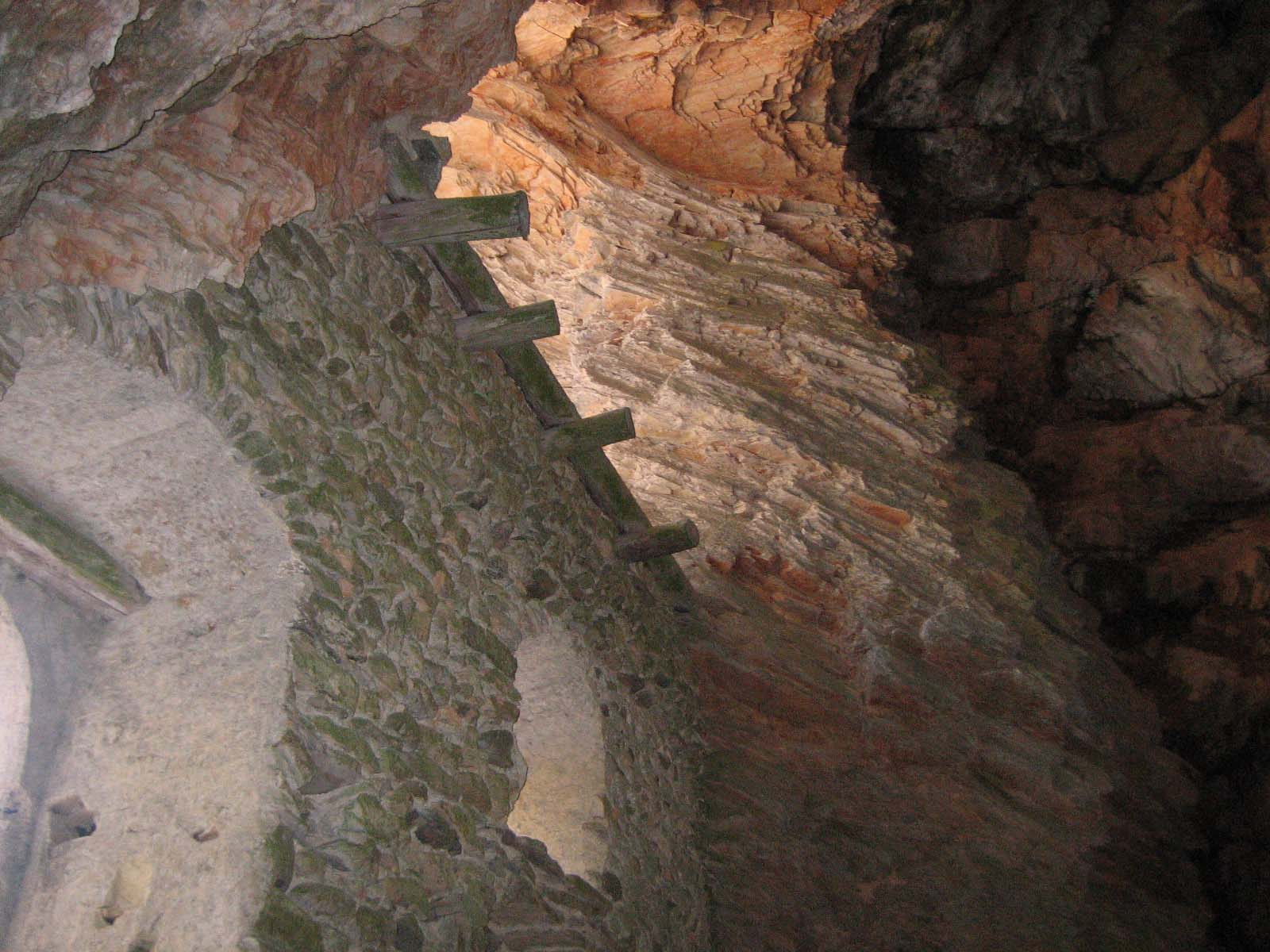
Interior with wooden beams

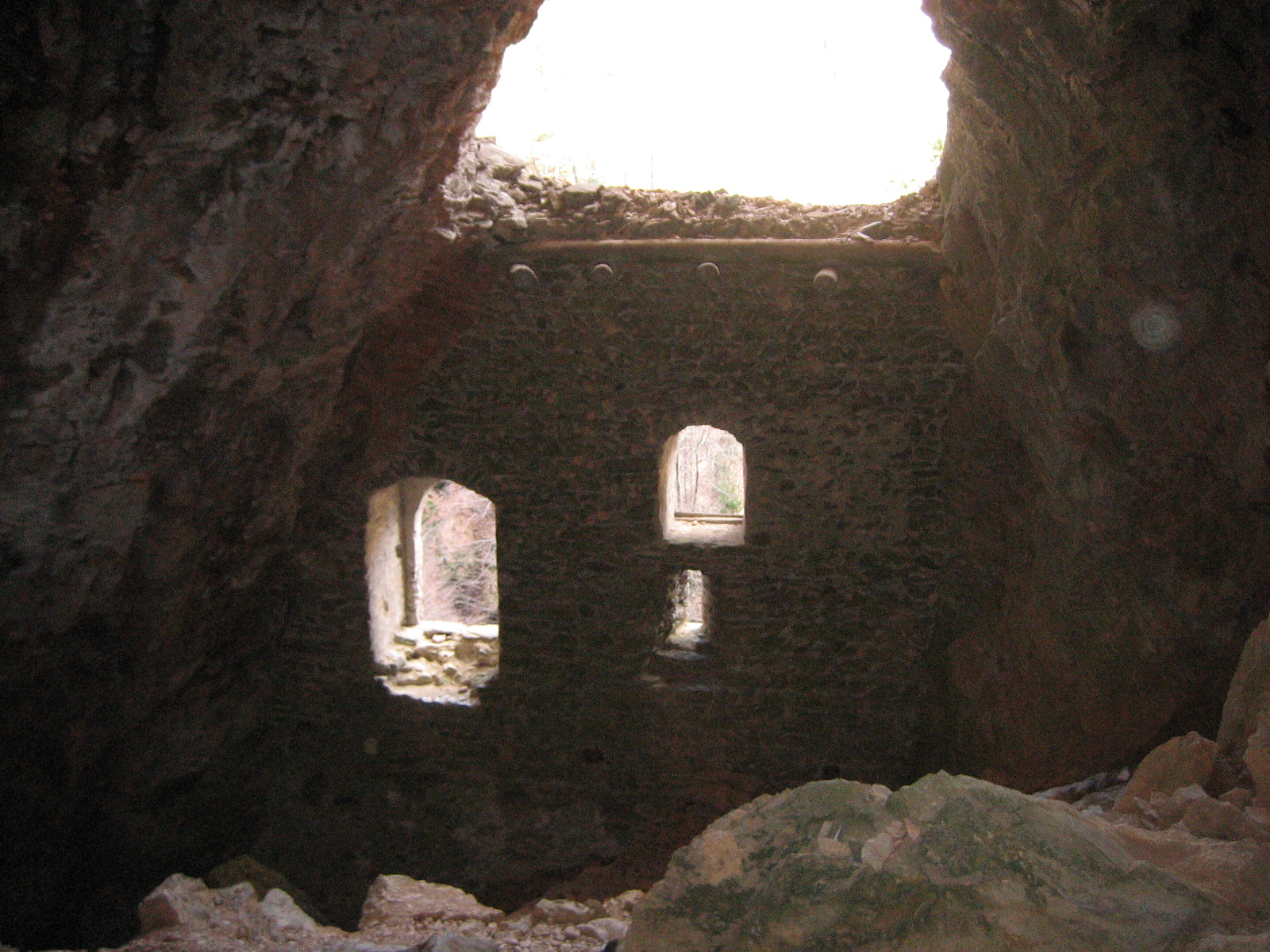
Interior, on the left side of the entrance

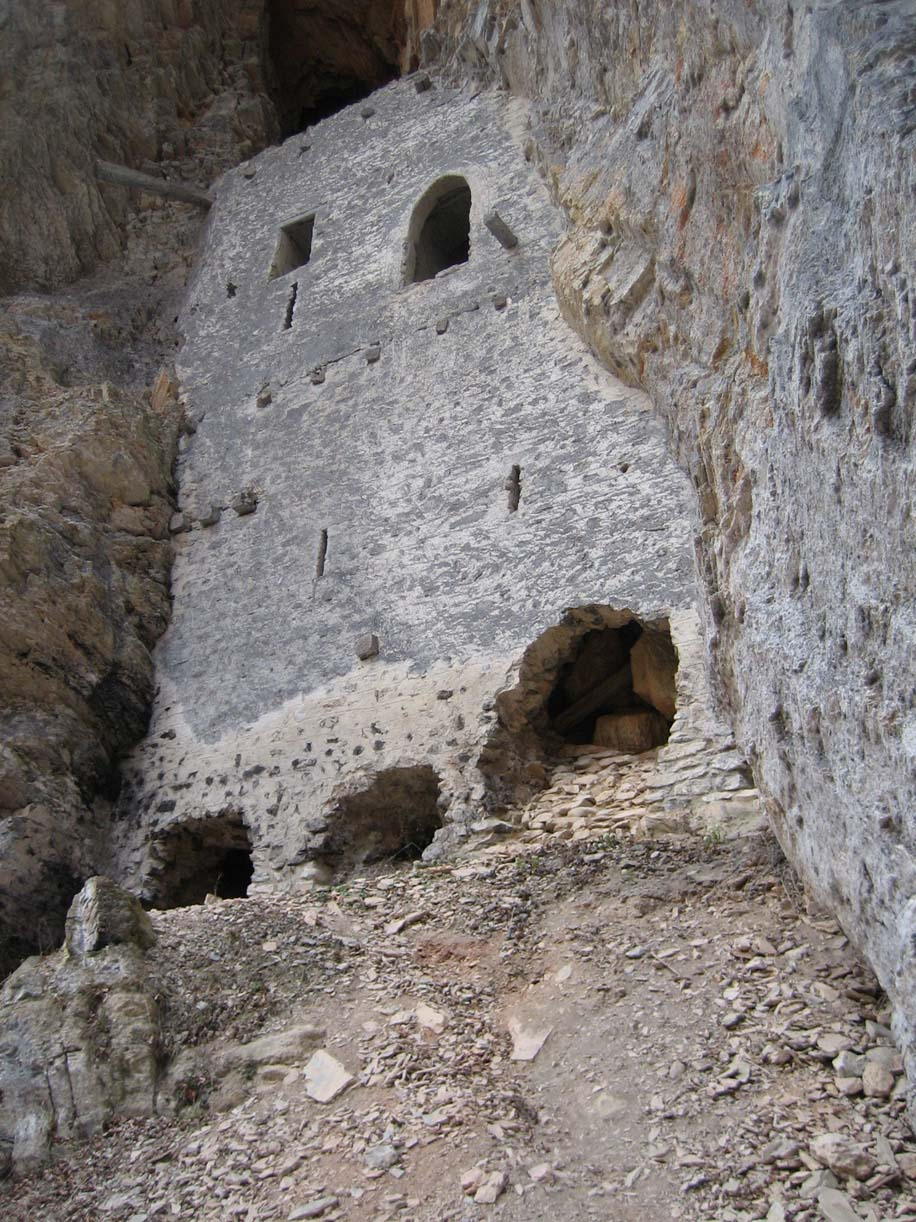
Main wall with entrance

== See also ==
- List of castles in Switzerland
