= Cave castle =

Castle built into a natural cave

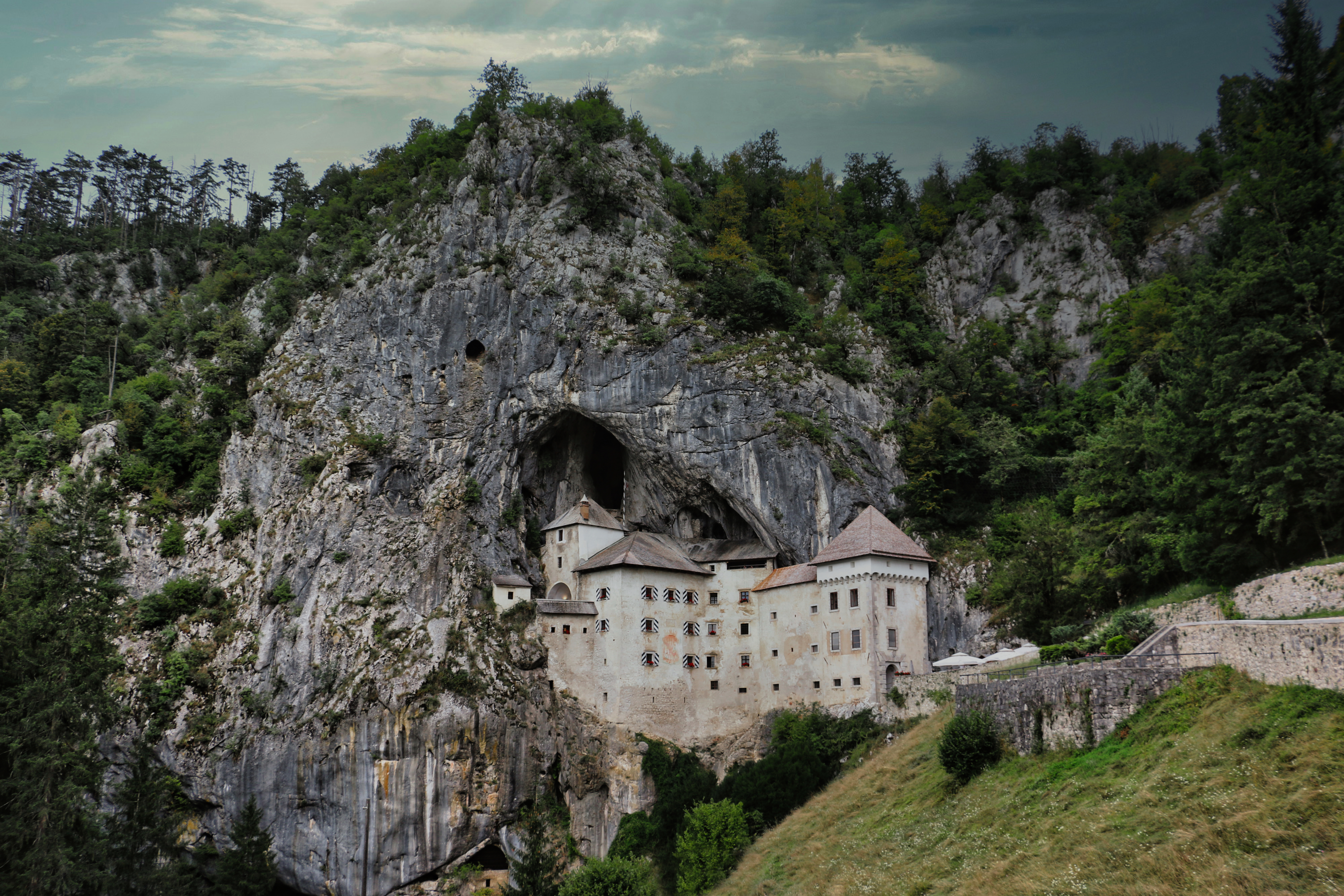
Predjama grotto castle near Postojna (Adelsberg), Slovenia

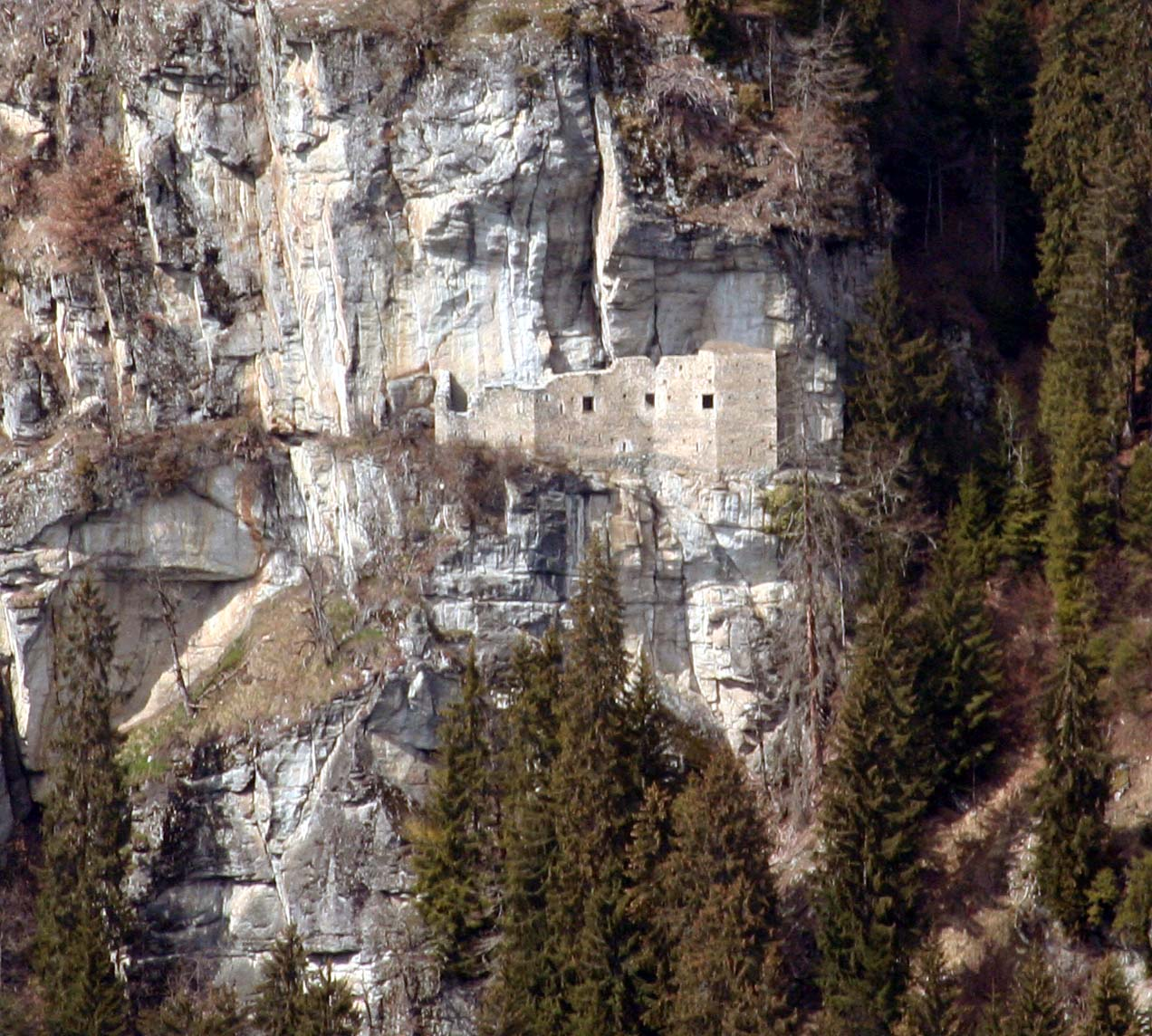
Kropfenstein Castle near Waltensburg/Vuorz, Graubünden, Switzerland

A cave castle (German: Höhlenburg) or grotto castle (German: Grottenburg) is a residential or refuge castle that has been built into a natural cave. It falls within the category of hill castles. Unlike other types (such as water castles), such castles can only be assaulted from the front, or by drilling through the rock above; the gateway is usually located in the middle of a rock face, which makes it much more difficult to penetrate. Archaeological discoveries have revealed that caves were used as places of refuge as early as the Stone Age. The first medieval cave castles emerged in the 11th and 12th centuries. In the 14th and 15th centuries this type became more widespread, especially in certain parts of France and Switzerland.

== Location and layout ==
The actual cave castle was generally built at the foot of a high rock face and at the level of one or more steep scree slopes; they are however quite rare in mountainous regions, for example in North Tyrol only four sites are known to date: Altfinstermünz in the Upper Inn valley, Loch near Unter-Pinswang, Lueg am Brenner and one in the Herrenhauswand near Schwendt/Kössen. In several regions in Switzerland and France, soft rock material provides a good basis for the construction of cave and grotto castles. There are considerably more of this type in Graubünden, Ticino, Valais or the Dordogne than, for example, in Bavaria or the Tyrol. The domestic buildings and stables were generally sited in the valley bottom beneath, because the cave was often only accessible over steep and narrow paths; excavations have revealed the relatively high standard of living in several cave castles, other sites may only have been inhabited part of the time and guarded mountain passes or important road links. For similar reasons, most of them had no bergfried or other towers, one exception is Loch Castle near Eichhofen in Bavaria, that has an imposing round one at the front.

In many cases, the cave or grotto was simply sealed by a frontal wall and divided internally by stone or wooden partitions, however several were later turned into representative seats and expanded accordingly: for example Stein Castle and Predjama Castle. From an engineering perspective the cave castle is closely related to the rock castle; here too natural or artificially widened rock openings were incorporated into the structure. In Central Europe, many such rock castles have been preserved in the sandstone regions of south and central Germany or Bohemia, including those in the Elbe Sandstone Mountains, the Palatinate Forest and in the Haßberge Hills.

== Cave castles and grotto castles ==
In the technical literature a distinction is made between cave and grotto castles. In the case of the latter an entire castle was built in front of, or within, a natural grotto (e.g. Predjama Castle), whilst in the case of a cave castle, the cave was only closed off with a front wall and divided internally by wooden or stone partitions, although in popular usage both terms are used more or less interchangeably.

== Other examples ==
- Wolkenstein Castle in Gröden, South Tyrol, Italy
- Stein Castle in Stein an der Traun, Bavaria, Germany
- Predjama Castle, Slovenia
- Puxerloch (cave castles Luegg and Schallaun) near Frojach in the Styria, Austria
- Kronmetz Castle, Italy
- Luegstein Castle near Oberaudorf, Bavaria, Germany
- Wichenstein Castle near Oberriet, St Gallen, Switzerland
- Qal'at Ibn Maan, 17th-century, Galilee, Israel

Castles from the Crusader states in the Middle East

- Cave de Sueth (Cave de Suète) or Habis Jaldak, Yarmouk Valley, Jordan
- Magharat Fakhr ad-Din, inland of Sidon, Lebanon
- Fortress of Niha, or Cave de Tyron / Tirun an-Niha, stood at the centre of the Lordship of Sidon, Lebanon
- Jebel Quruntul (Docus, castellum Abrahami), Templar cave castle on the mountain overlooking Jericho, West Bank, Palestine
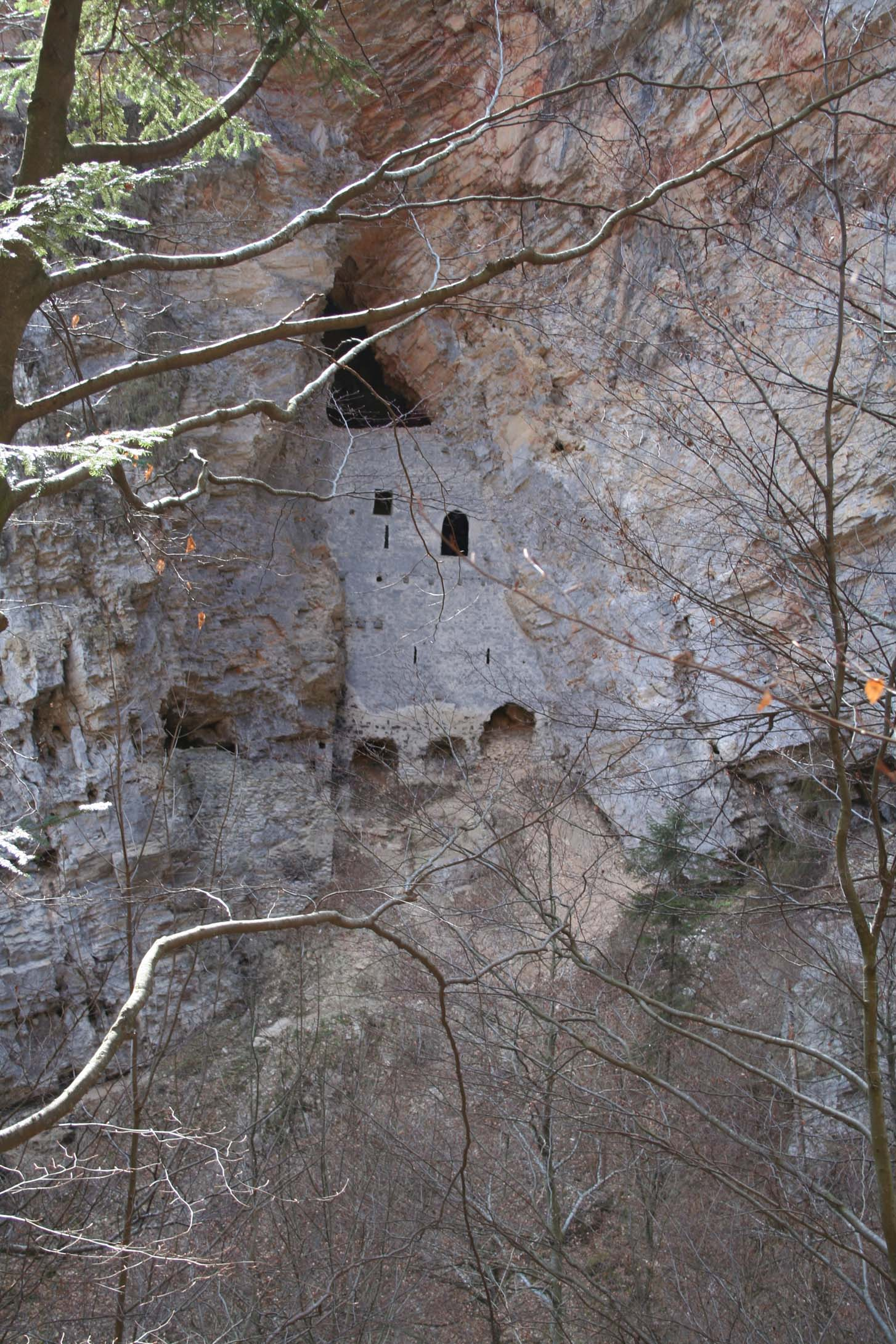
Rappenstein Castle near Untervaz, Graubünden, Switzerland

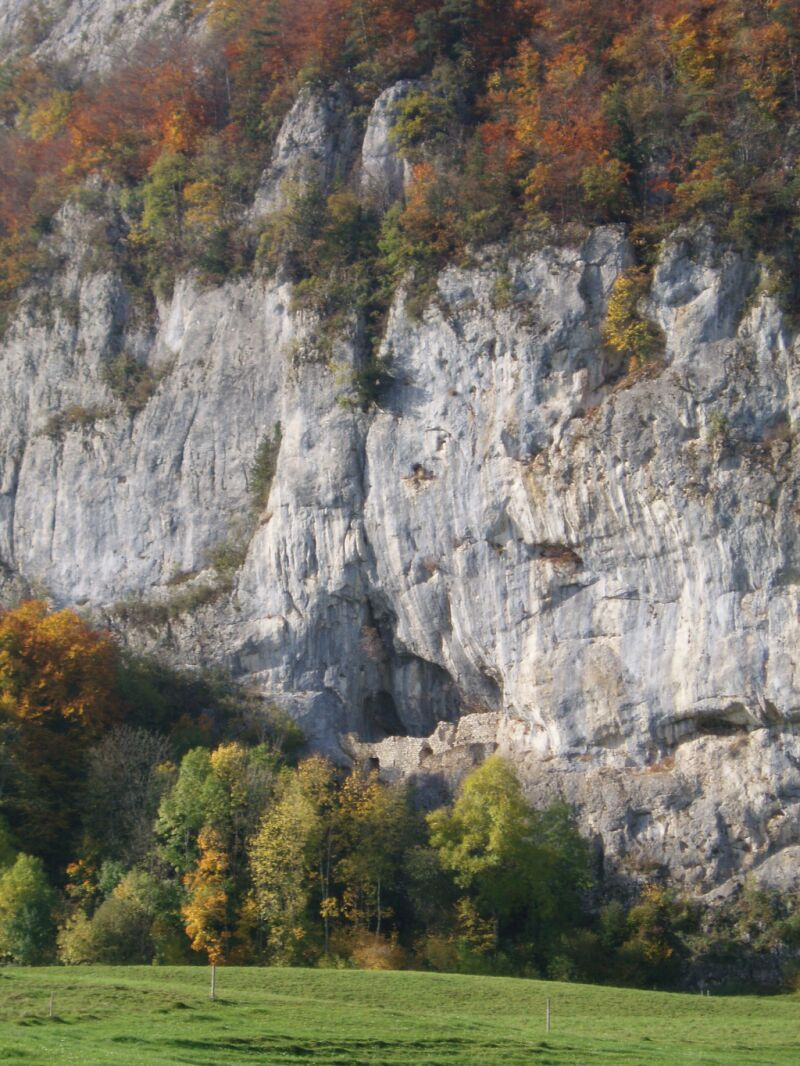
Balm Castle near Balm, Solothurn, Switzerland

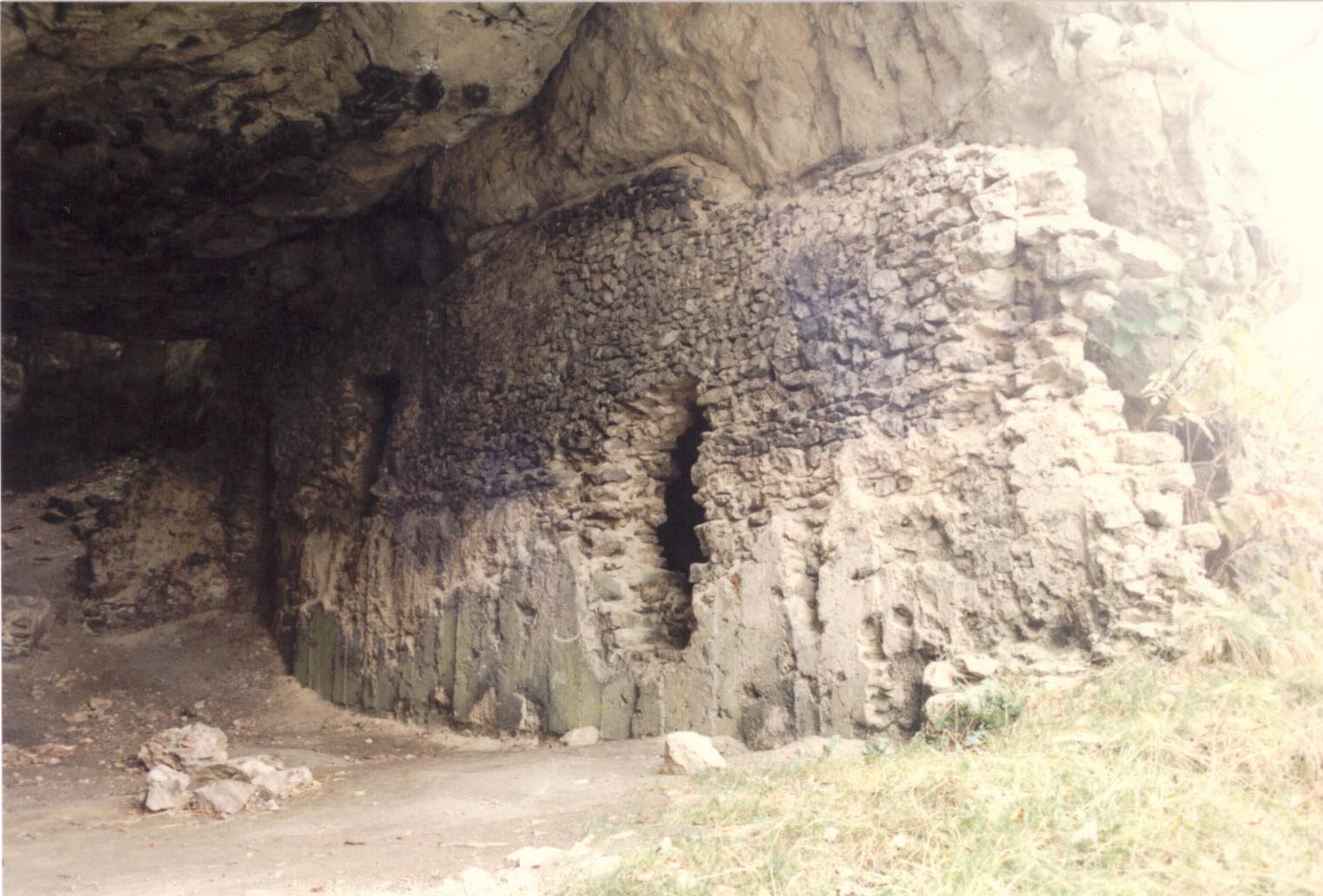
Loch Castle near Eichhofen, Bavaria

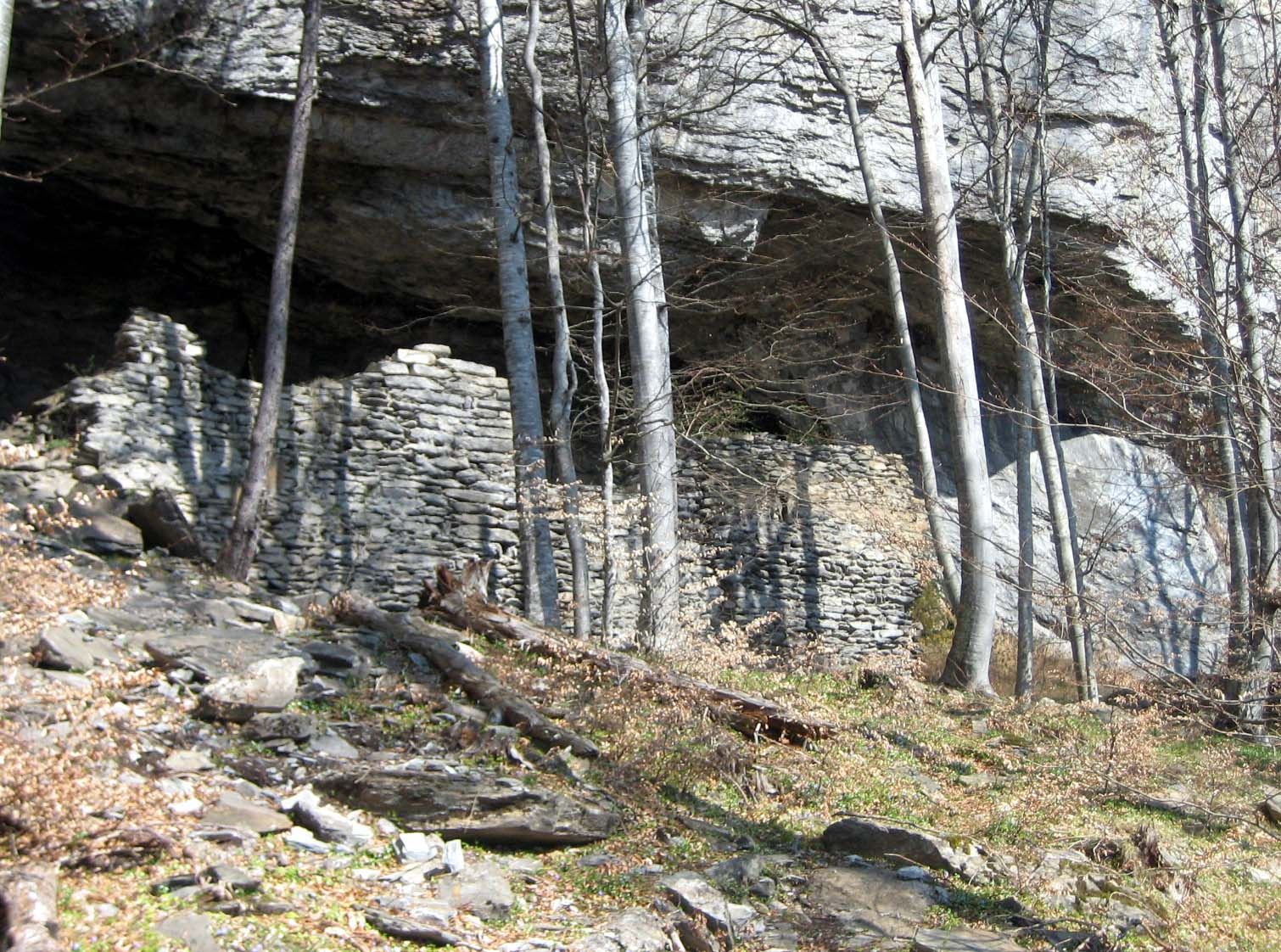
Grottenstein Castle near Haldenstein, Graubünden, Switzerland

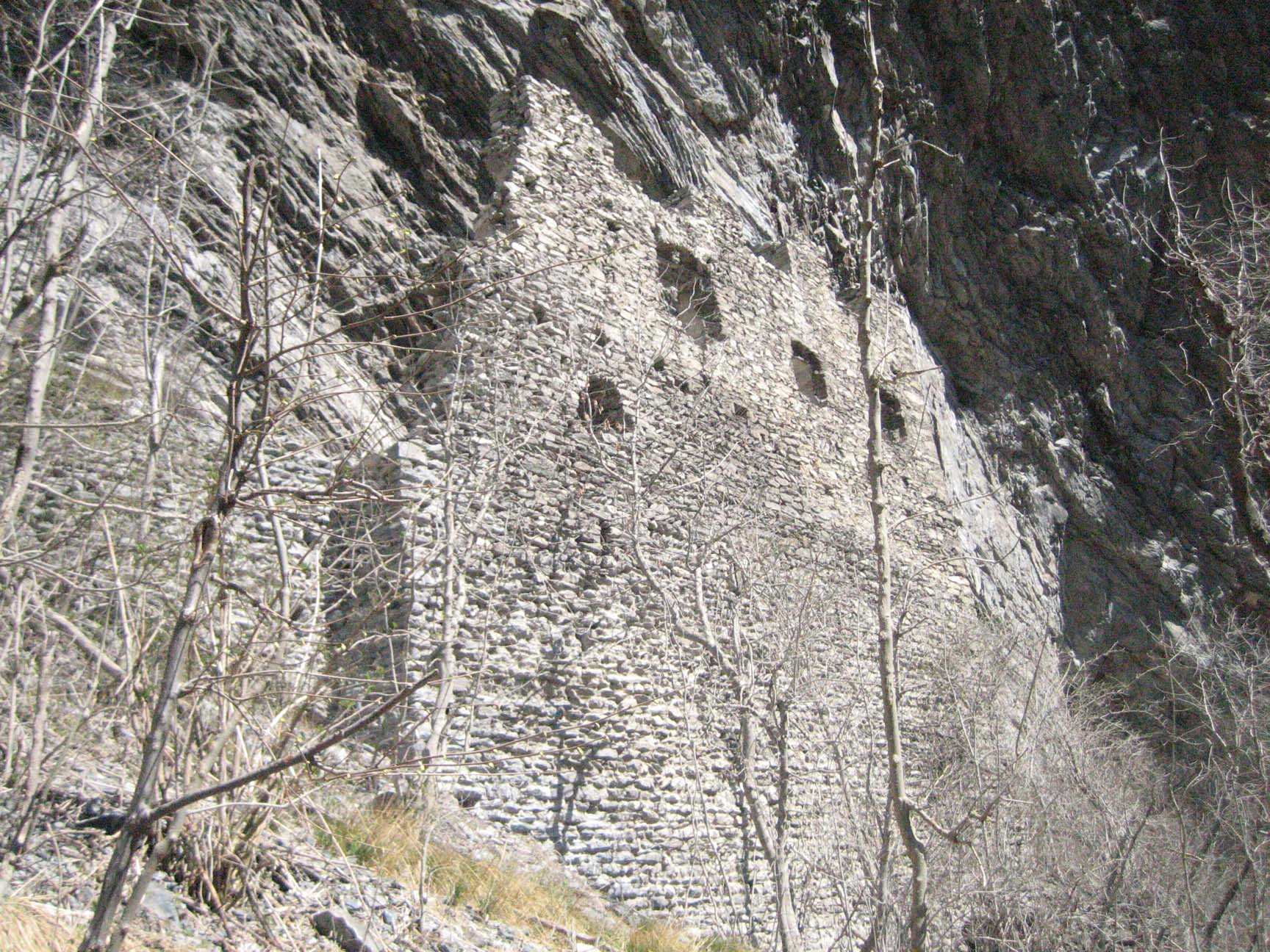
Fracstein Castle near Seewis, Graubünden, Switzerland

== Literature ==
- Otto Piper: Burgenkunde. Nachdruck der Ausgabe von 1912. Weltbild, Augsburg 1994, ISBN 3-89350-554-7, p. 554–559.
- Maxi Zier: Mittelalterliche Höhlenburgen. In: Basler Zeitschrift für Geschichte und Altertumskunde. No. 65, 1965, ISSN 0067-4540, p. 53–62.

== See also ==
- Castle
- Rock castle
