= Neuburg Castle =

- Neuburg Castle (Bavaria)
- Neuburg Castle (Switzerland)
