= Grottenstein Castle =

Historical building

- Krottenstein
- Haldenstein
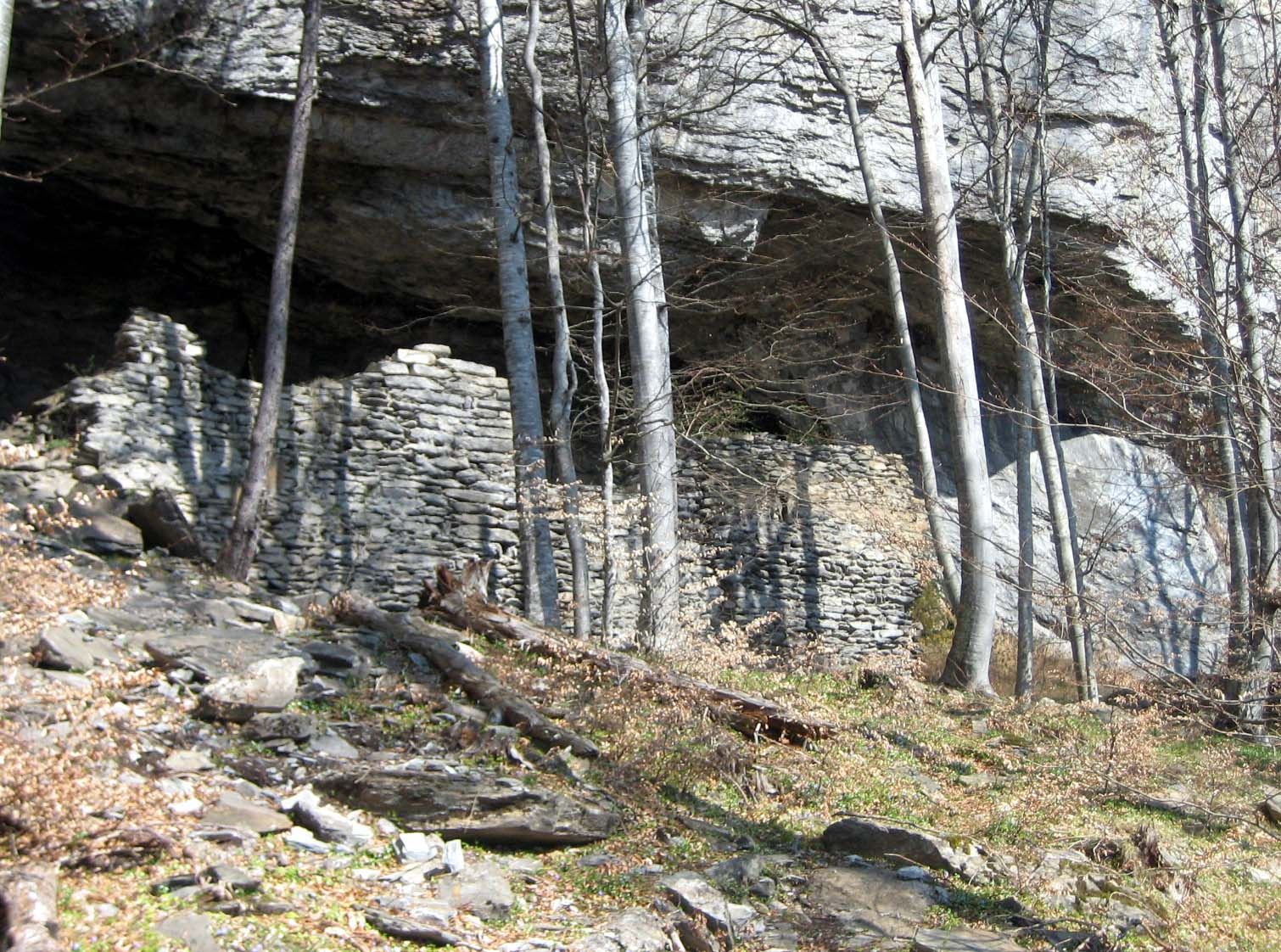
- Remains of the wall

Site information
- Type: Cave castle
- Code: CH-GR
- Condition: ruin

Location
- Coordinates: 46°53′2″N 09°31′22″E
- Height: 840 m

Site history
- Built: about 1180
- Materials: rubble stone

Grottenstein Castle is a ruined castle in the municipality of Haldenstein of the Canton of Graubünden in Switzerland.

== History ==
The castle is not mentioned in any records until 1672 when it was a ruin. Its location, only a few hundred meters from both Lichtenstein Castle and Haldenstein Castle indicates that it was probably built for the Lords of Lichtenstein or their relatives the Lords of Haldenstein. It may have been built as an emergency refuge for those families. The last member of the Lichtenstein family, Ulrich died in 1275 and passed his lands to Haldenstein family. A relative Rudolph, was a canon in Chur until 1282, but did not inherit. The male line of the Haldenstein family ended when Ulrich IV died at the Battle of Näfels in 1388. His lands were inherited by a number of relatives, but by 1424 the Herrschaft of Haldenstein was owned by Ursula von Hohenems and her husband Peter von Grifensee.

The castle was first mentioned in 1672 as Crottenstein (from German: Kröten or toad). In 1742 Nicolin Sererhard mentioned the castle as Krottenstein. From there, it eventually became Grottenstein.

== Castle site ==
The castle is located south of Haldenstein on the slopes of Mount Calanda. It was built by constructing a wall across the entrance to a small cavern. Today about 22 meters (72 ft) of the 1.7 m (5.6 ft) thick wall remains. Near the center of the wall, part of the main entrance still remains.

== Gallery ==
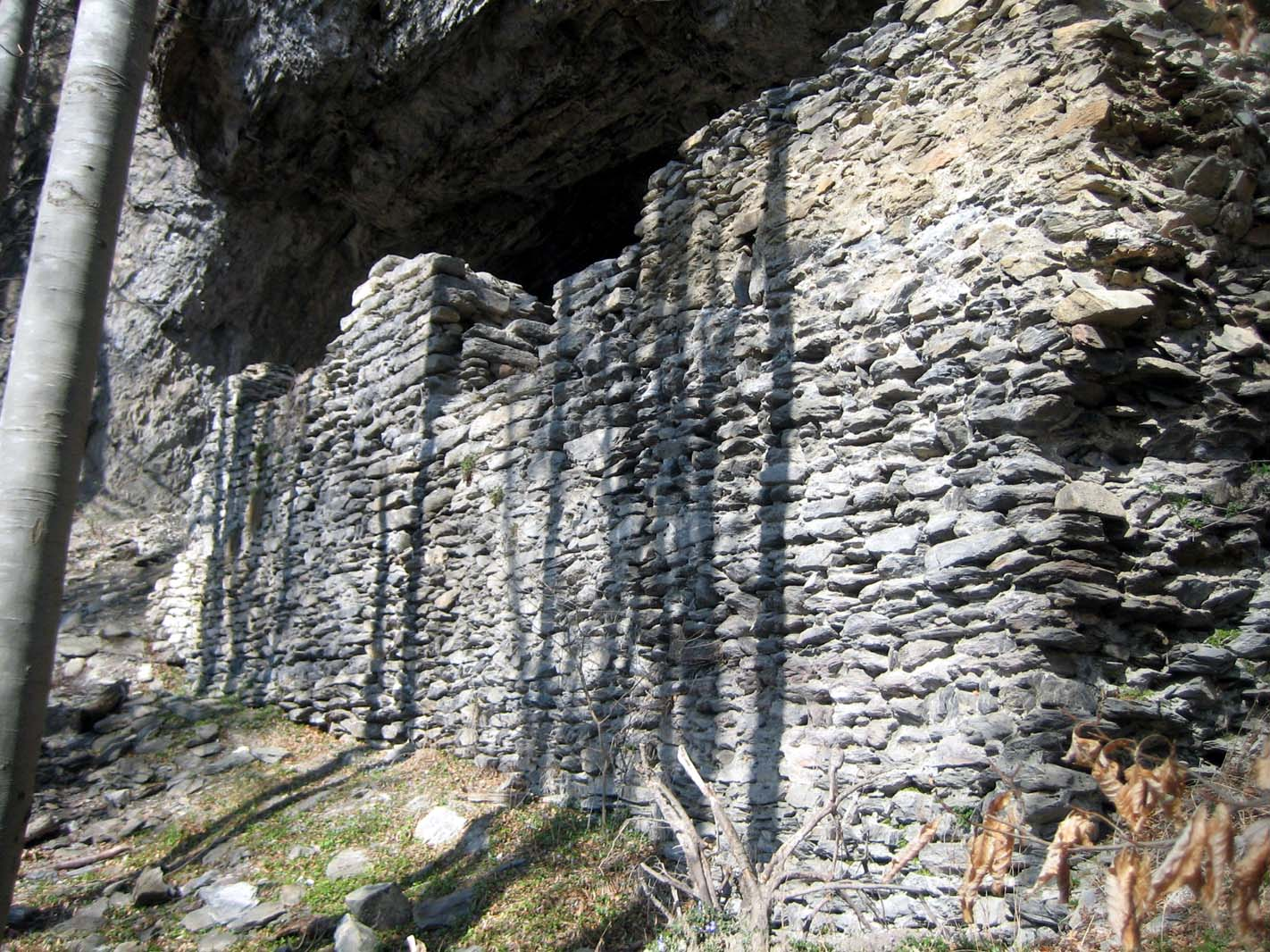
A view of the wall

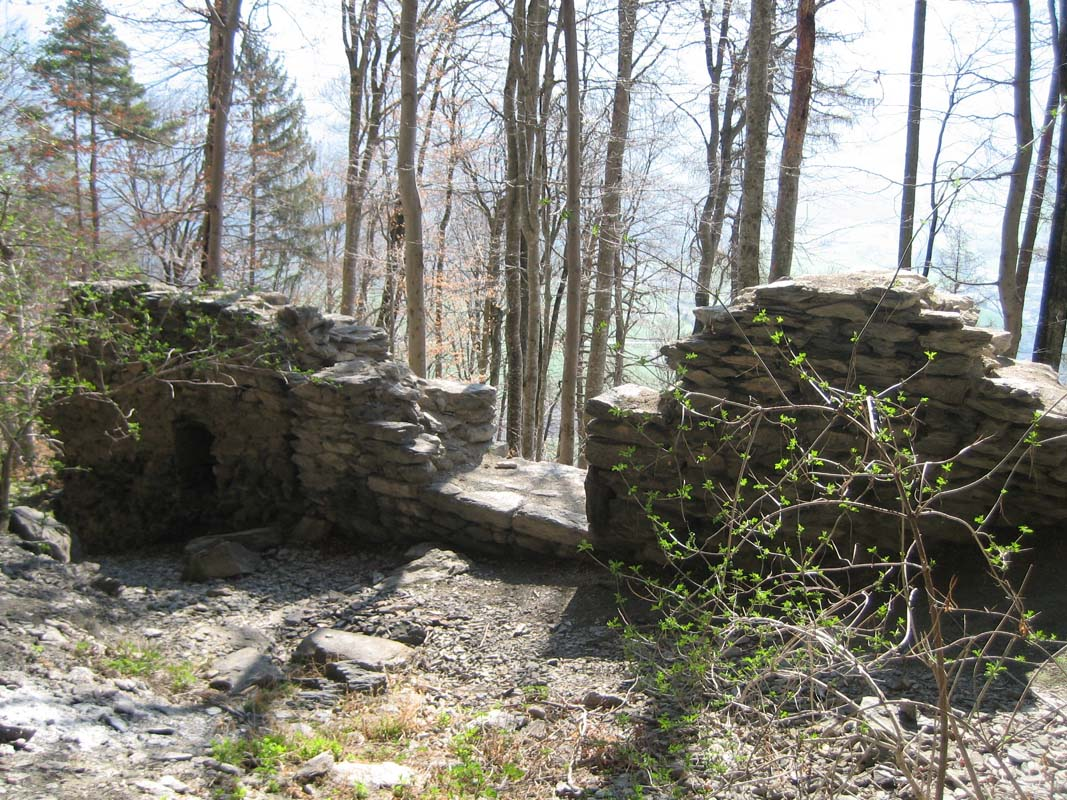
Interior, ruins of the main doorway

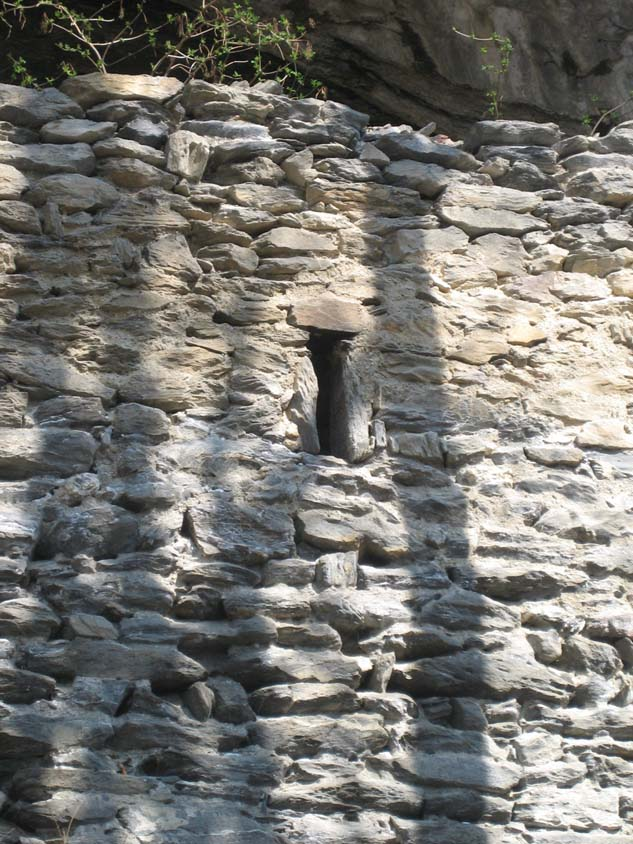
Wall with a small window

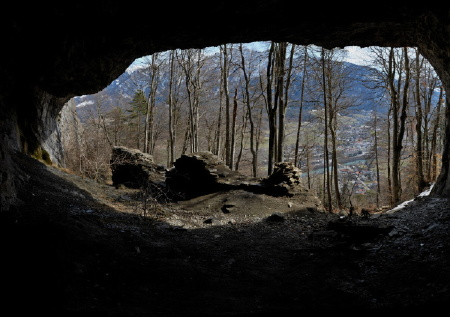
View from inside the castle

== See also ==
- List of castles in Switzerland
