= Nittendorf =

- Municipality
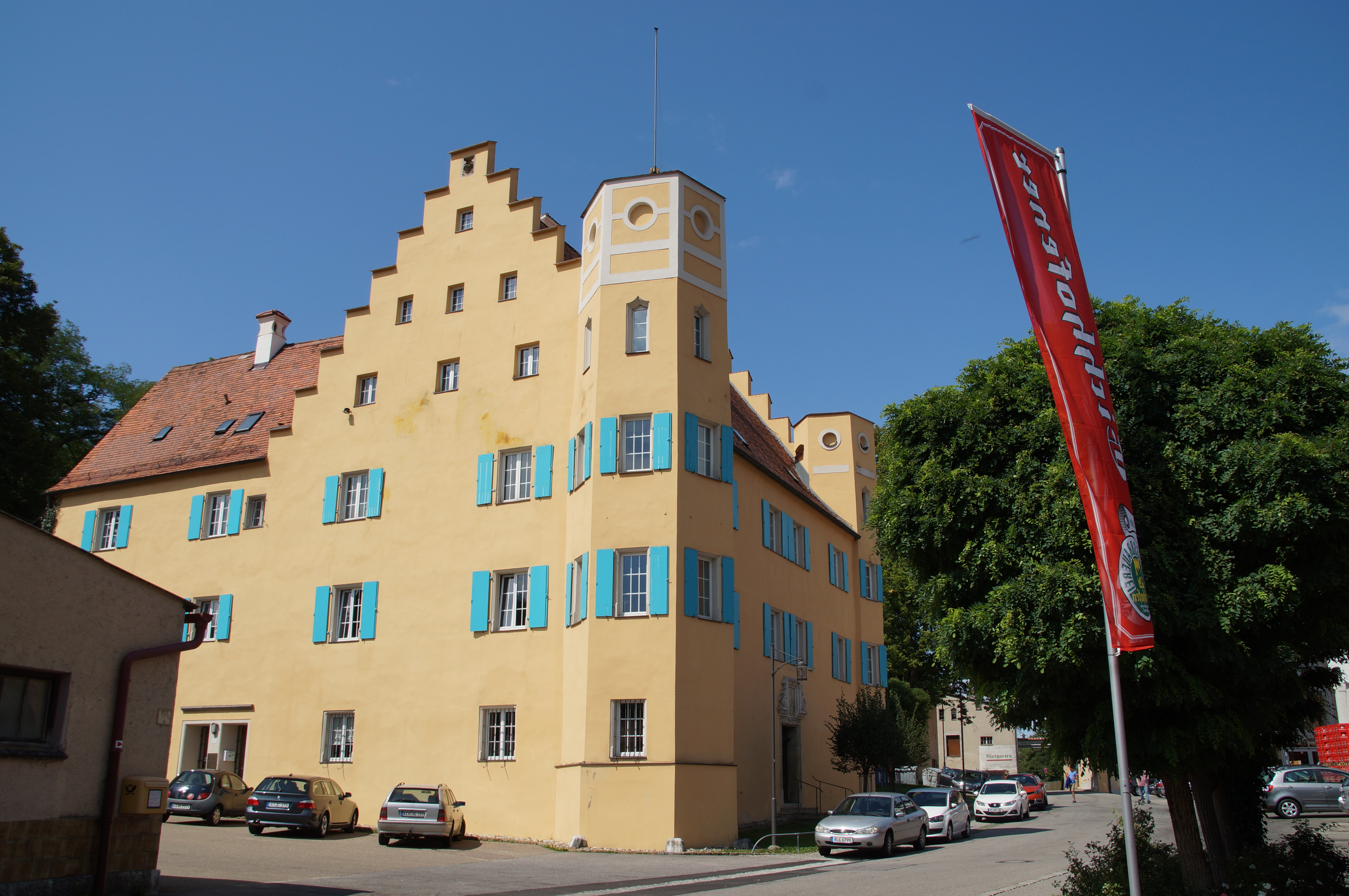
- Eichhofen Castle

- Coat of arms

- Location of Nittendorf within Regensburg district
- Interactive map of Nittendorf
- Location within Germany Location within Bavaria
- Coordinates: 49°01′32″N 11°57′32″E
- Country: Germany
- State: Bavaria
- Admin. region: Oberpfalz
- District: Regensburg

Government
  - Mayor (2020–26): Helmut Sammüller (FW)

Area
  - Total: 32.90 km^{2} (12.70 sq mi)
- Elevation: 342–518 m (1,122–1,699 ft)

Population (2025-12-31)
  - Total: 8,769
  - Density: 266.5/km^{2} (690.3/sq mi)
- Time zone: UTC+01:00 (CET)
  - Summer (DST): UTC+02:00 (CEST)
- Postal codes: 93152
- Dialling codes: 09404
- Vehicle registration: R
- Website: www.nittendorf.de

Nittendorf is a municipality in the district of Regensburg in Bavaria in Germany.

Loch Castle, a rare example of a Bavarian cave castle, is located within the municipality.
