= Loch Castle (Eichhofen) =

Castle in Bavaria

- Burg Loch
- Nittendorf
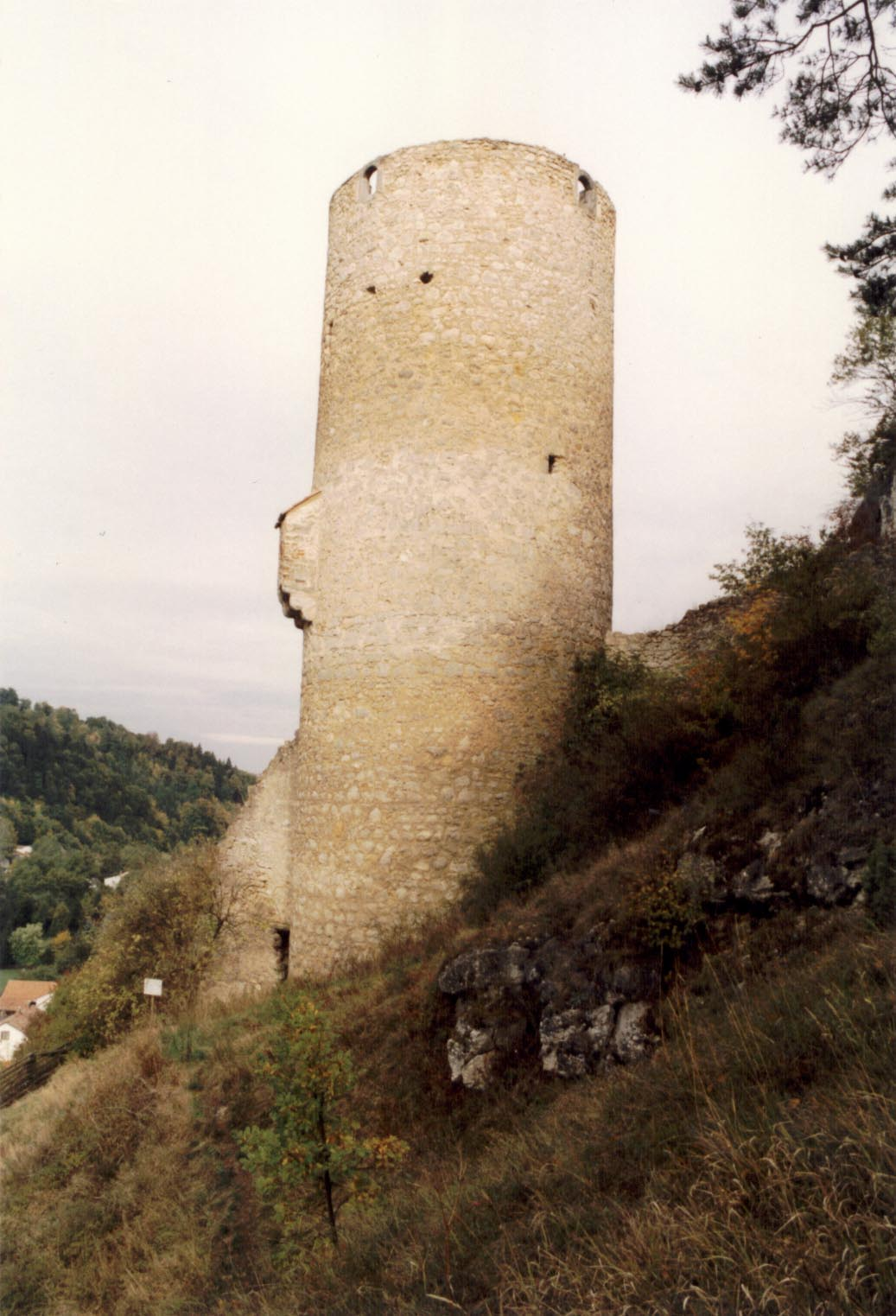
- South side of the bergfried (1990)

Site information
- Type: hill castle, cave castle
- Code: DE-BY
- Condition: preserved or largely preserved

Location
- Coordinates: 49°00′54″N 11°55′44″E

Site history
- Built: First recorded in the 12th century

Loch Castle (German: Burg Loch) is a protected ruin in the municipality of Loch in the Bavarian market borough of Nittendorf. It is also the symbol of Eichhofen, a village within the borough.

Loch is a rare example of a cave castle in Bavaria; only in Stein an der Traun in Upper Bavaria is there another surviving example of this type of fortification.

== History ==
The foundation date of the little hill castle is not precisely known. Historians believe it was built either in the 12th or the 14th century. Its founders were the Rammelsteins, lords of a nearby estate and ministeriales of the burgraves of Regensburg. They erected the castle to guard a hammer mill.

In 1556, when the last male Rammelstein, Sebastian, died there was an inheritance dispute over the castle and its associated estates. In his will, Sebastian had left the site to his wife, Margareta, but his nephew, Wolf Heinrich Sauerzapf, who had married Sebastian’s sister, Magdalena, protested. The ensuing dispute was not resolved until 1573, when a ruling gave Loch Castle to the Sauerzapfs.

No later than 1625, their descendant, Veit Philipp Sauerzapf, moved his residence to neighbouring Schönhofen, because he felt the castle was too uncomfortable to live in. Since then, the building has stood empty and was no longer used. It gradually fell into ruins.

After his death in 1714, Christoph von Sauerzapf granted Loch Castle to the Carthusian abbey of Prüll in Regensburg. In the wake of secularisation it was seized by the Bavarian state and ended up in the hands of the landlords of Eichhofen.

Its last owners were Günther and Dietlinde von Braunbehrens, née Freiin von Werthern, and their descendant, Ingeborg Schönharting, née Braunbehrens. This family devoted themselves for some time to the preservation of the castle, but had to sell it for financial reasons and had themselves taken off the land registry. Since then the castle has been ownerless. Responsibility for it belongs to the Free State of Bavaria, within whose borders the castle ruins are located.

== Description ==
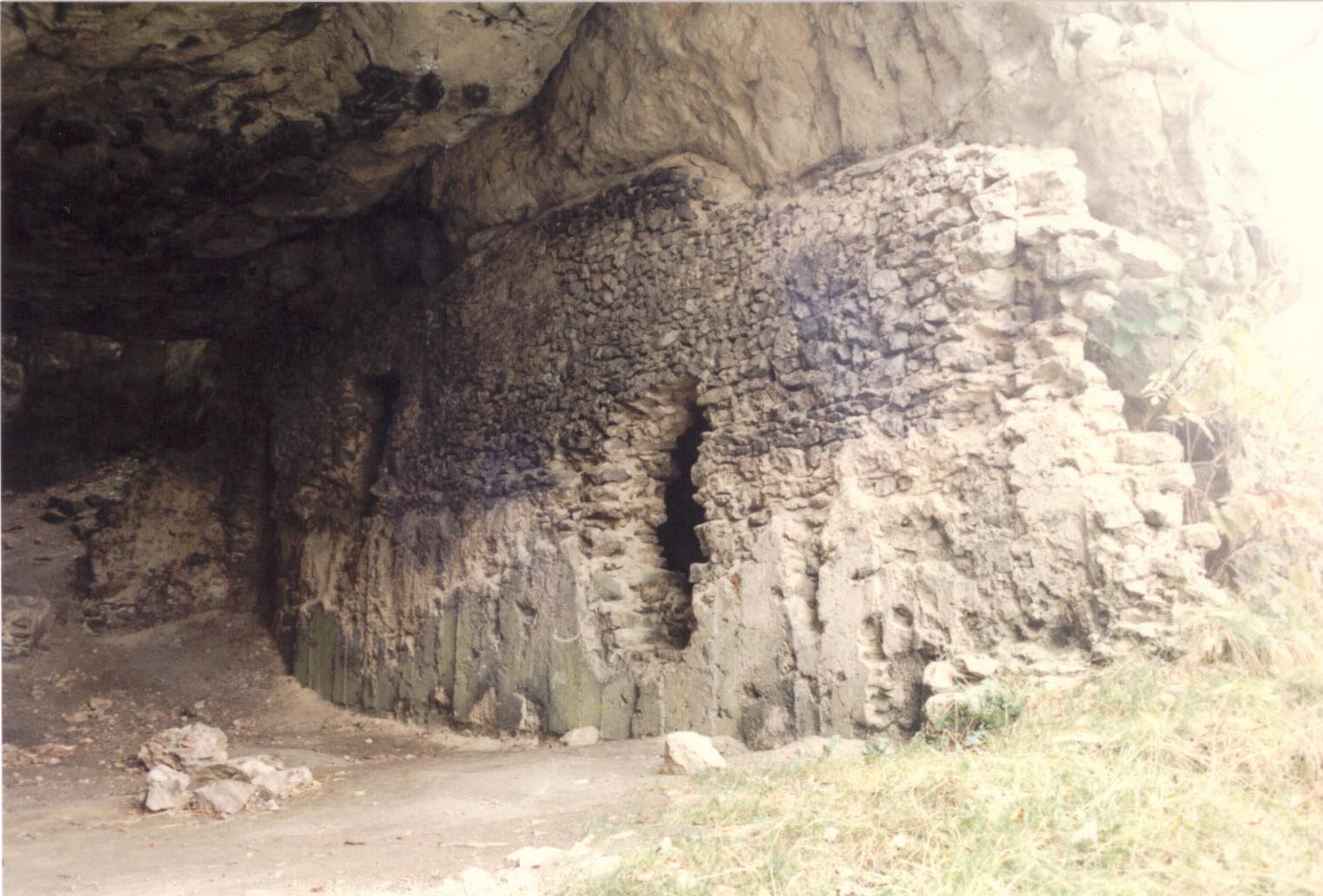
Wall of the residential wing of the cave (1990)

Loch Castle consists of two caves sealed by stone walls. These caves are connected to a labyrinth of smaller rooms in the cave system. The largest space, with a floor area of 12.5 × 7 metres, was used as a residential area and was panelled with wood. It was heated by a fireplace that may still be seen today. The ceiling of this room has partly collapsed since the castle was abandoned, leaving it open to the surface. As a result, it may be entered from both the downhill and uphill sides. There are still brick walls and door spaces in this room. The cave is two storeys high, but the upper floor only has a small chamber. In addition other buildings were built outside the cave, against the rock face. The area around the cave was surrounded by a high curtain wall and protected by a zwinger.

The round bergfried of French design was placed immediately in front of the cave and is the only building that has survived intact. It is visible from a long way off. The roughly 22-metre-high tower is made of rusticated ashlar and has two-metre-thick walls at the base, reducing to 50 centimetres thickness by the 4th storey. Judging by its windows and garderobe (of which some of the medieval wooden elements have survived), it was designed as a relatively comfortable residence. Access was via an elevated entrance. It was restored in 1989.

== Literature ==
- Andreas Boos: Burgen im Süden der Oberpfalz ("Castles in Southern Upper Palatinate"). Universitätsverlag Regensburg, Regensburg, 1998, ISBN 3-930480-03-4, pp. 429–432.
- Ursula Pfistermeister: Burgen der Oberpfalz ("Castles of Upper Palatinate"). Verlag Friedrich Pustet, Regensburg 1974, ISBN 3-7917-0394-3, p. 91.
