= Stein Castle (Bavaria) =

Coordinates: 47.986625°N 12.546381°E

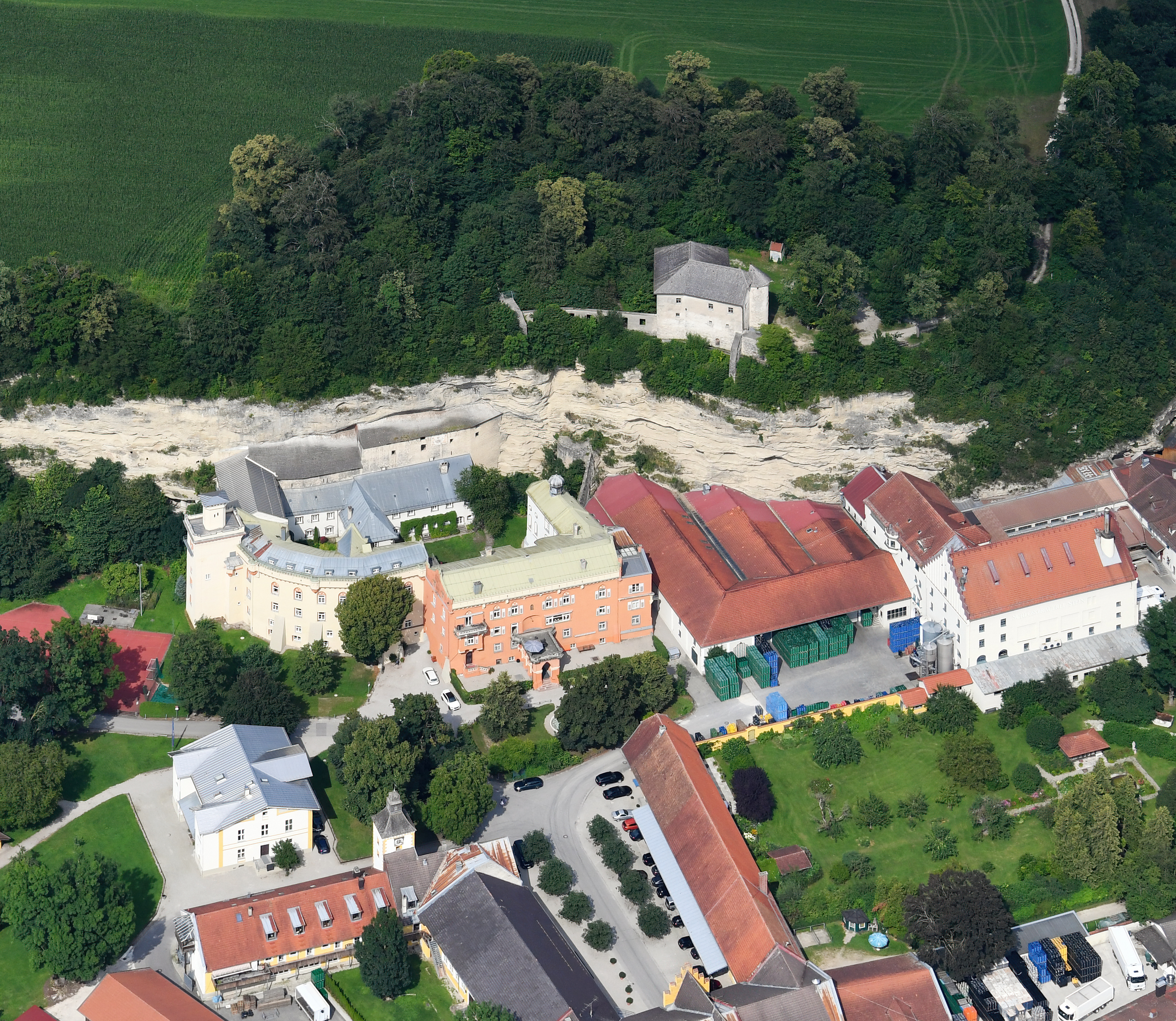
Aerial view of Schloss Stein an der Traun

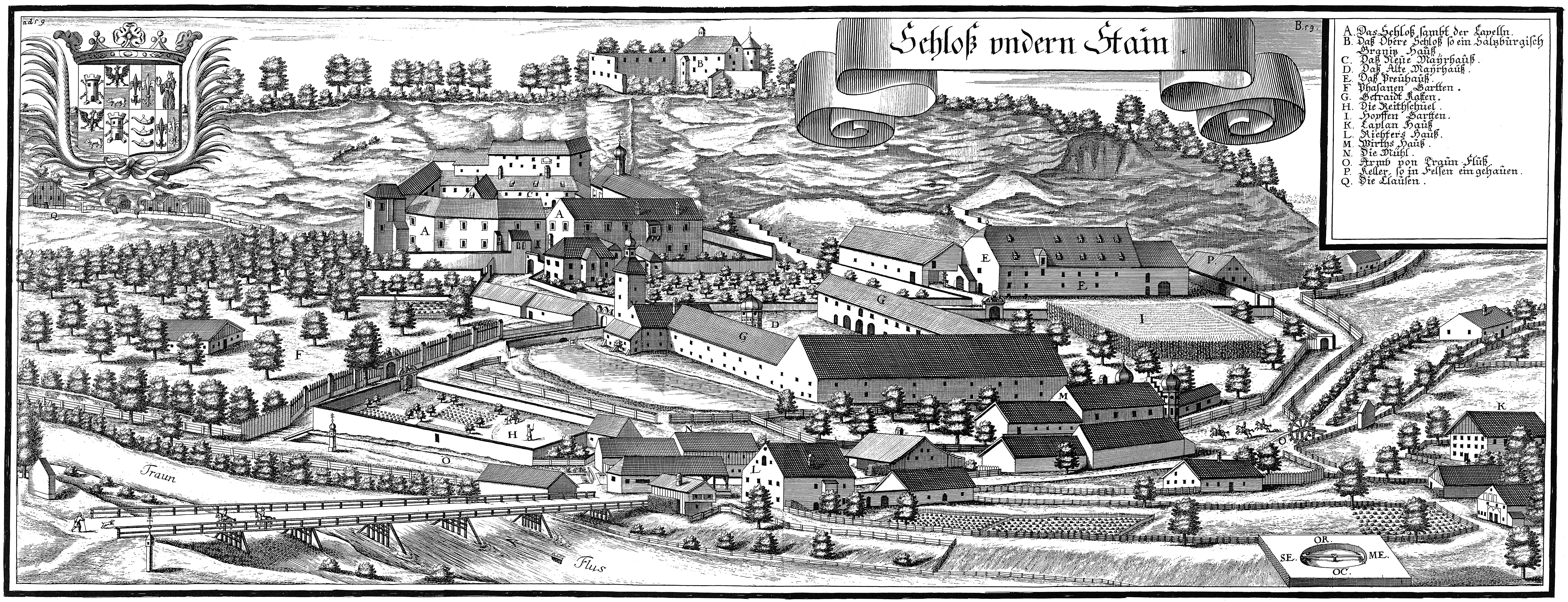
Copperplate by Michael Wening in Topographia Bavariae around 1700

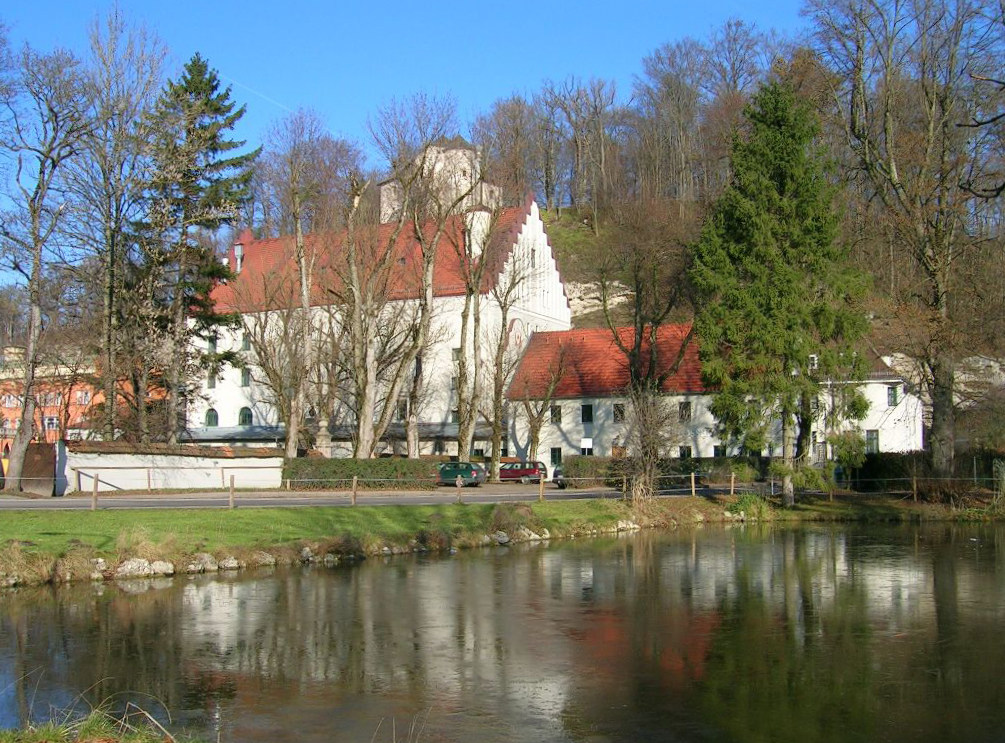
The castle site in Stein an der Traun

Stein Castle (German: Schloss Stein) in Stein an der Traun is the most important cave castle in Germany.

The castle comprises three elements:

- the upper house on the almost 50 metre high steeply sloping nagelfluh rock face;
- the cave castle beneath it, which hides a passage to the Traun valley in the rock;
- the lower house in Stein itself.

== History ==
The origins of the upper house are not totally clear. It may have stemmed from a fortification dating to the Roman or Celtic period. Stein was first recorded in 1135. The romantic figure of the legendary robber knight, Hainz von Stein dem Wilden, is closely associated with the castle. He is supposed to have lived in the castle in the early 13th century and was written about for the first time by Lorenz Huebner in 1783 in a "tragic drama about the fatherland".

The castle itself was in the possession of the Toerring family from the 13th century to 1633 . Albert von Toerring-Stein was the Bishop of Regensburg from 1613 to 1649. Adam Lorenz von Toerring-Stein held the same office from 1663 to 1666.

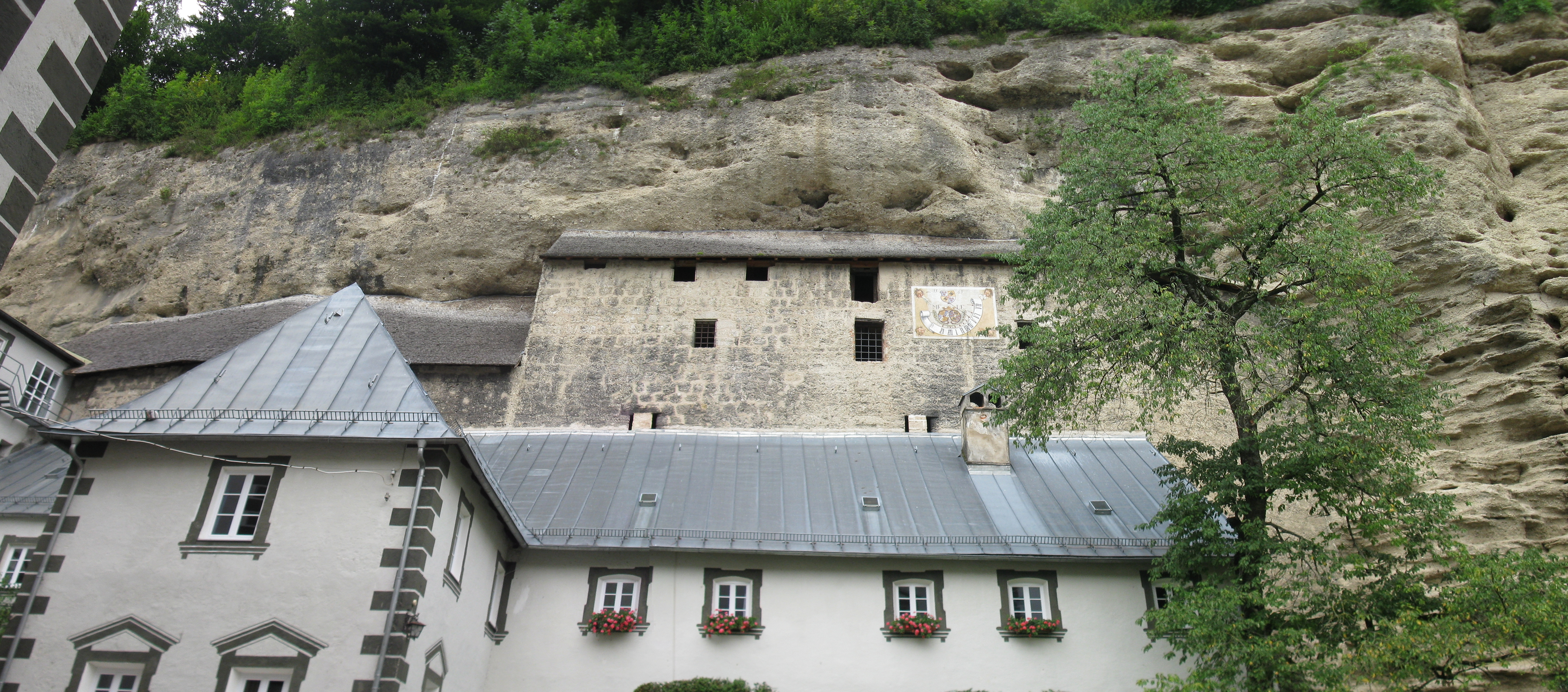
The cave castle seen from Stein

Count Carl Fugger von Kirchberg bought the property from the Toerrings in 1633. Later it passed by marriage to the lords (Freiherren) of Lösch.

In 1818 a 2nd class patrimonial court was established in the old Hofmark in the wake of reforms in Bavaria. In 1845 Amélie de Beauharnais, widow of the emperor of Brazil, bought Stein Castle for herself and her daughter. In 1848 she ceded the Stein Court to the state as compensation.

In 1890 Stein Castle went to Count Joseph zu Arco-Zinneberg. In 1928 the Arco-Zinneberg had to cut down the great St. George's Forest in order to sell the wood to get out of debt. Despite that they had to sell up, the forest was possessed by the state and was immediately reforested.

Upper house, rock castle and lower house are today the property of the newly built Stein Castle Brewery (Schlossbrauerei Stein), founded in 1907, which has been in the ownership of the Wiskott family since 1934. The lower house in Stein has housed a private boarding school since 1948, the Schule Schloss Stein.
