= Neuburg Castle (Switzerland) =

Ruined castle in Untervaz in the Canton of Graubünden in Switzerland

Burg Neuburg
- Untervaz
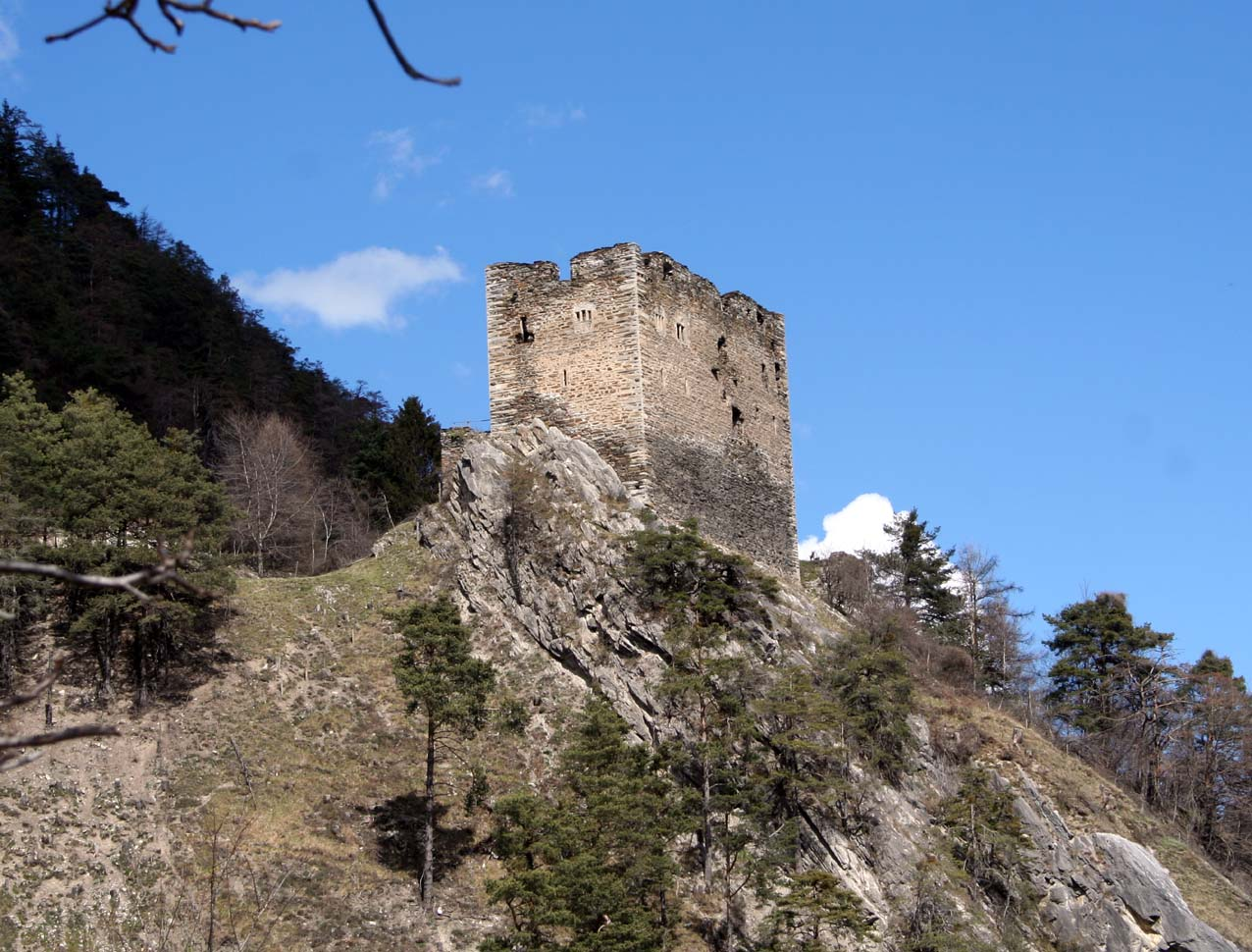
- Neuburg Castle ruins

Site information
- Type: hill castle
- Code: CH-GR
- Condition: ruin

Location
- Coordinates: 46°54′46″N 09°32′39″E
- Height: 600 m above the sea

Site history
- Built: about 1300

Neuburg Castle is a ruined castle in Untervaz in the Canton of Graubünden in Switzerland. It is a Swiss heritage site of national significance.

== History ==
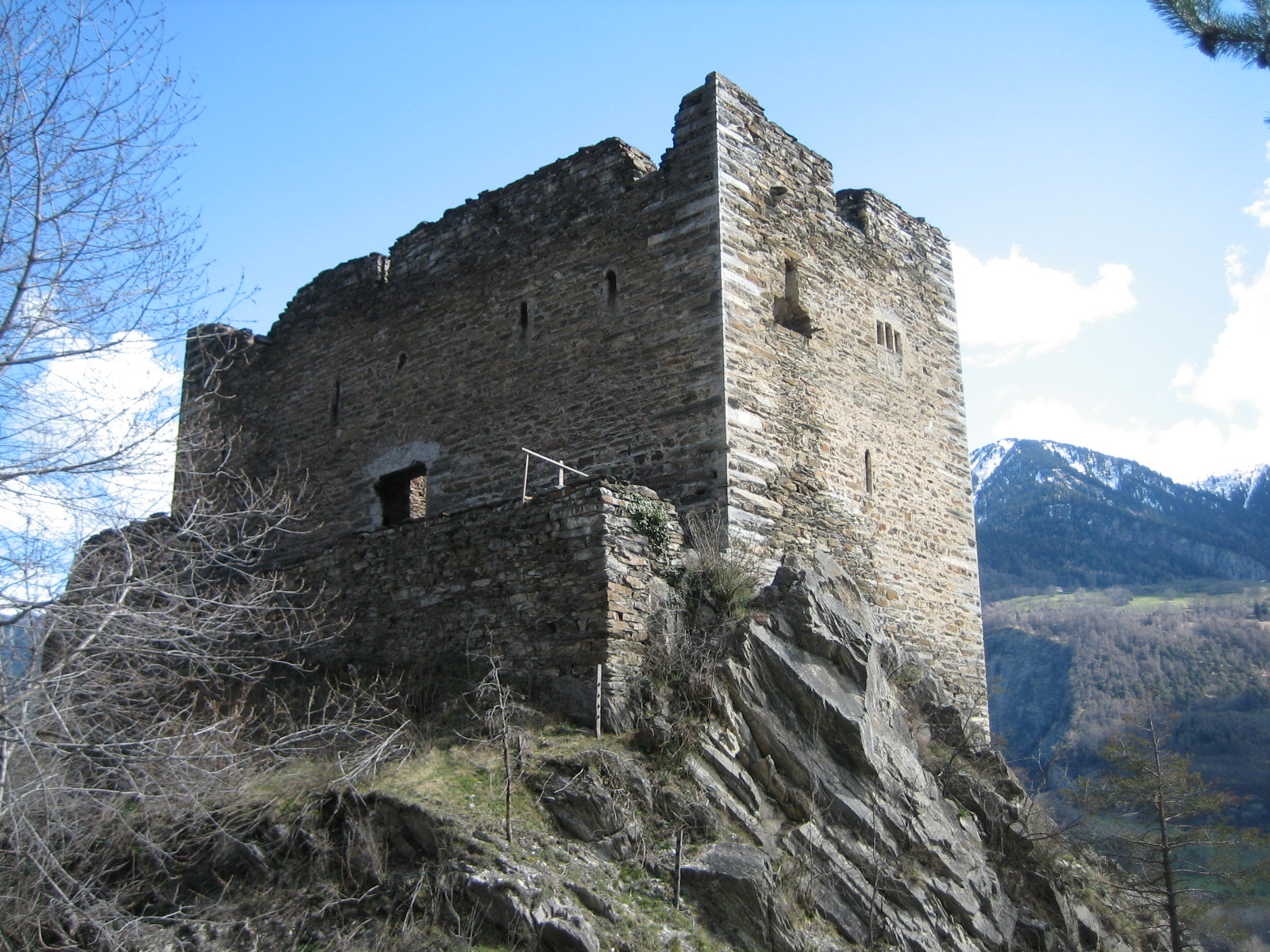
Ruins of Castle Neuburg

Castle Neuburg was first built during the late 13th century or early 14th, most likely for the Baron Tumb von Neuburg from Vorarlberg. It is unclear whether there was an earlier castle or why the Tumb von Neuburg family acquired land in Graubünden. It was first mentioned in 1345 as Nüwburg. In 1360 they had to give the castle to Heinz and Martin Buwix as collateral for a loan, but by 1385 they were back in possession of the castle. In 1396 Frik Tumb quarreled with Ulrich Brun von Rhäzüns, which led to a feud between the two families and Neuburg Castle being besieged. In 1400 Johann von Neuburg became a vassal to the Bishop of Chur to protect his claim to the castle.

About 1450 it came under the control of Rudolf von Rappenstein or von Mötteli. In 1496 it was sold to the Bishop of Chur, who appointed a bailiff to administer the estates. In the following years, the castle was expanded, but during the 16th century it was abandoned and fell into ruin. Then, in 1577 the municipality bought the castle and associated barony. In the 16th century, the site was abandoned and began to collapse.

== Castle site ==
The castle site includes the still visible rectangular keep, which is one of the largest in Raetia. The keep was four stories tall and was about 12 by 29 meters (39 ft × 95 ft) in size. The original high entrance was located on the west, about 2 m (6.6 ft) above ground level. The tower was divided into three parts by large interior walls. North and west of the keep, the foundations and portions of the curtain wall and gatehouse are still visible. In the northern courtyard, there is a large round cistern. The castle was repeatedly expanded. The original structure included arcades, detached kitchens and sinks.

The walls were about 1.5 m (4 ft 11 in) thick at the base, though they thinned out as they rose. On the mountain side of the castle site, a 2 m (6 ft 7 in) high gate led to the middle section of the castle.

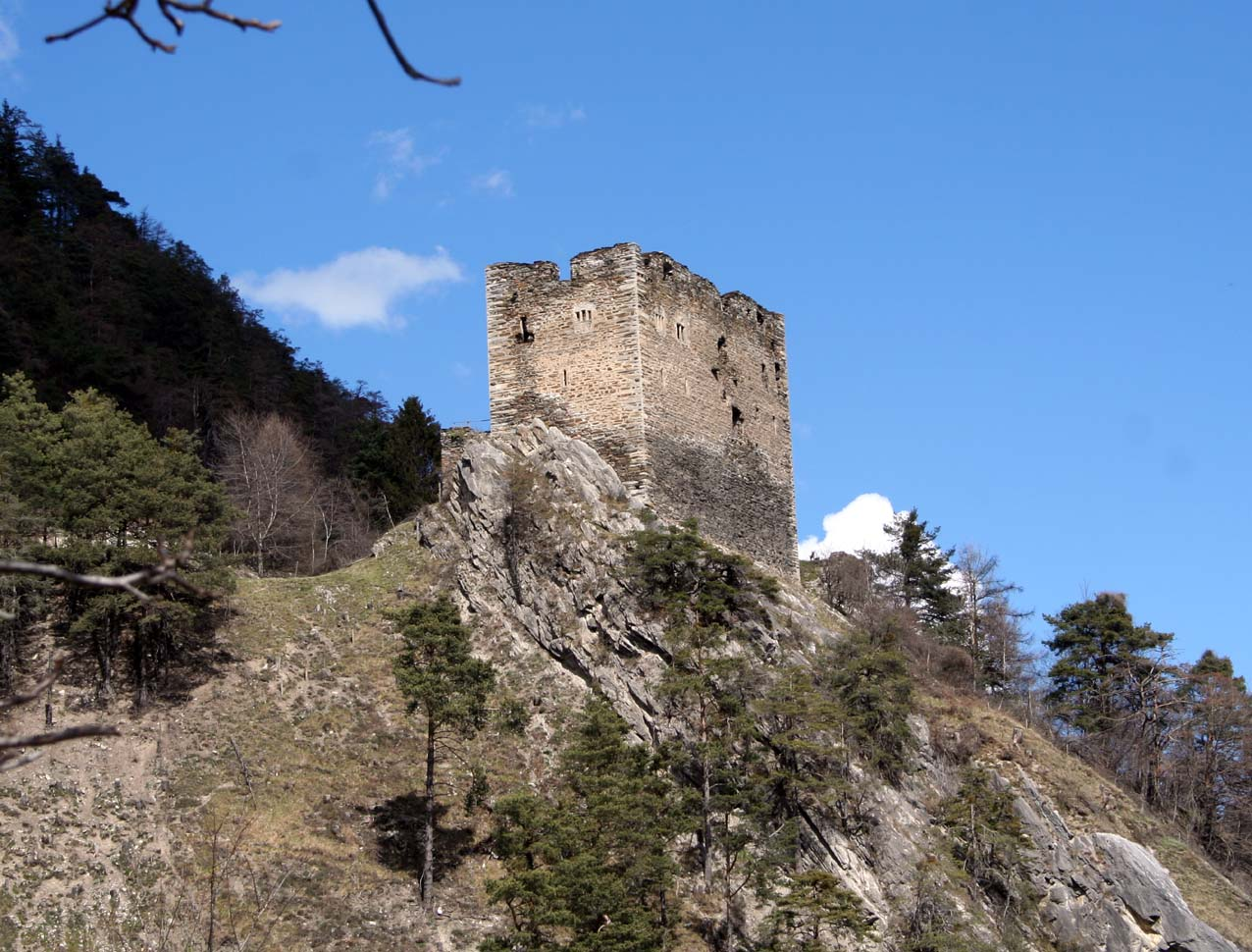
Location of Ruine Neuburg

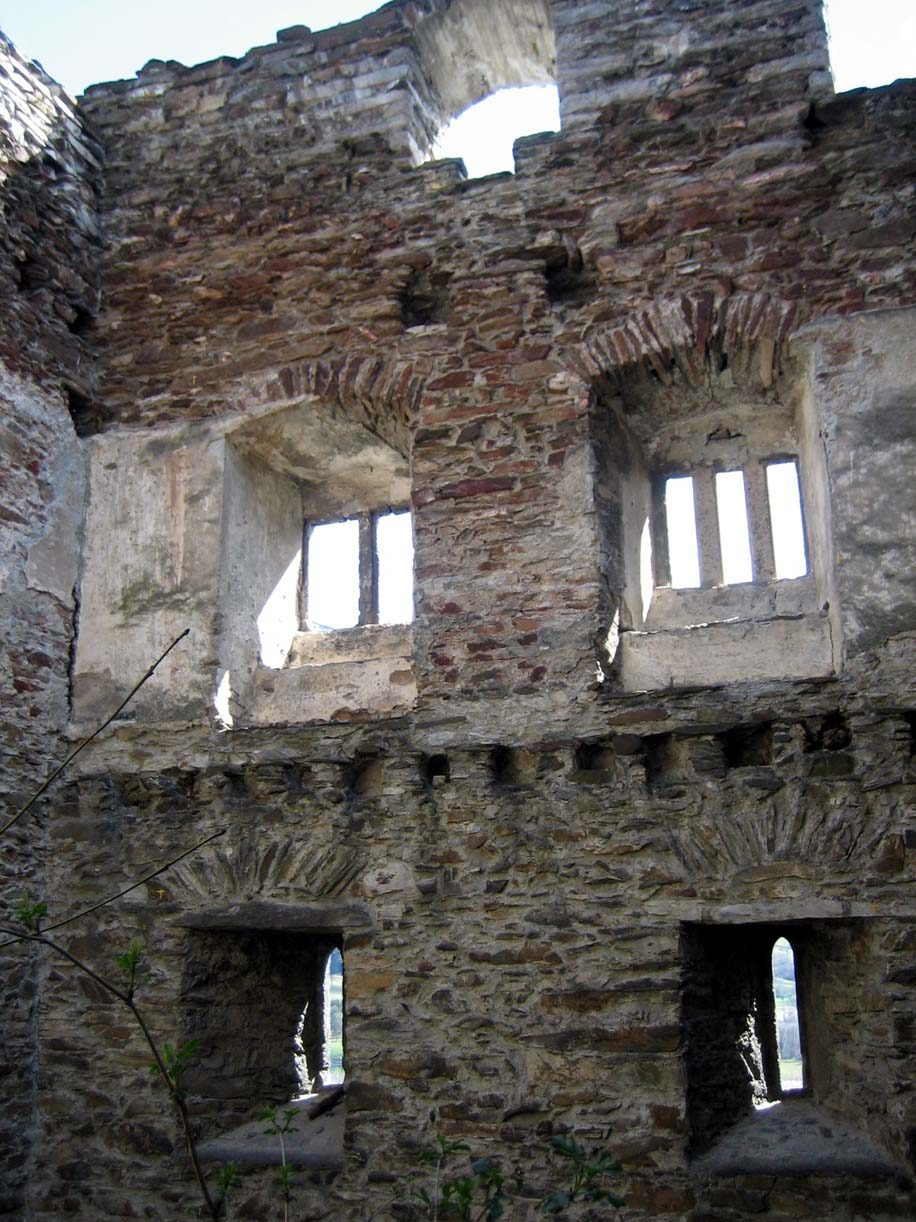
Interior of the castle, living quarters

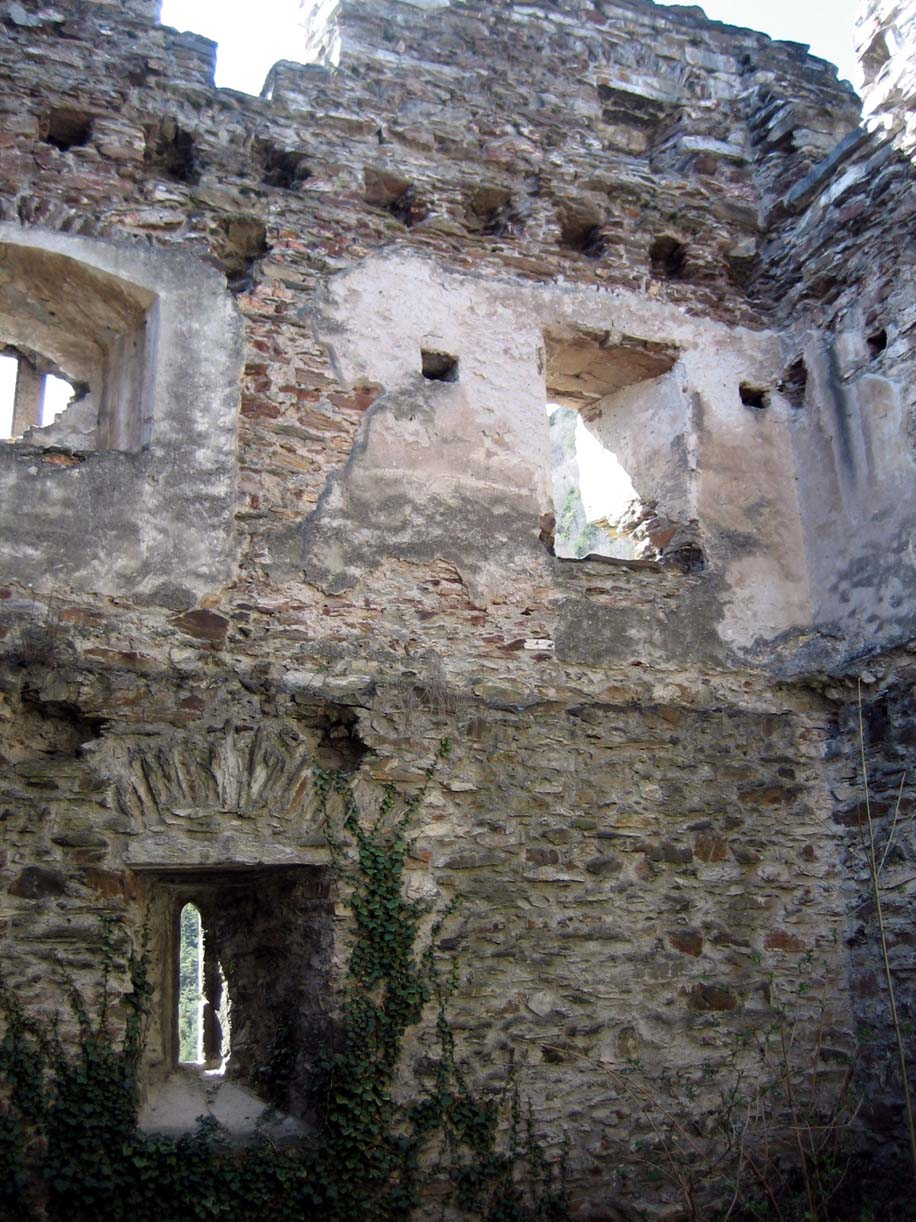
Interior of the castle, living quarters

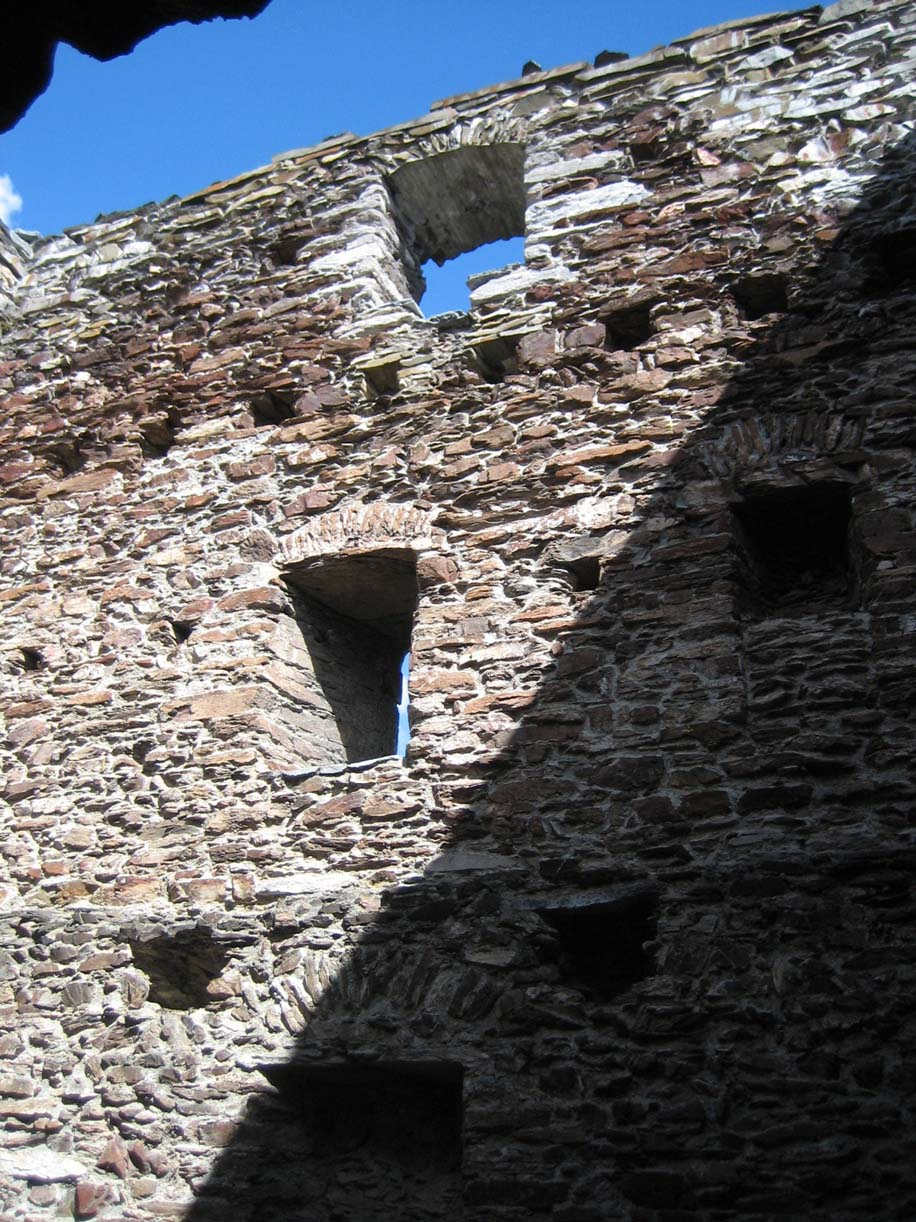
Interior of the castle, fourth storey

== See also ==
- List of castles in Switzerland
