= Andiast =

- Former municipality
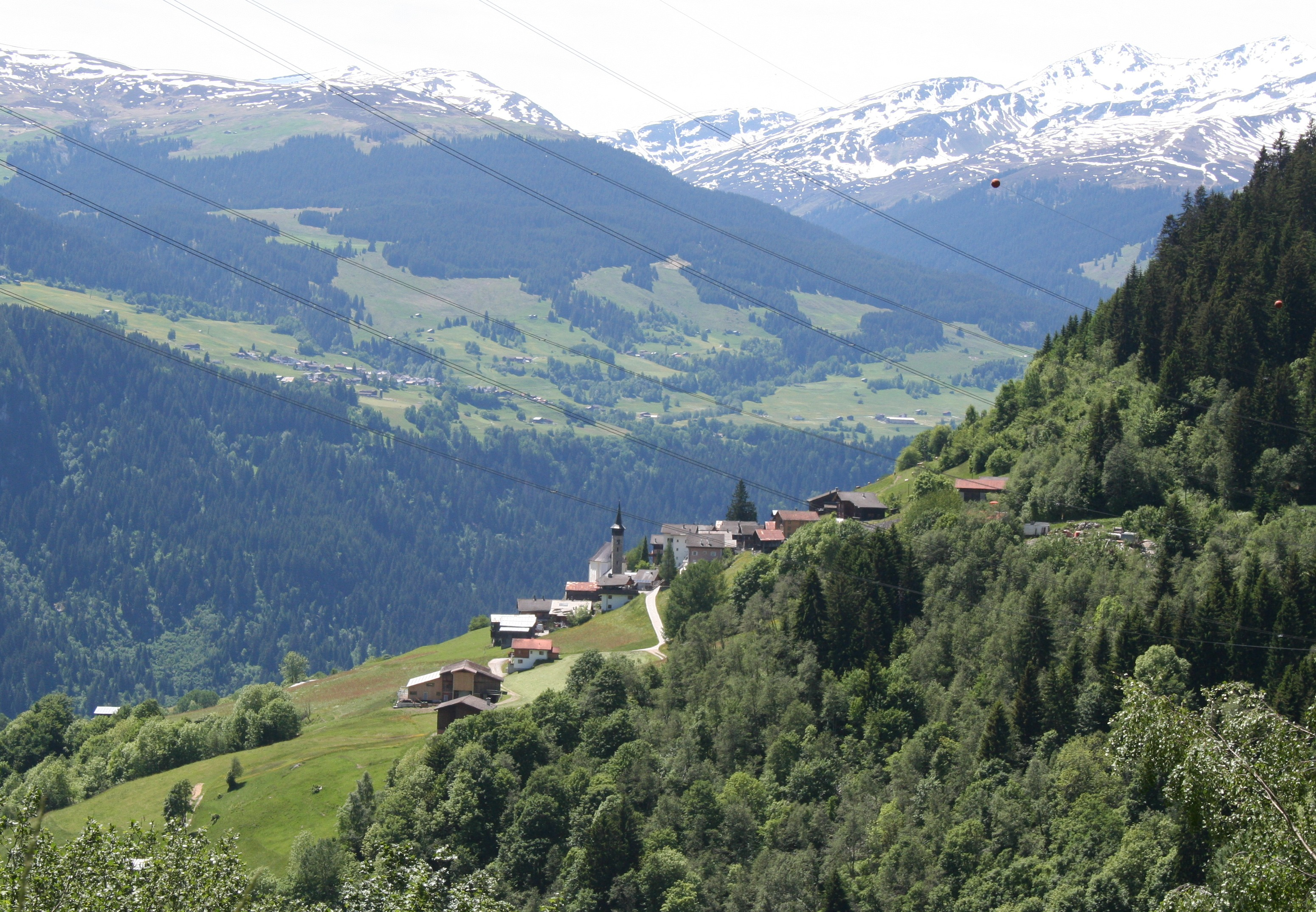

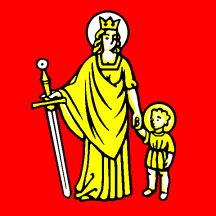
- Flag Coat of arms
- Location of Andiast
- Location within Switzerland Location within Canton of Graubünden
- Coordinates: 46°47′N 9°7′E
- Country: Switzerland
- Canton: Graubünden
- District: Surselva

Area
  - Total: 13.63 km^{2} (5.26 sq mi)
- Elevation: 1,178 m (3,865 ft)

Population (December 2020)
  - Total: 211
  - Density: 15.5/km^{2} (40.1/sq mi)
- Time zone: UTC+01:00 (CET)
  - Summer (DST): UTC+02:00 (CEST)
- Postal code: 7159
- SFOS number: 3611
- ISO 3166 code: CH-GR
- Surrounded by: Glarus Süd (GL), Pigniu, Rueun, Waltensburg/Vuorz
- Website: www.vuorz-andiast.ch

Andiast ([anˈdɪ̯aʃt]) is a former municipality in the Surselva Region in the Swiss canton of Graubünden. Until 1943, it was known as Andest.

Lying close to the ski resorts of Waltensburg/Vuorz and Breil/Brigels, Andiast is known for its winter sports.

On 1 January 2018 the former municipalities of Andiast and Waltensburg/Vuorz merged into the municipality of Breil/Brigels.

== History ==
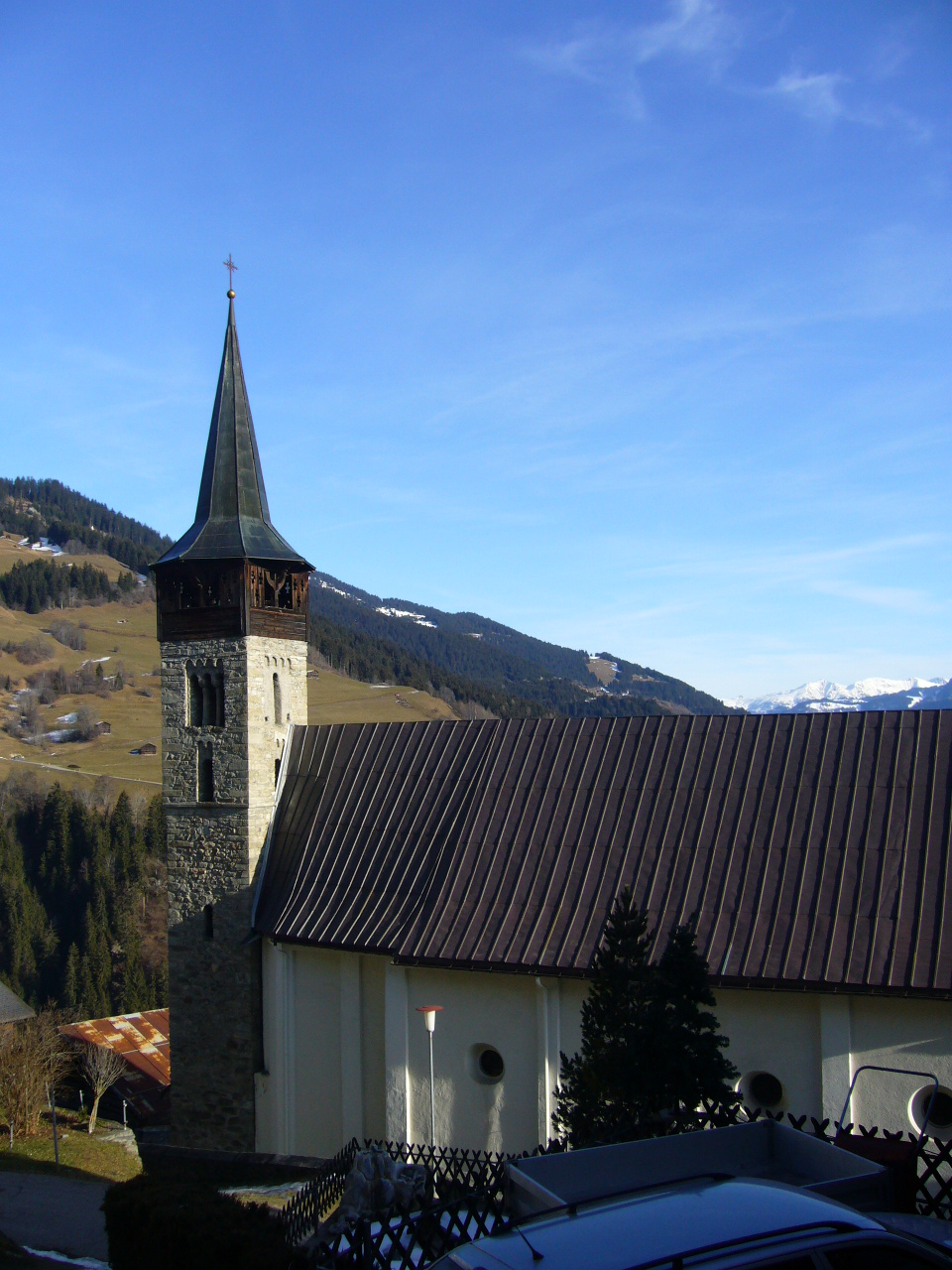
Village church of Andiast

Aerial view (1957)

The area around Andiast was already inhabited in the Stone Age, as was confirmed by an archaeological dig in 1962. The first mention of the area is documented in 765 in the will of a Bishop Tello when it was mentioned as Andeste.

On September 8, 1526, Andiast was separated from the parish of Waltensburg/Vuorz and became an independent parish. It was influenced by the Reformation, and in contrast to its parent parish, Andiast stayed Catholic.

On October 8 and 9, 1799, the population was involved in the wars of the French Revolution. The French troops had driven Russian General Alexander Suvorov with his starving troops over the Alps in storm and snow. They staggered over the Panixer Pass and plundered the village.

== Coat of arms ==
The description of the municipal coat of arms is Gules St. Julitta clad Or holding a downpointed sword Argent handled of the second leading a child. The coat of arms represents the village church which is consecrated to St. Julietta and the old village seal.

== Geography ==
Andiast has an area, as of 2006, of 13.6 km^{2} (5.3 sq mi). Of this area, 42.4% is used for agricultural purposes, while 26.8% is forested. Of the rest of the land, 1.7% is settled (buildings or roads) and the remainder (29.1%) is non-productive (rivers, glaciers or mountains).

Before 2017, the municipality was located in the Ruis sub-district of the Surselva district, after 2017 it was part of the Surselva Region. It consists of the linear village of Andiast at an elevation of 1,185 m (3,888 ft) on the southern face of the Tödi mountain chain.

== Demographics ==
Andiast has a population (as of 31 December 2020) of 211. As of 2007, 4.4% of the population was made up of foreign nationals. Over the last 10 years the population has decreased at a rate of -13.1%. Most of the population (as of 2000) speaks Romansh (85.8%), with German being second most common (12.9%) and French being third ( 0.4%).

As of 2000, the gender distribution of the population was 52.7% male and 47.3% female. The age distribution, as of 2000, in Andiast is; 35 children or 15.1% of the population are between 0 and 9 years old and 30 teenagers or 12.9% are between 10 and 19. Of the adult population, 16 people or 6.9% of the population are between 20 and 29 years old. 30 people or 12.9% are between 30 and 39, 24 people or 10.3% are between 40 and 49, and 25 people or 10.8% are between 50 and 59. The senior population distribution is 25 people or 10.8% of the population are between 60 and 69 years old, 37 people or 15.9% are between 70 and 79, there are 10 people or 4.3% who are between 80 and 89.

In the 2007 federal election the most popular party was the FDP which received 42.1% of the vote. The next three most popular parties were the CVP (33.1%), the SVP (20%) and the SP (3.7%).

The entire Swiss population is generally well educated. In Andiast about 62.7% of the population (between age 25–64) have completed either non-mandatory upper secondary education or additional higher education (either university or a Fachhochschule).

Andiast has an unemployment rate of 0.51%. As of 2005, there were 39 people employed in the primary economic sector and about 15 businesses involved in this sector. 11 people are employed in the secondary sector and there are 3 businesses in this sector. 21 people are employed in the tertiary sector, with 8 businesses in this sector.

The historical population is given in the following table:

year	population
1850	242
1900	235
1950	309
2000	232
