= Waltensburg/Vuorz =

- Former municipality
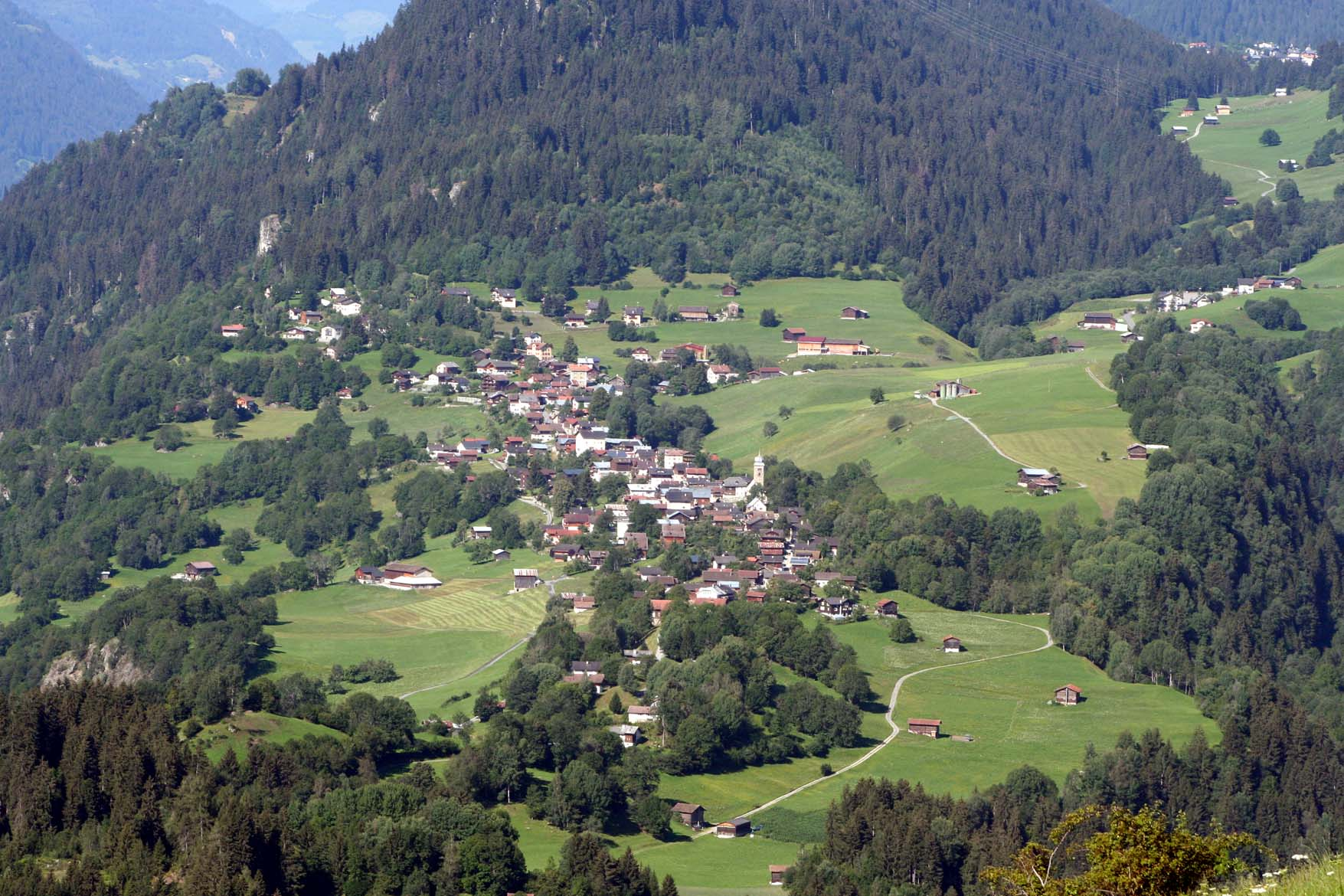

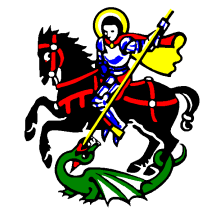
- Flag Coat of arms
- Location of Waltensburg/Vuorz
- Location within Switzerland Location within Canton of Graubünden
- Coordinates: 46°46′N 9°07′E
- Country: Switzerland
- Canton: Graubünden
- District: Surselva

Area
  - Total: 32.32 km^{2} (12.48 sq mi)
- Elevation: 1,003 m (3,291 ft)

Population (December 2020)
  - Total: 325
  - Density: 10.1/km^{2} (26.0/sq mi)
- Time zone: UTC+01:00 (CET)
  - Summer (DST): UTC+02:00 (CEST)
- Postal code: 7158
- SFOS number: 3616
- ISO 3166 code: CH-GR
- Surrounded by: Andiast, Breil/Brigels, Linthal (GL), Obersaxen, Rueun
- Website: www.vuorz-andiast.ch

Waltensburg/Vuorz is a former municipality in the Surselva Region in the canton of Graubünden in Switzerland. On 1 January 2018 the former municipalities of Andiast and Waltensburg/Vuorz merged into the municipality of Breil/Brigels.

== History ==
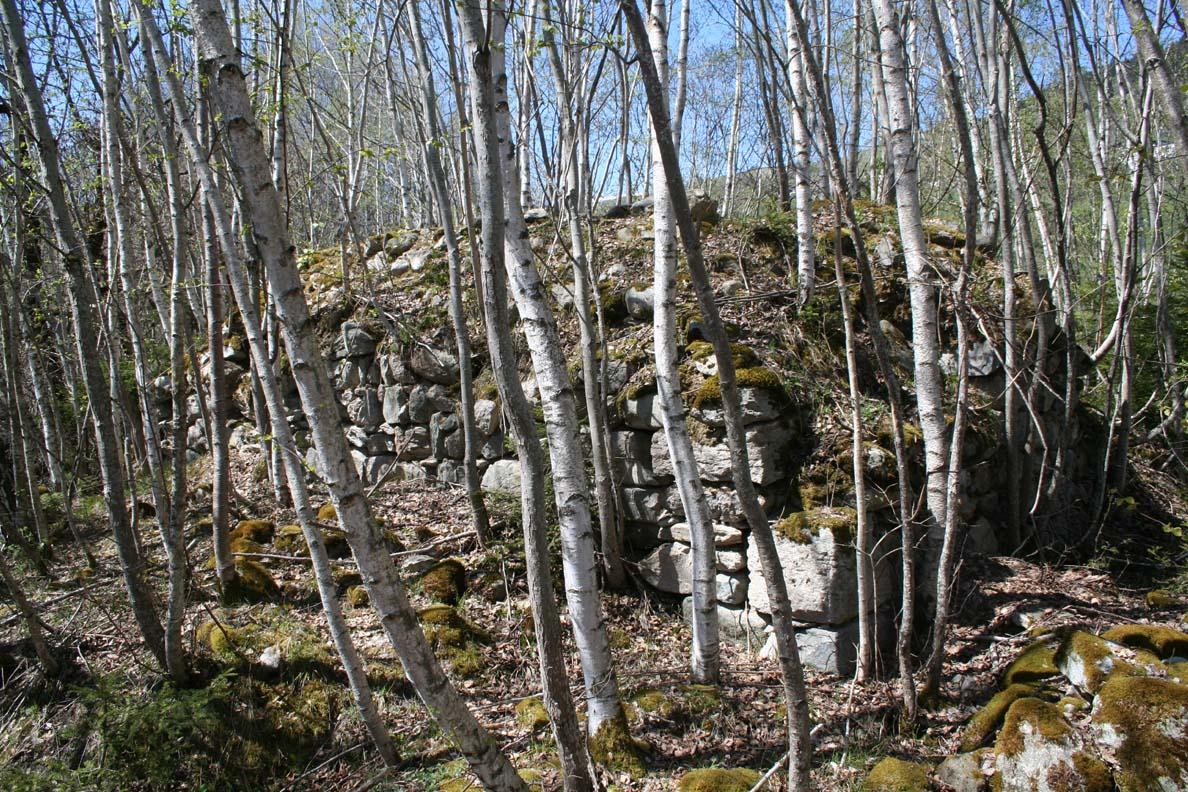
Ruins of Castle Grünenfels

Waltensburg/Vuorz was first mentioned in 765 as Vorce. The German name of Waltensburg is first mentioned in 1209 as Waltramsburg, which was an older name of the castle Jörgenberg. While the Romansh speaking population used the older, Romansh name of Vorce (meaning: "a river fork") the former name of the castle moved to include the village. At about the same time, the castle came to be known as Jörgenberg from the name of the nearby early medieval fortified Church of St George.

In the Middle Ages, the nearby settlements on Ladral (1,530 m (5,020 ft)) and Jörgenberg belonged to Waltensburg. In the area surrounding Waltensburg/Vuorz there are three other medieval fortresses, Grünenfels (Romansh: Chischlatsch), home of the Freiherren of Grünenfels in the 13th century, Kropfenstein and Vogelberg (Romansh: Cafoghel).

In 1734 the municipality of Waltensburg, which at that time included Rueun, Siat, Pigniu, Andiast and Schlans, bought the last rights of the Jörgenberg fief. The parish church of St. Leodegar is first mentioned in 1241. The parish of Waltensburg included Andiast until 1526, when Waltensburg was the only municipality in the Bündner Oberland that converted to the Reformed faith. A procession from Roman Catholic Andiast through Waltensburg toward Rueun in 1682 started the Fahnenkrieg (Flag War) in the valley.

Until 1963 the municipality was financially stable from water and forest use taxes and did not have property taxes. However, starting in 1961 many of the small farms began to combine into a few larger operations which led to the emigration of many farmers to Ilanz, Domat/Ems and Chur. The growth of tourism in many Romansh villages has brought some of this population back.

== Coat of arms ==
The blazon of the municipal coat of arms is Argent St. George armoured Azure caped Gules and Or and haloed and with lance of the last riding a Horse Sable harnessed of the third killing a Dragon Vert. The coat of arms features St. George who is the patron saint of the church and who the castle, Burg Jörgenberg, is named after.

== Geography ==
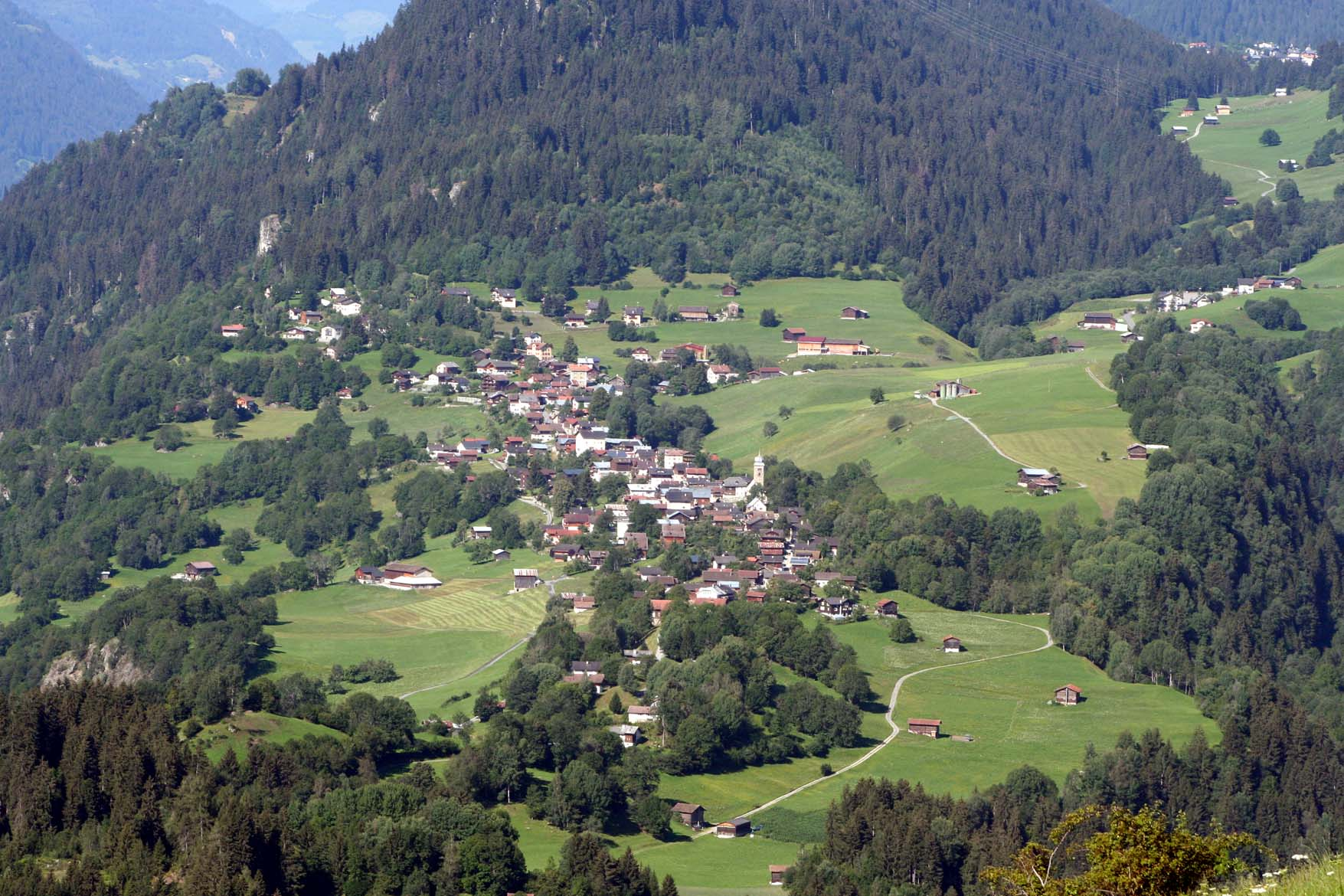
Waltensburg/Vuorz

Aerial view (1957)

The village of Waltensburg/Vuorz is a linear village located, before 2017, in the Ruis sub-district of the Surselva district, at an elevation of 1,008 m (3,307 ft) on a terrace north of, and some 250 m (820 ft) above the Vorderrhein. Until 1943 Waltensburg/Vuorz was known as Waltensburg.

The municipality of Waltensburg/Vuorz has an area, as of 2006, of 32.3 km^{2} (12.5 sq mi). This includes land on both sides of the Vorderrhein, and rising on the north side to the summit of the mountain of Ruchi, at an elevation of 3,107 m (10,194 ft) and on the border with the canton of Glarus. Of this area, 36.5% is used for agricultural purposes, while 22% is forested. Of the rest of the land, 1.5% is settled (buildings or roads) and the remainder (39.9%) is non-productive (rivers, glaciers or mountains).

== Demographics ==
Waltensburg/Vuorz has a population (as of 31 December 2020) of 325. As of 2008, 4.7% of the population was made up of foreign nationals. Over the last 10 years the population has decreased at a rate of -11.9%. Most of the population (as of 2000) speaks Romansh (63.4%), with German being second most common (32.4%) and Dutch being third ( 1.3%).

As of 2000, the gender distribution of the population was 49.6% male and 50.4% female. The age distribution, as of 2000, in Waltensburg/Vuorz is; 54 children or 14.1% of the population are between 0 and 9 years old and 57 teenagers or 14.9% are between 10 and 19. Of the adult population, 32 people or 8.4% of the population are between 20 and 29 years old. 48 people or 12.5% are between 30 and 39, 47 people or 12.3% are between 40 and 49, and 44 people or 11.5% are between 50 and 59. The senior population distribution is 40 people or 10.4% of the population are between 60 and 69 years old, 37 people or 9.7% are between 70 and 79, there are 22 people or 5.7% who are between 80 and 89, and there are 2 people or 0.5% who are between 90 and 99.

In the 2007 federal election the most popular party was the SP which received 31.7% of the vote. The next three most popular parties were the SVP (30.5%), the FDP (19.2%) and the CVP (17.4%).

In Waltensburg/Vuorz about 75.7% of the population (between age 25 and 64) have completed either non-mandatory upper secondary education or additional higher education (either university or a Fachhochschule).

Waltensburg/Vuorz has an unemployment rate of 0.6%. As of 2005, there were 46 people employed in the primary economic sector and about 19 businesses involved in this sector. 4 people are employed in the secondary sector and there are 2 businesses in this sector. 58 people are employed in the tertiary sector, with 16 businesses in this sector.

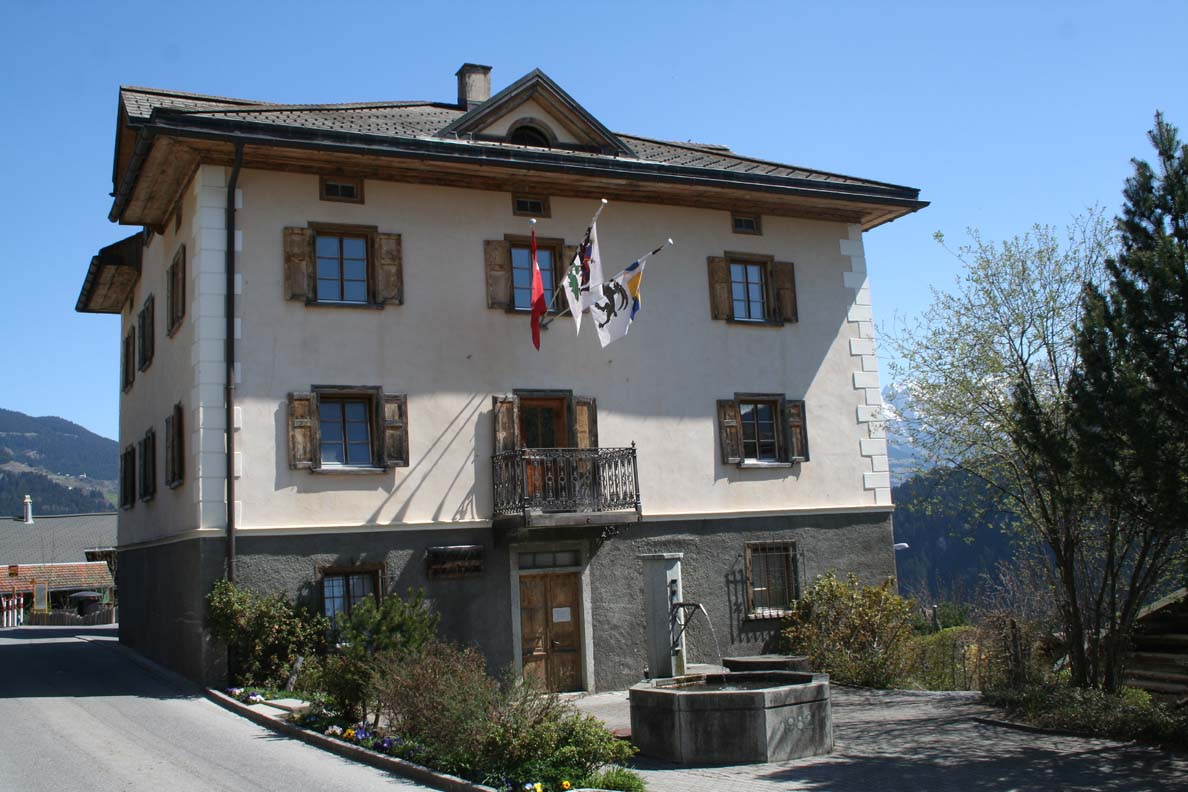
Municipal administration house

The historical population is given in the following table:

year	population
1850	443
1900	362
1930	394
1950	406
1990	349
2000	383
2010	364

== Heritage sites of national significance ==
The Swiss Reformed Church of Waltensburg/Vuorz with frescoes, the prehistoric settlement and medieval castle at Jörgenberg, the Richtstätte / Galgen Fuortgas and the ruins of Kropfenstein Castle are listed as Swiss heritage sites of national significance.

Archeological excavations on the Jörgenberg have uncovered traces of a Bronze Age settlement, an Iron Age Raetian settlement and some Roman items. The Reformed parish church of St. Leodegar was first mentioned in 1241. The frescoes are the work of the unknown Waltensburg Master and were done between 1350 and 1450.

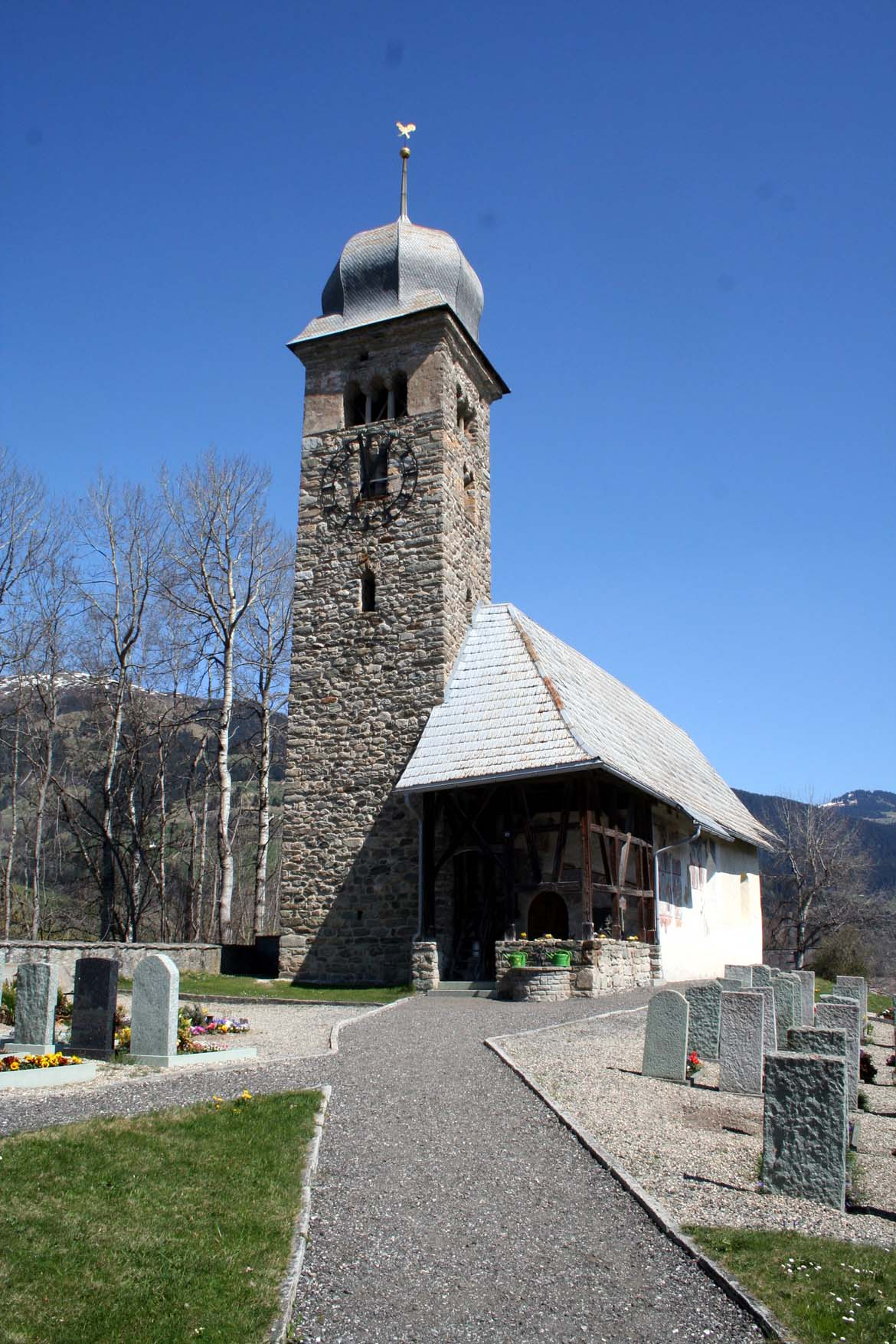
Exterior of the church

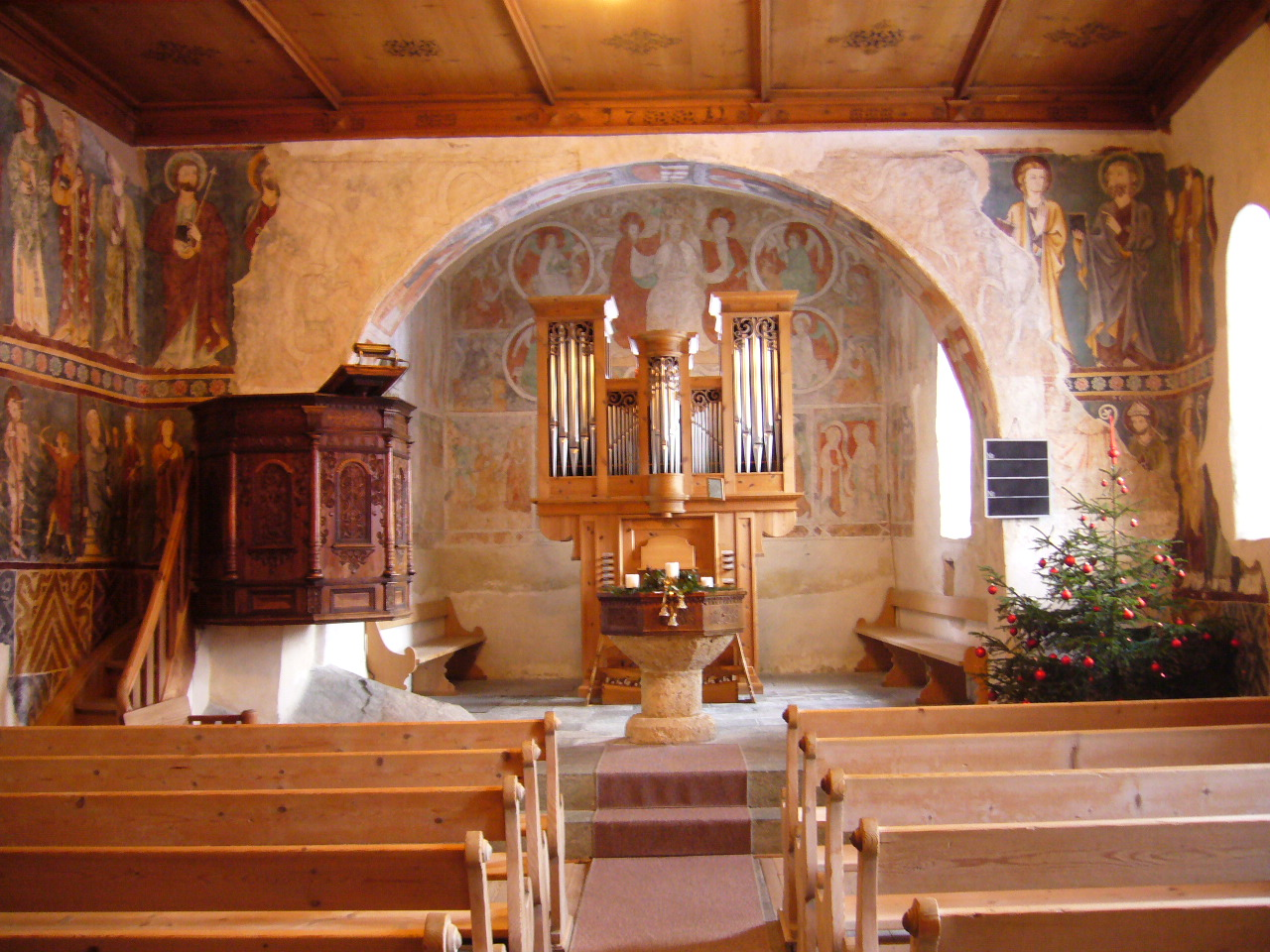
Interior of the Church of Waltensburg

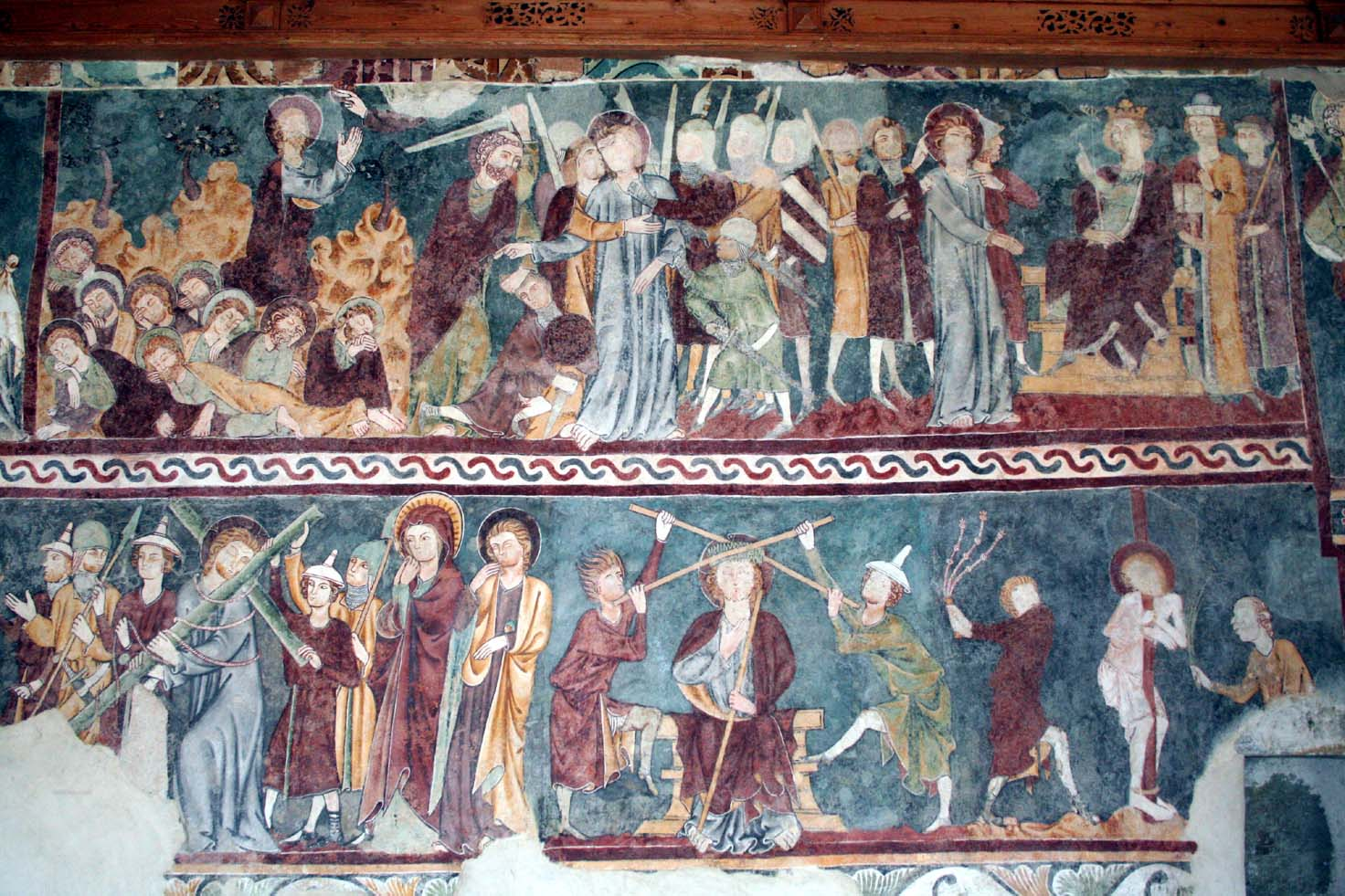
Fresco of the Stations of the Cross

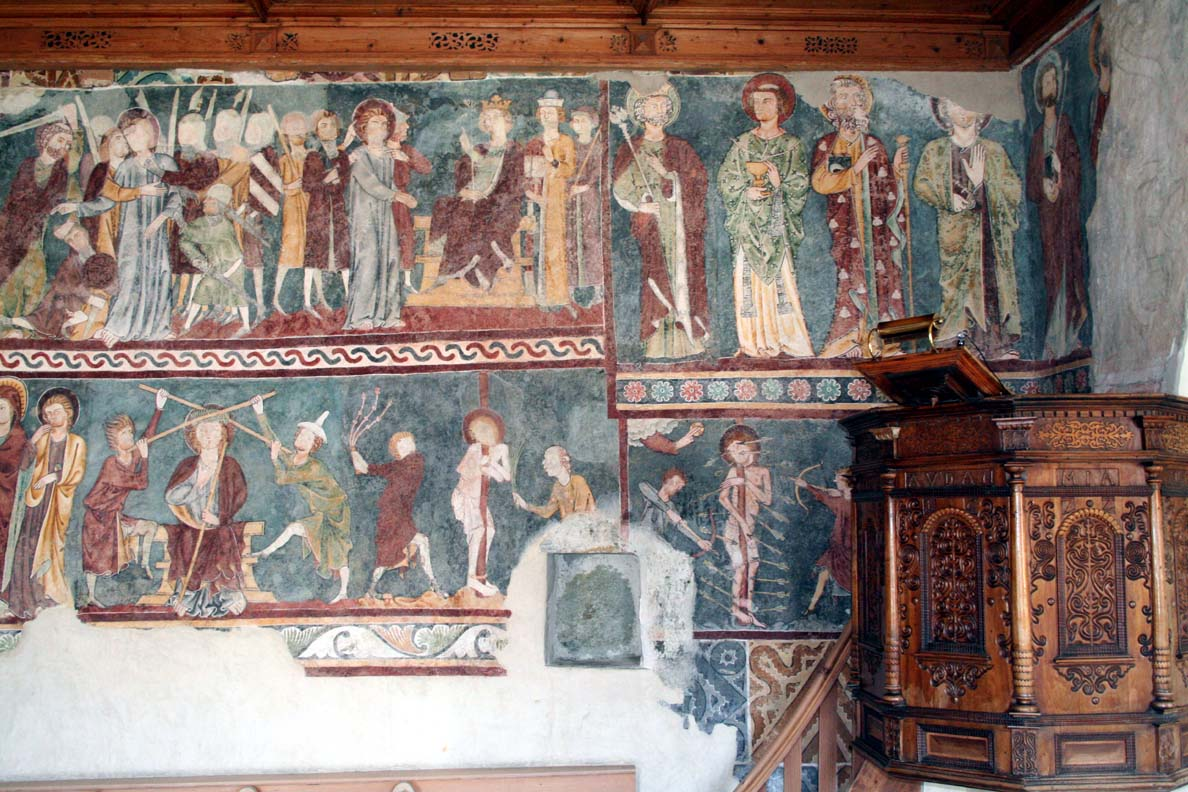
Frescoes, including the scourging of Christ

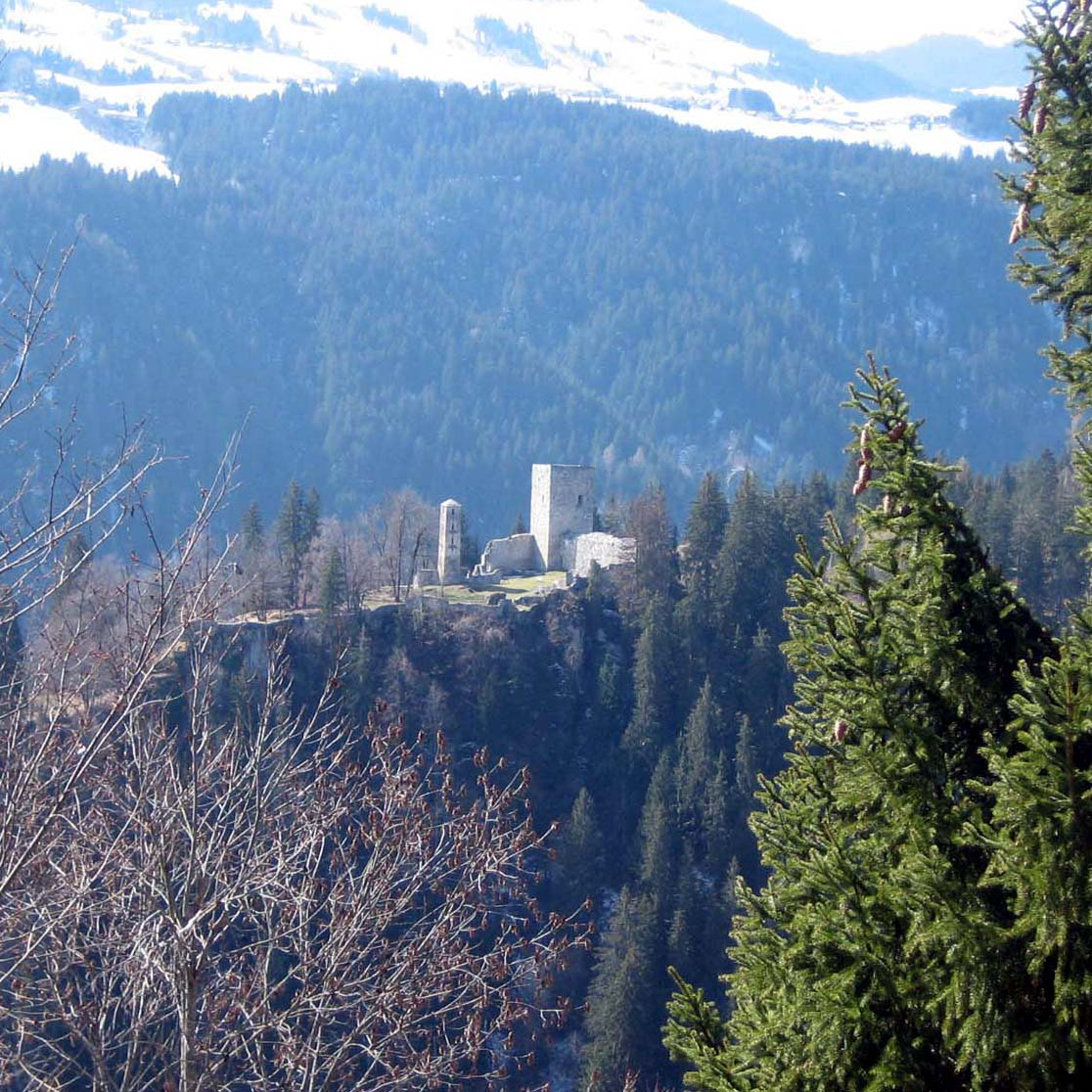
Burg Jörgenberg

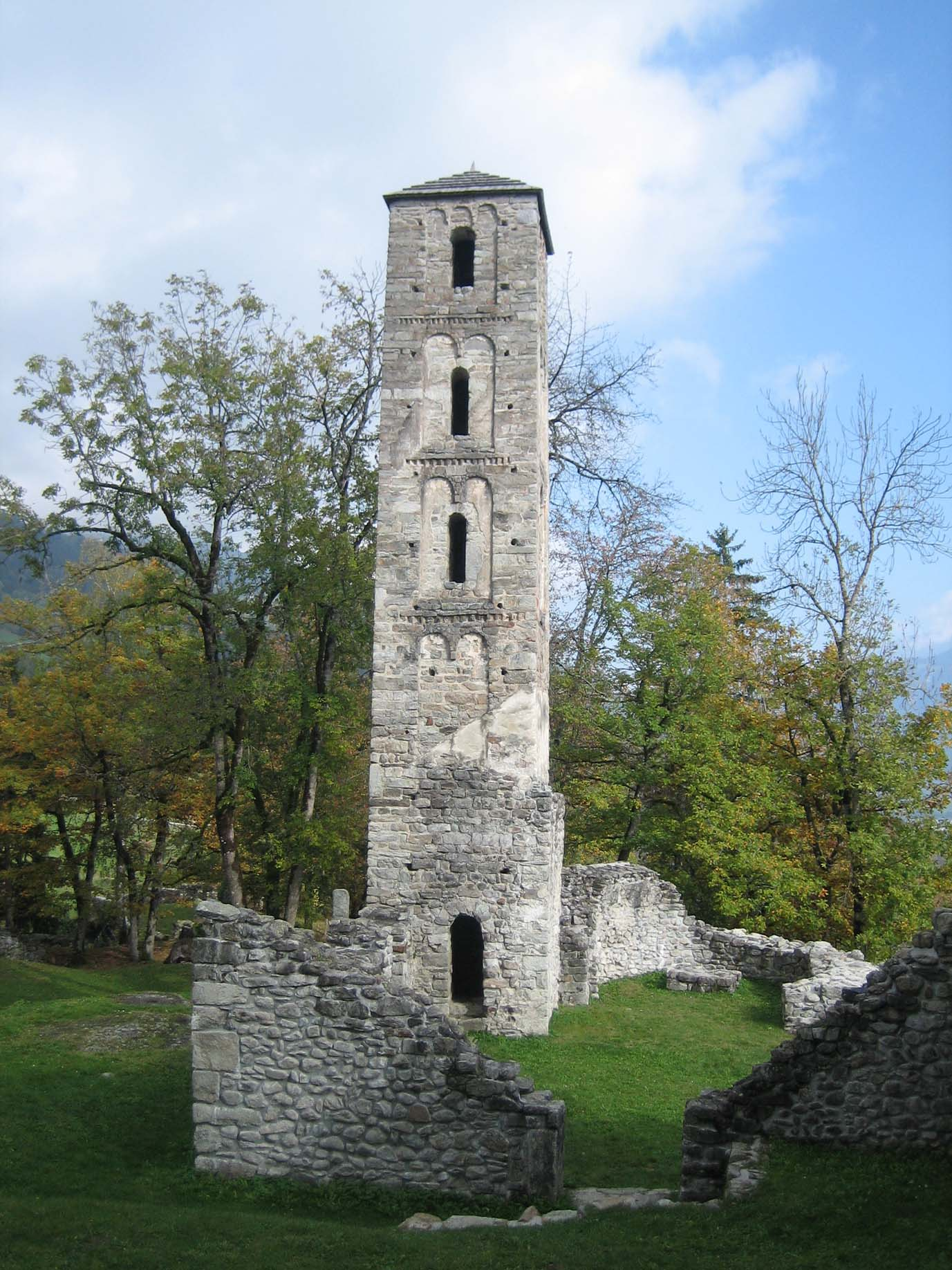
Jörgenberg Bell Tower

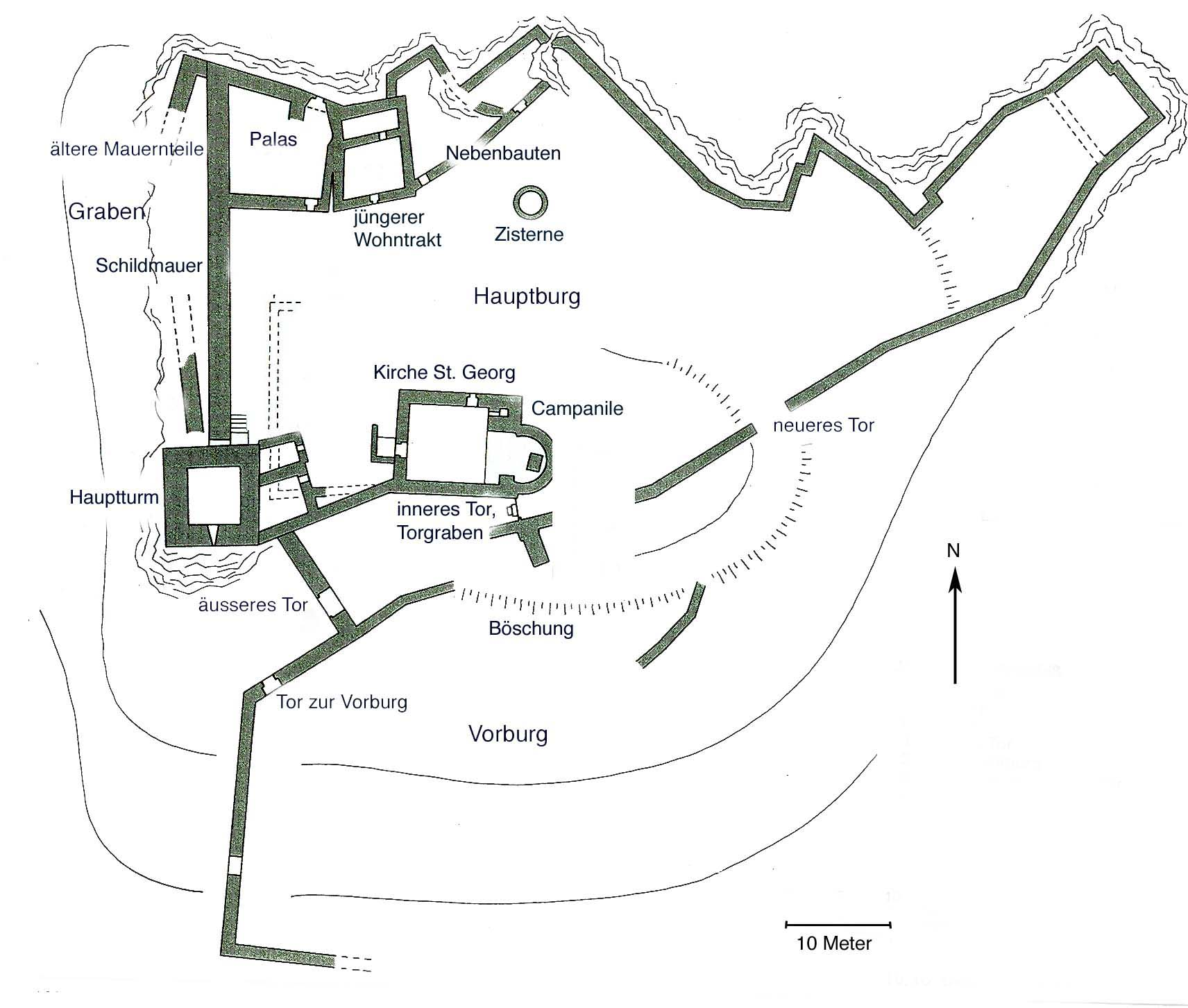
Jörgenberg floor plan

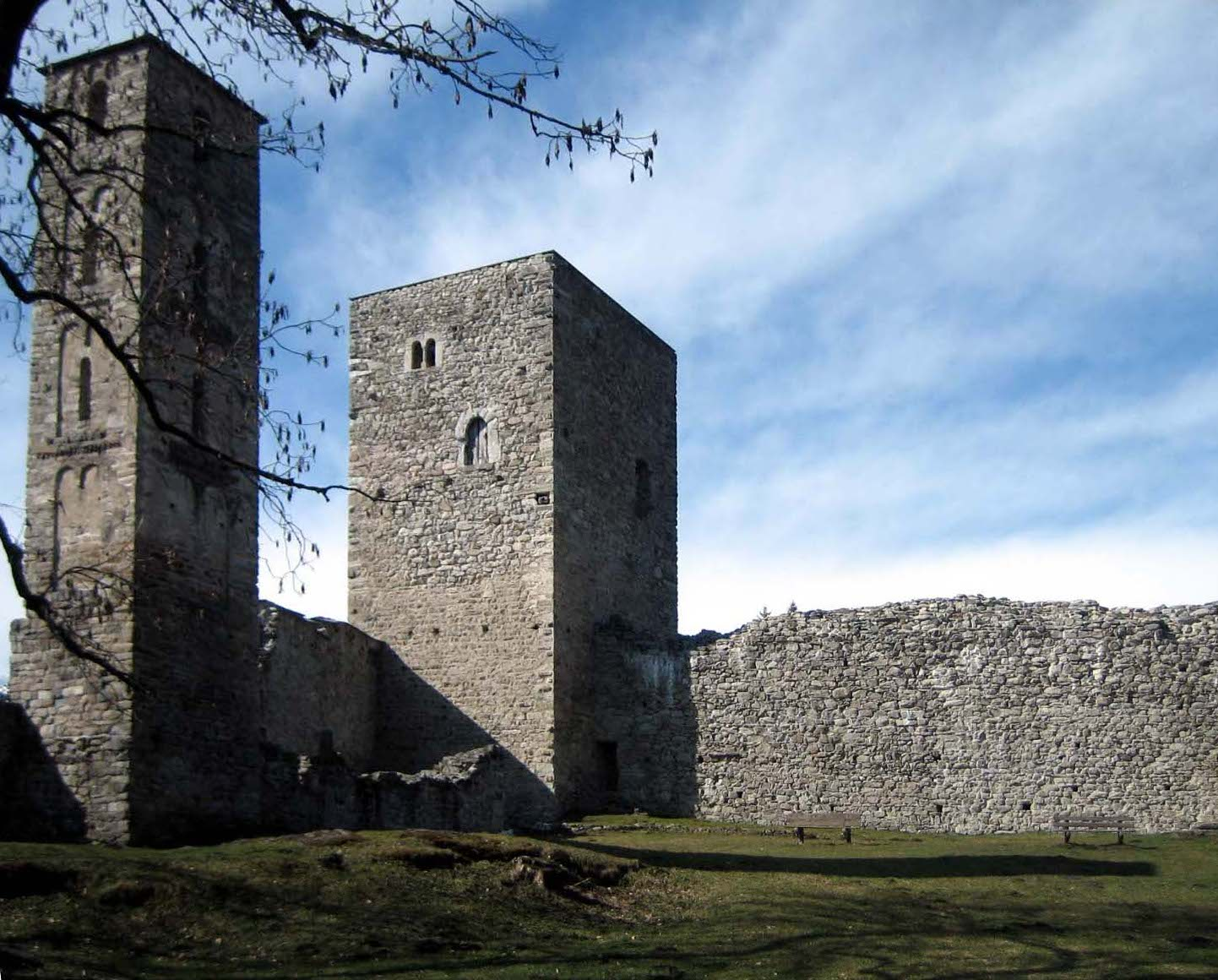
Inner courtyard of Jörgenberg

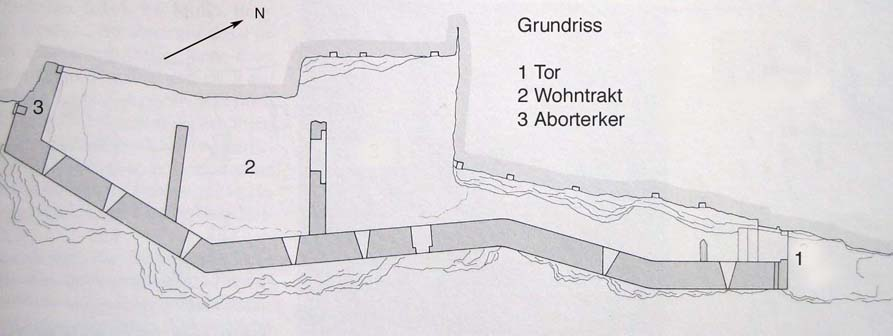
Kropfenstein Castle floor plan

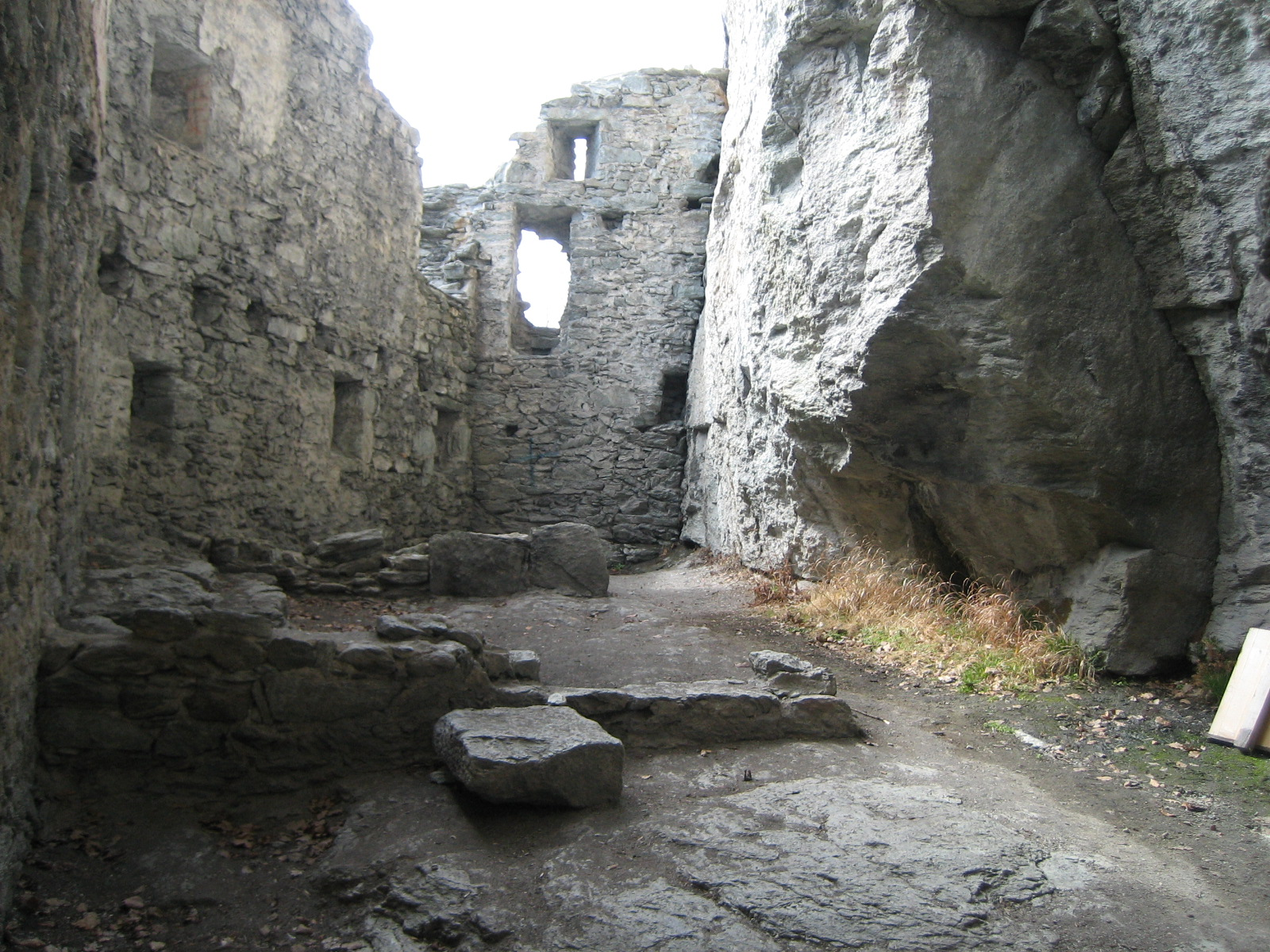
Interior of Kropfenstein

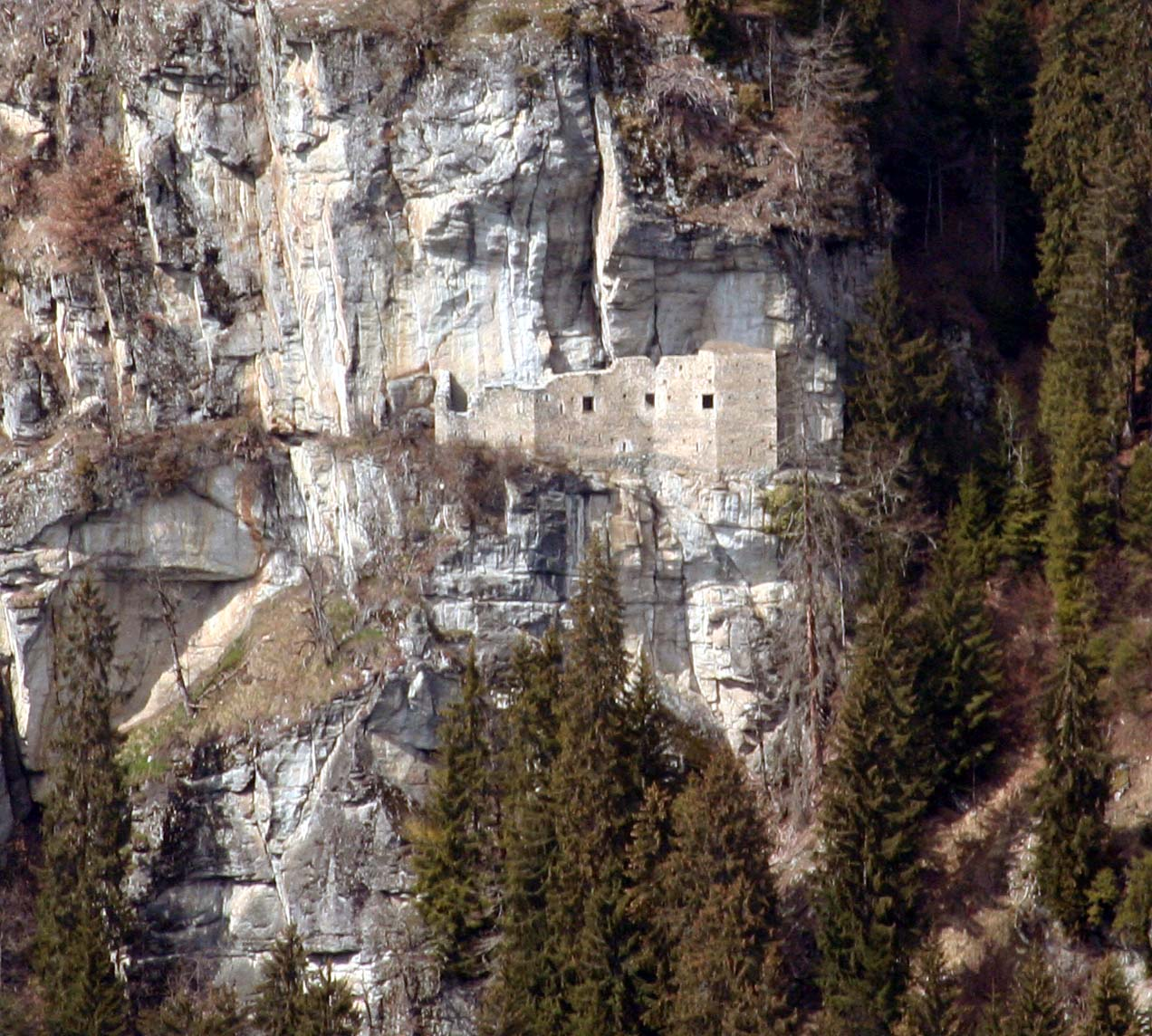
Kropfenstein site

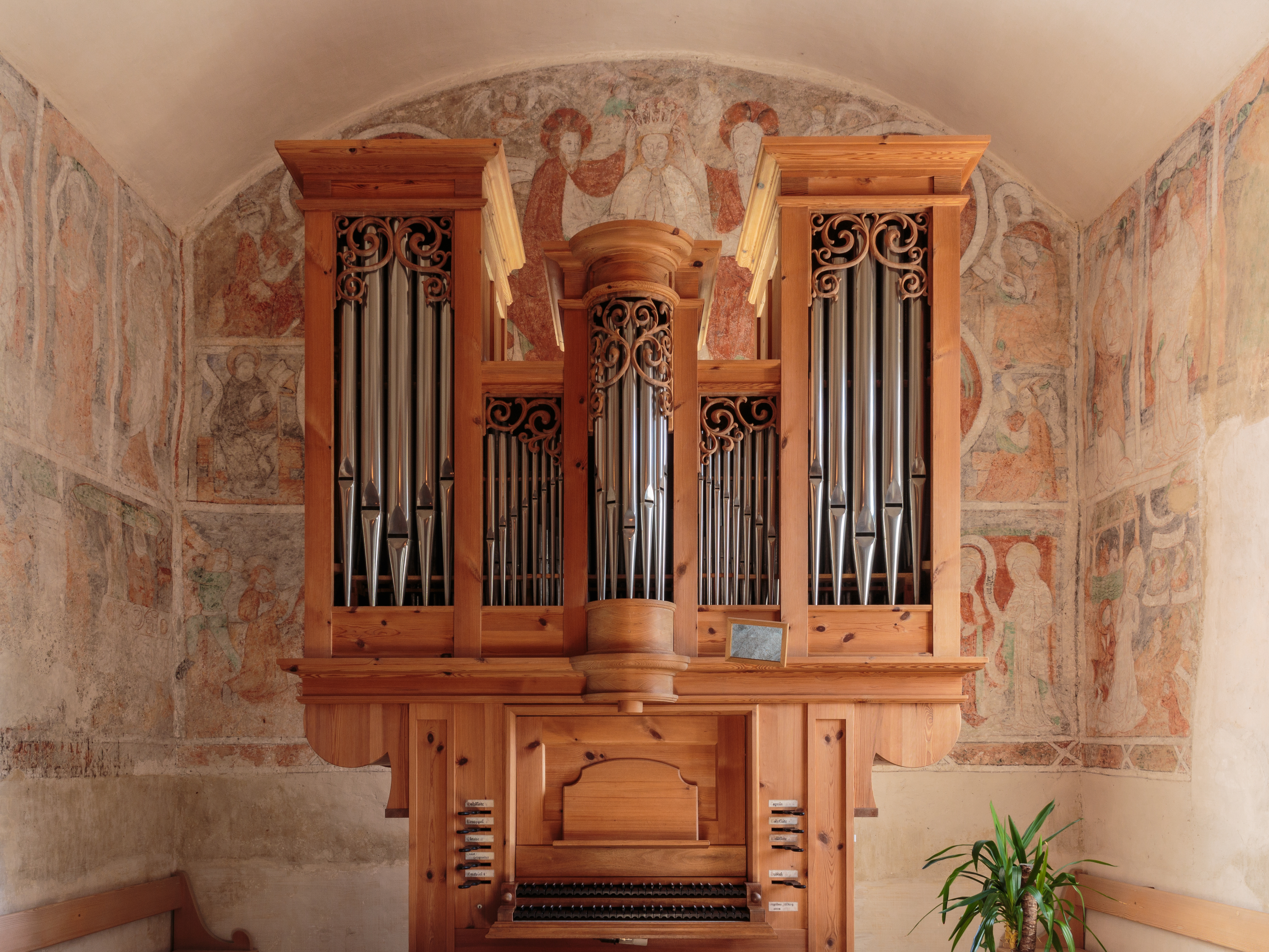
Church Organ

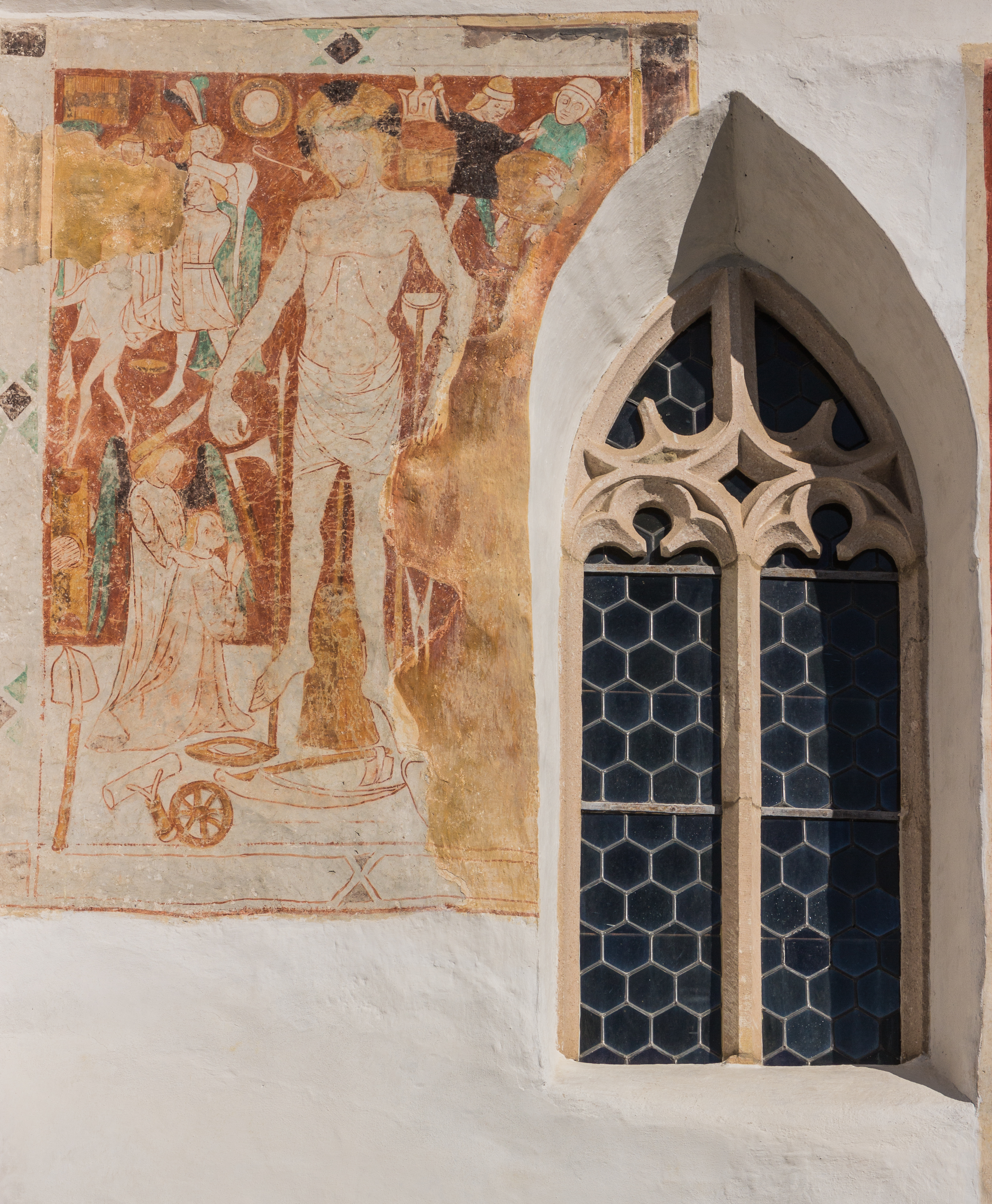
Fresco and window on the church

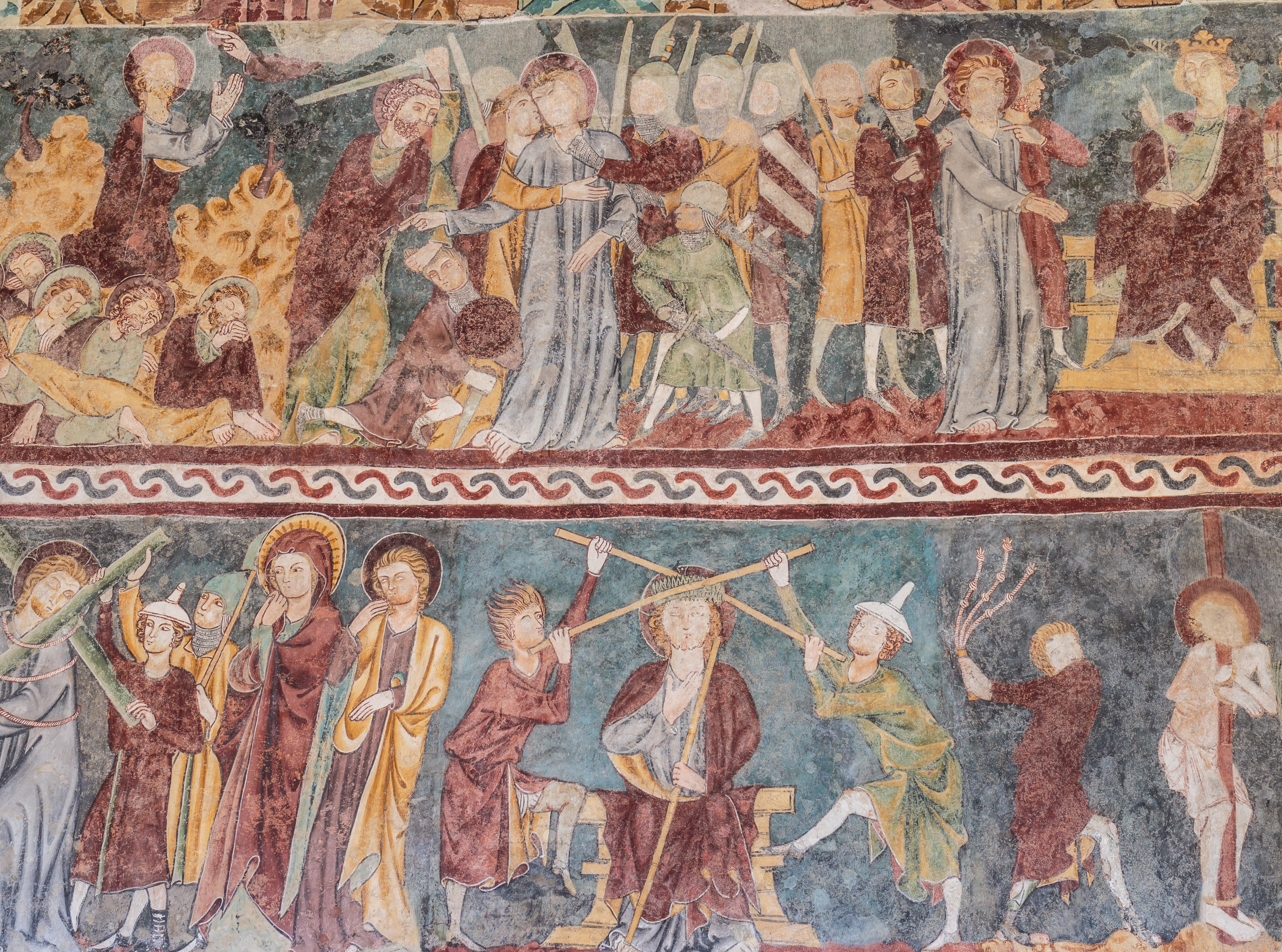
Fresco

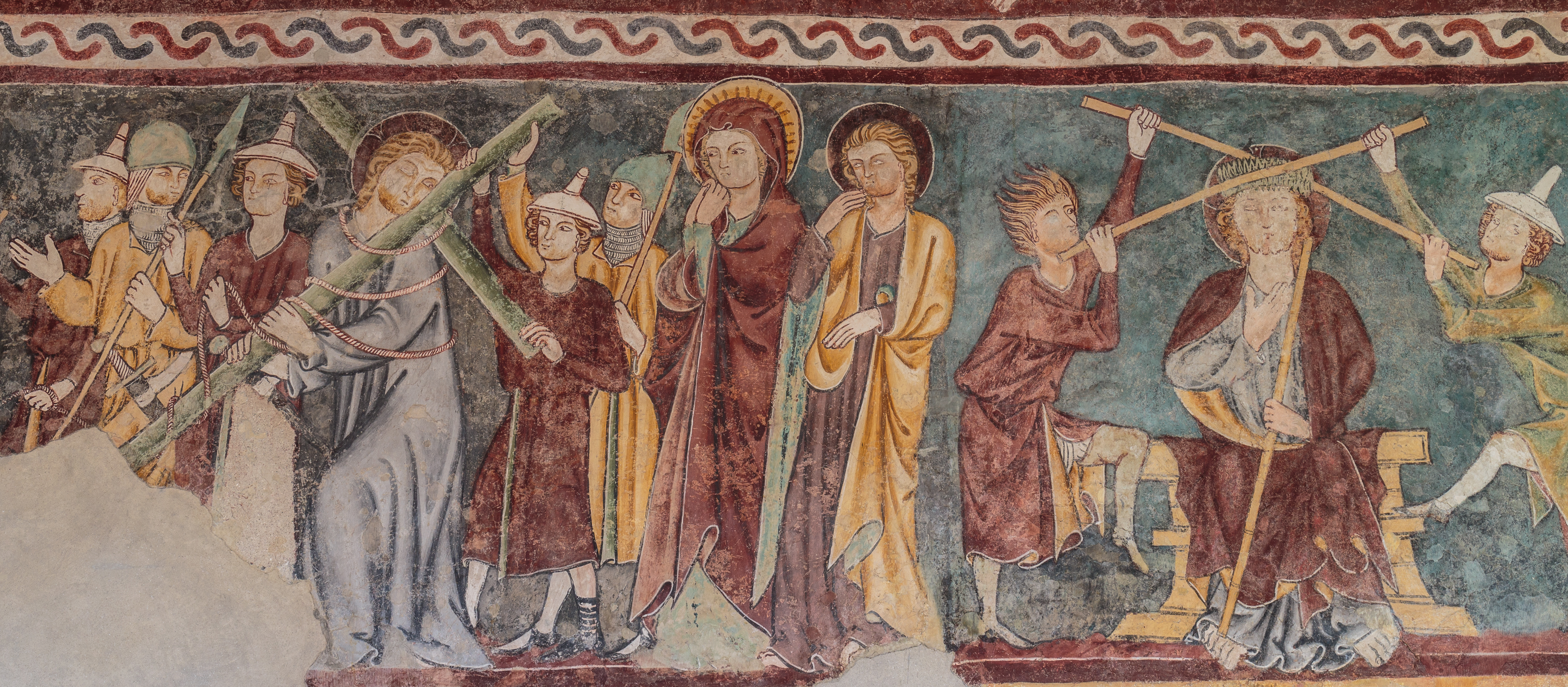
Fresco

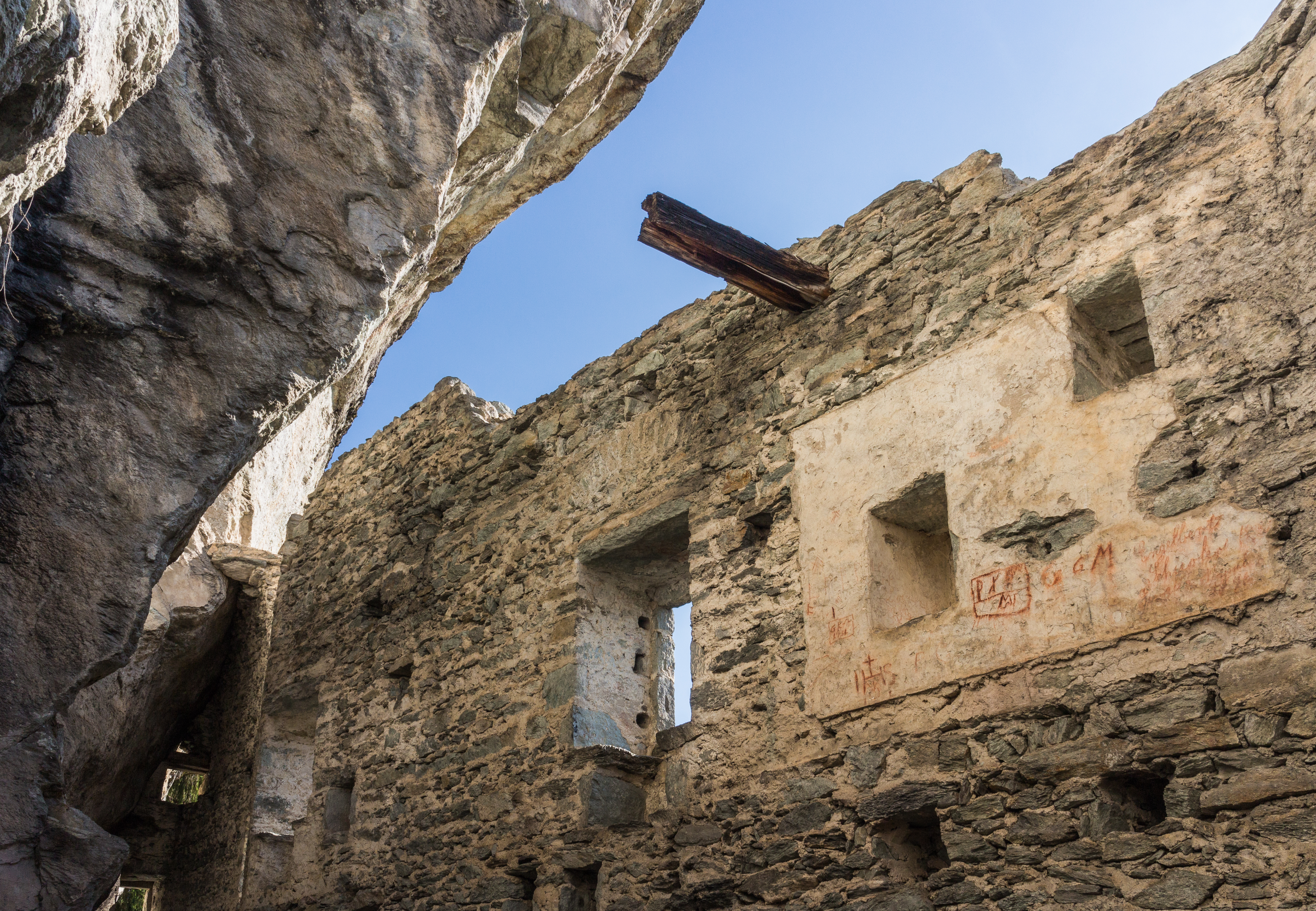
Ruins of Kropfenstein Castle

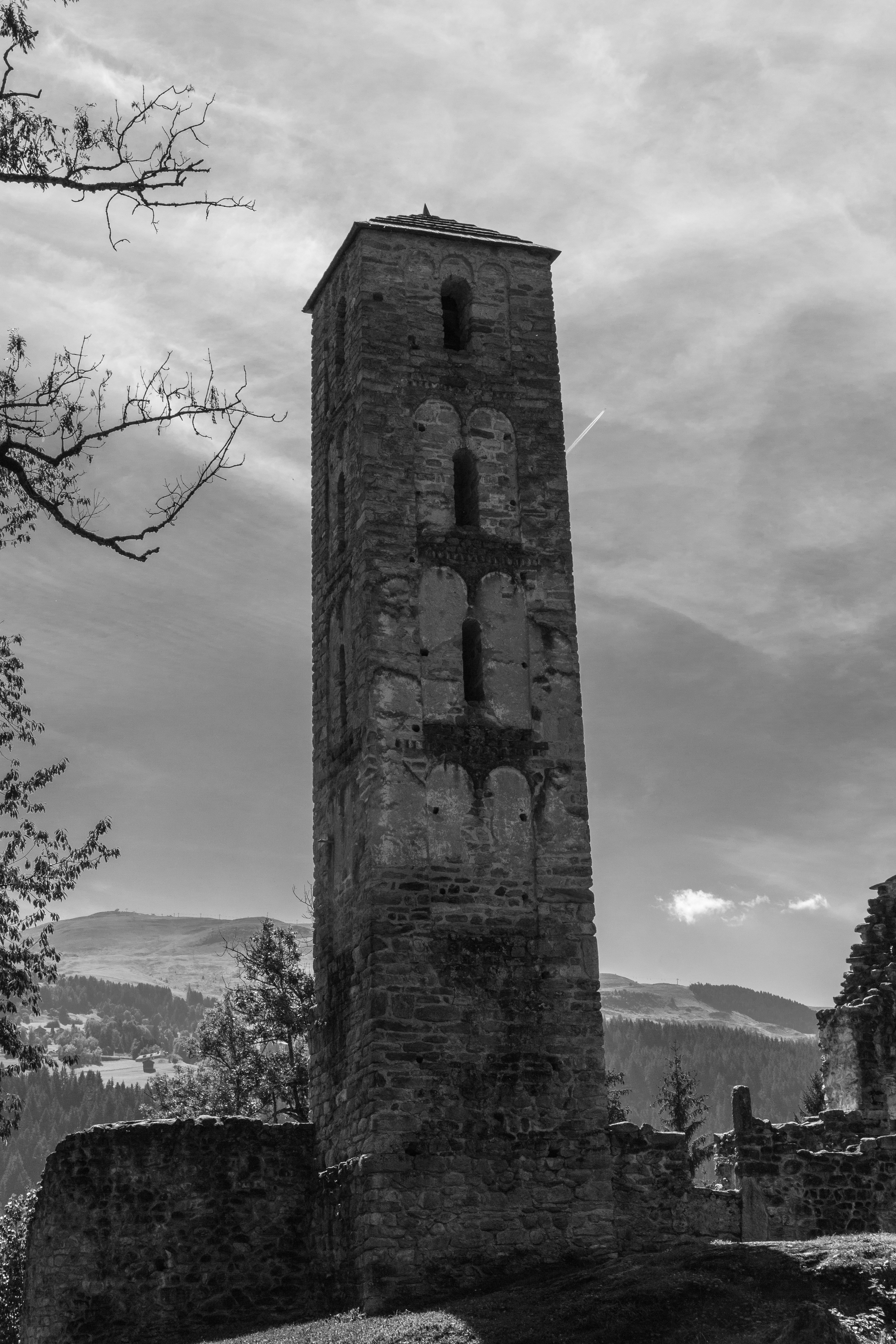
Toren bij de ruïne.

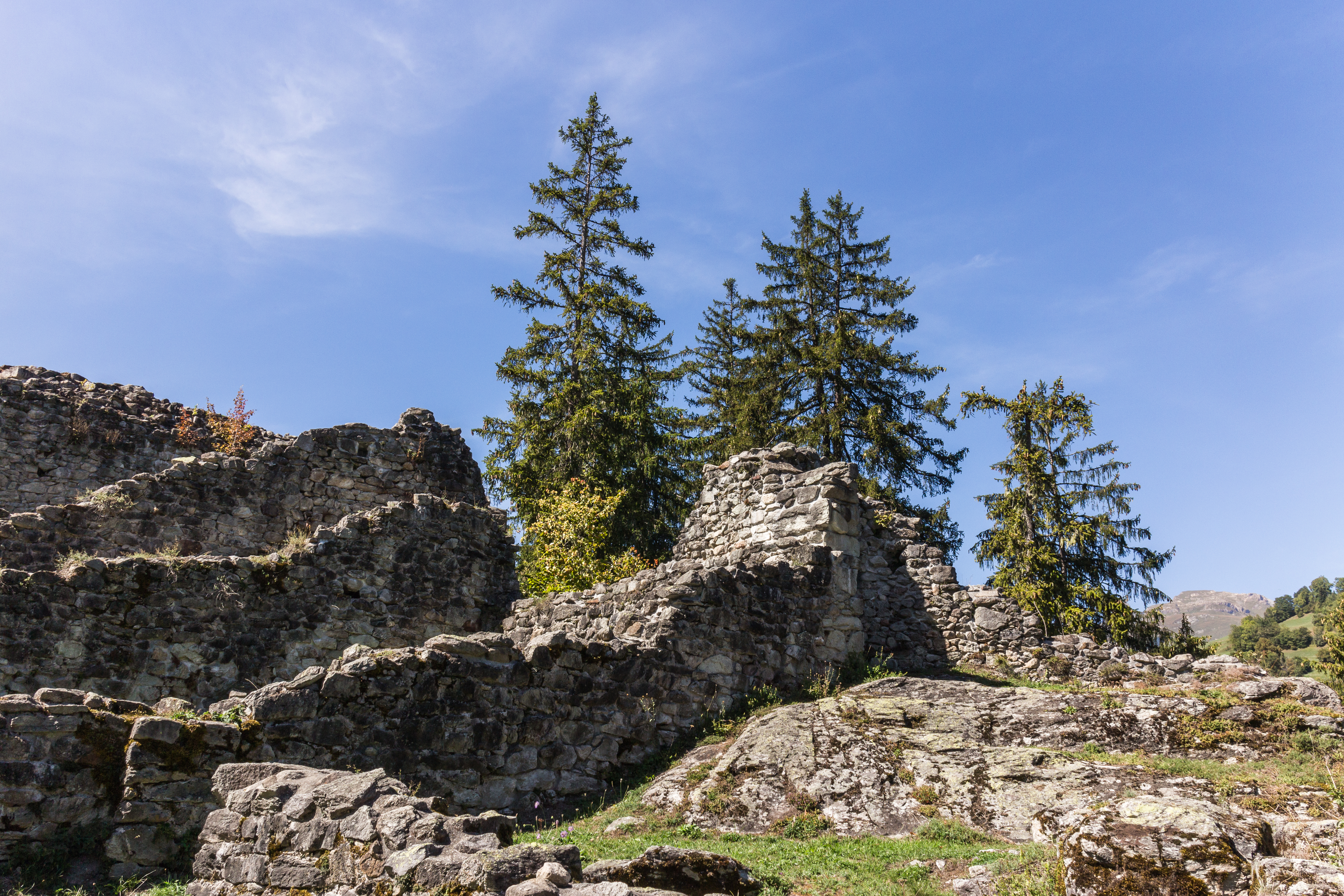
Restanten van de ruïne.

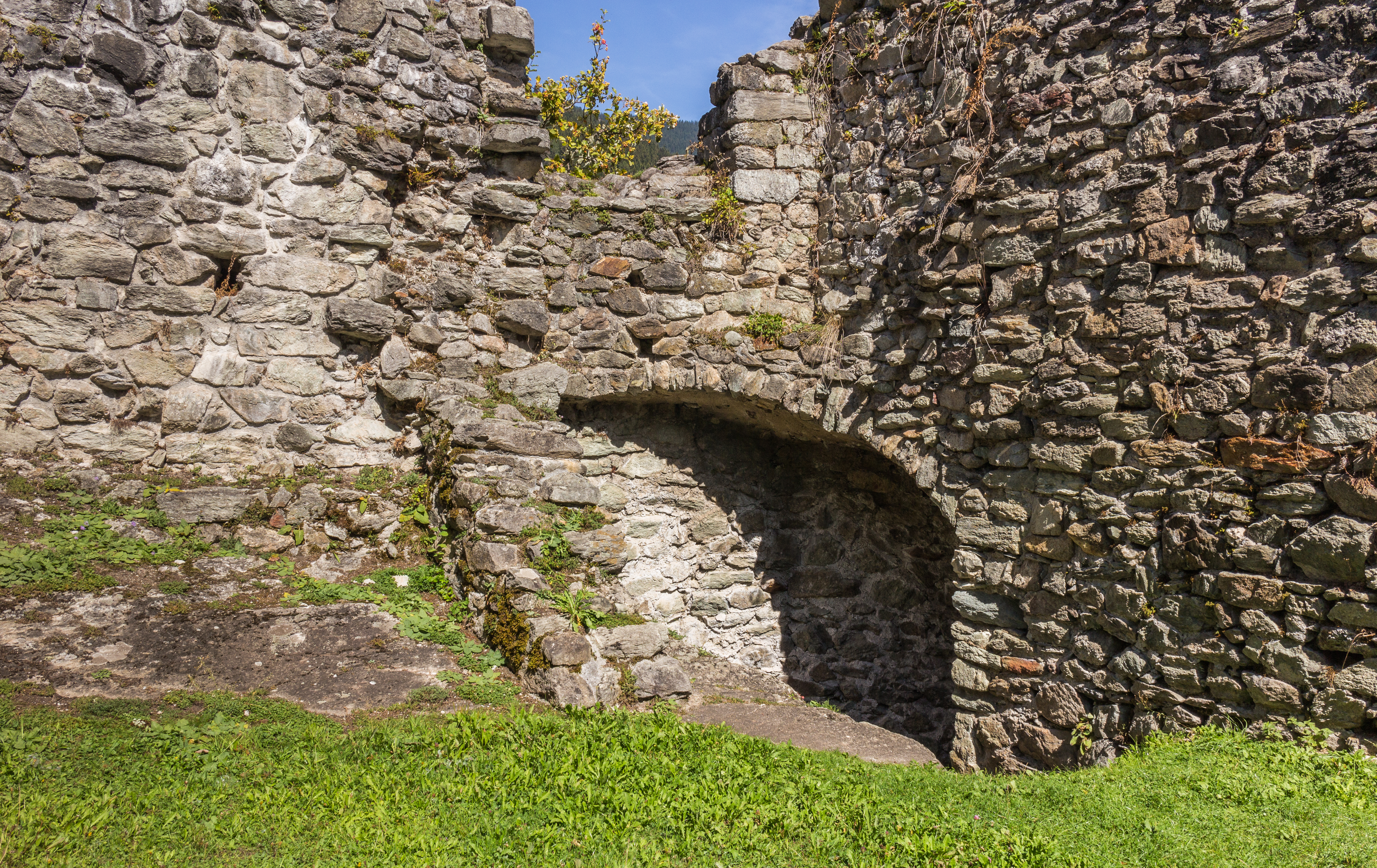
Restanten van de ruïne.

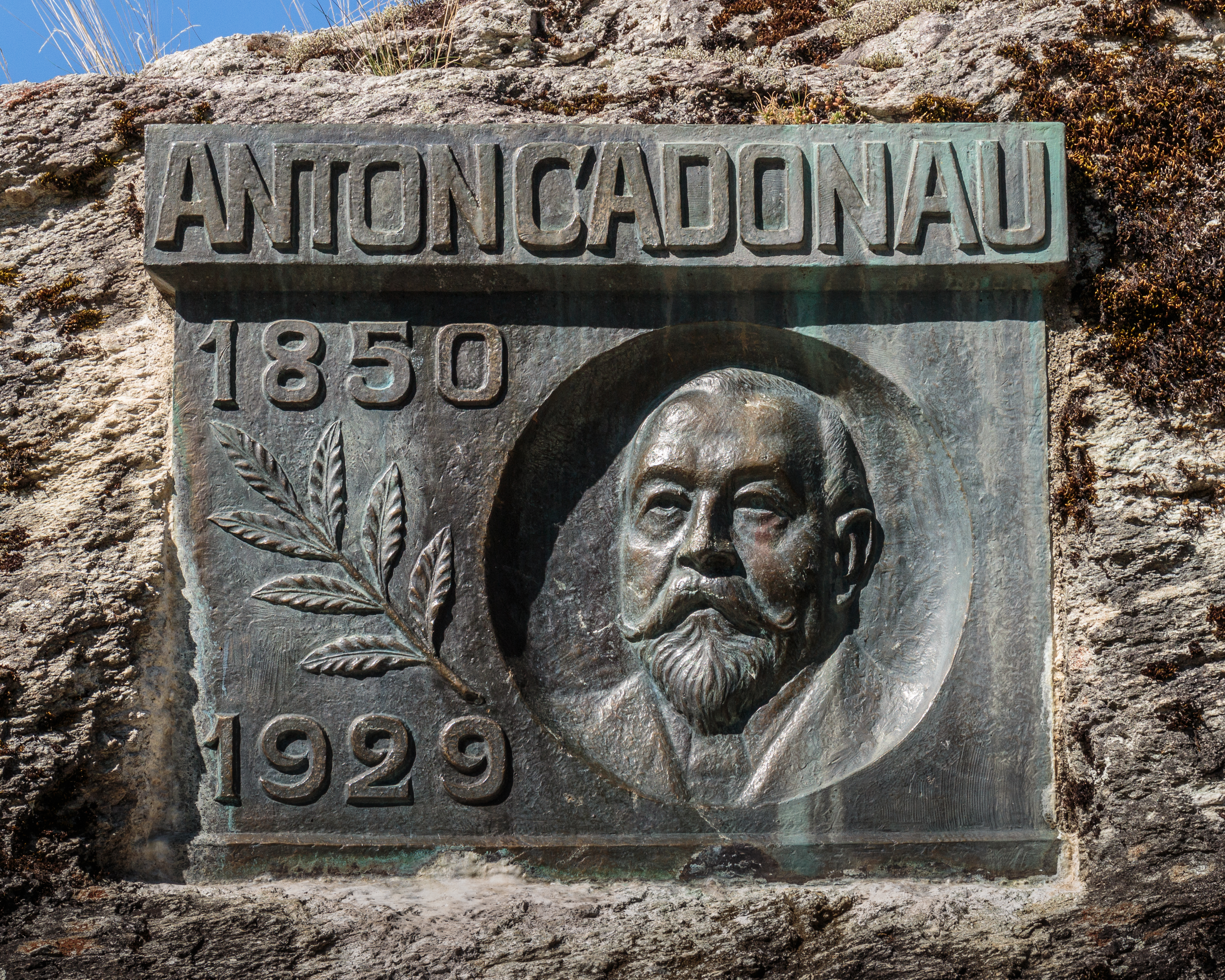
herinneringssteen.
