= Kropfenstein Castle =

Cave castle in Switzerland

- Burg Kropfenstein
- Waltensburg/Vuorz
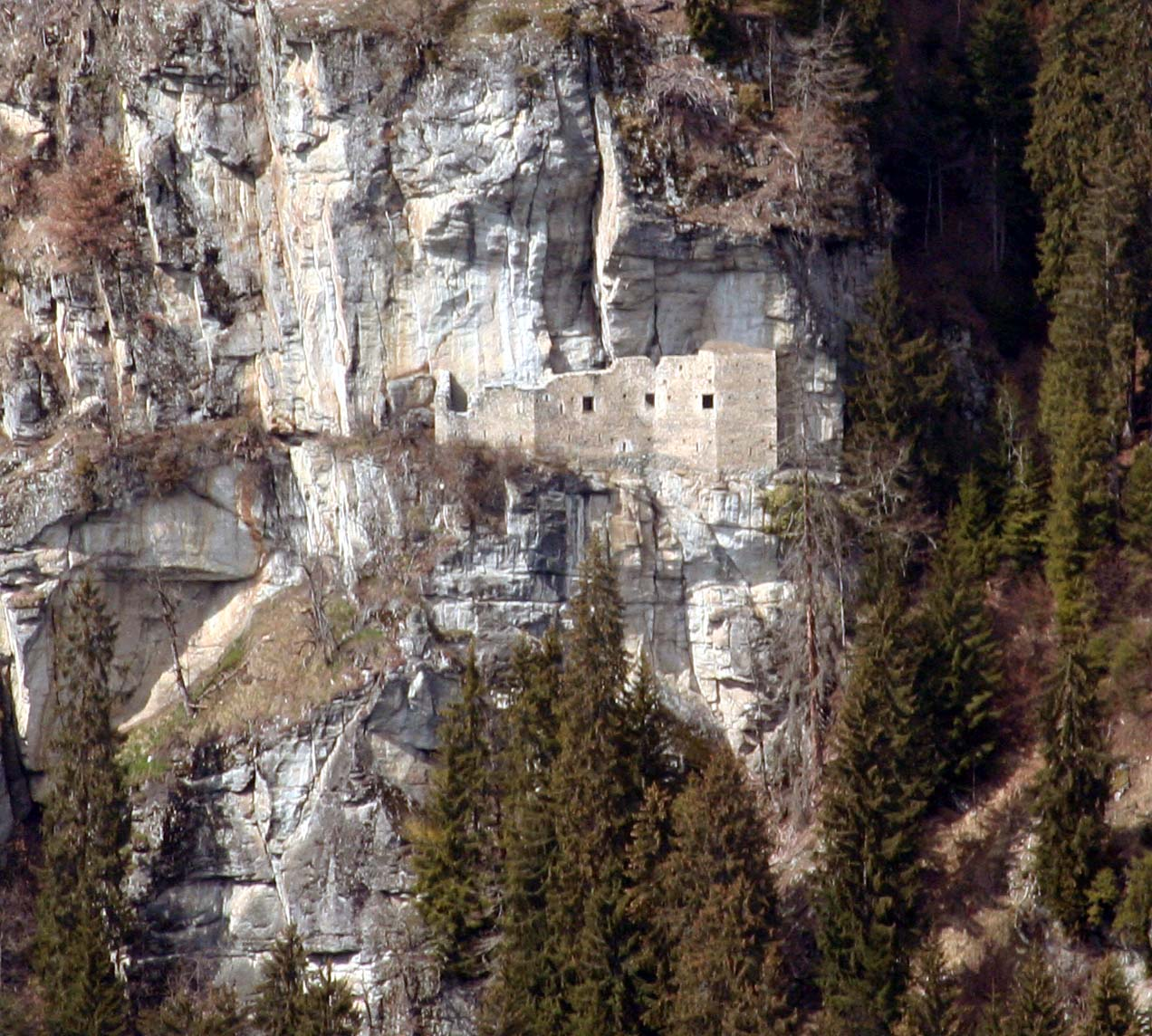
- Kropfenstein Castle

Site information
- Open to the public: yes

Location
- Coordinates: 46.769868°N 9.101305°E

Site history
- Built: 13th century
- Materials: Stone

Kropfenstein Castle is a cave castle in the municipality of Waltensburg/Vuorz of the Canton of Graubünden in Switzerland. It is a Swiss heritage site of national significance.

== History ==
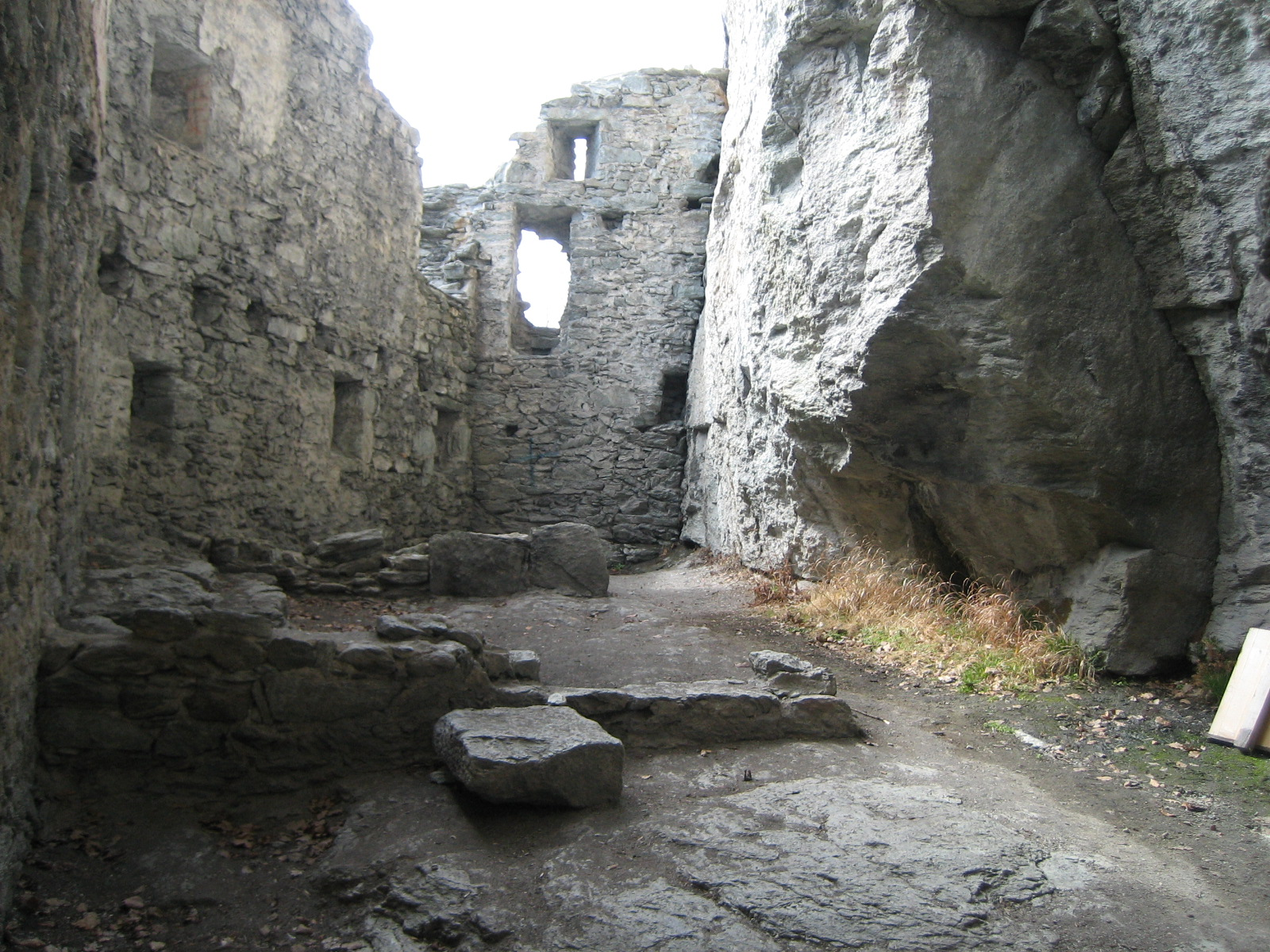
Interior of Kropfenstein Castle

There are no surviving records indicating when or how this castle was built. From the style of construction it appears to have been built in the 13th century and was in operation until the 15th century. By the 14th century the Counts of Kropfenstein begin to appear in historical records. They appear to have adopted the castle's name when they took up residence there. In addition to the area around the castle, the Counts had close relations with the Herrschaft of Rhäzüns. The Kropfenstein line died out in the 15th century and the castle began to fall into disrepair.

== Castle site ==
The castle is reached through a path that was cut into the rock on the east side. Eventually a parapet was built along the path to prevent falls.

The castle walls follow the edge of the cliff making its shape very irregular. Due to the overhanging rock wall, the castle remains in generally good condition with limited weathering. The castle was three stories tall with embrasures that are still visible on the upper two stories. The exact floor plan of the castle is unknown but it was probably divided into several rooms. The first room is only about 2 m (6.6 ft) wide and was probably used as a store room. The western part of the castle is up to 6 m (20 ft) wide and contained the castle living quarters and kitchen. Nothing is known about the castle roof, but it may have been just a canopy to keep rain out.

== See also ==
- List of castles in Switzerland
