= Ilanz (Kreis) =

Coordinates: 46.7651°N 9.2°E

Ilanz was a Kreis of the Surselva district, in the canton of Graubünden (French: Grisons), Switzerland.

== Communes ==
Ilanz contained the following communes, or municipalities:

- Castrisch
- Falera
- Flond
- Ilanz
- Laax
- Ladir
- Luven
- Pitasch
- Riein
- Ruschein
- Sagogn
- Schluein
- Schnaus
- Sevgein
- Valendas
- Versam
