= Crap Masegn =

Mountain in Switzerland

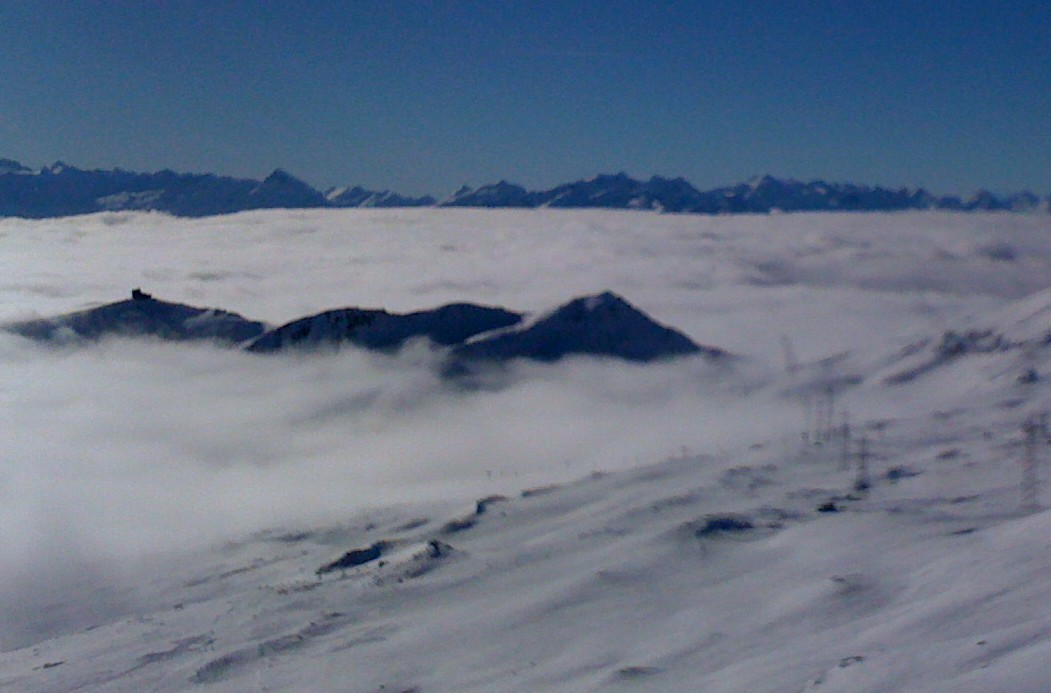
- Crap Masegn seen from north; peak to the right of the station called Crap Masegn.

Highest point
- Elevation: 2,516 m (8,255 ft)
- Prominence: 133 m (436 ft)
- Coordinates: 46°51′01.3″N 9°10′16″E

Geography
- Location within Switzerland
- Location: Graubünden, Switzerland
- Parent range: Glarus Alps

Climbing
- Easiest route: Aerial tramway

The Crap Masegn is a mountain of the Glarus Alps, located near Flims in the canton of Graubünden, Switzerland. It lies south of the Vorab.

Territorially it divides on the municipal areas of Falera on its eastern face, a narrow southern stripe of Ladir and Ruschein on its western face.

There is a station of an aerial cableway of the same name which is nowhere near this peak but one kilometer southeast, on the nameless junction of the two ridges of Crest Da Tiarms and Crest La Siala. There is a chairlift and a gondola lift ending there as well, all of them belonging to the skiing resort of Flims-Laax-Falera which uses the name of Laax only for winter marketing.

== See also ==
- List of mountains of Switzerland accessible by public transport
