= Duvin =

- Former municipality
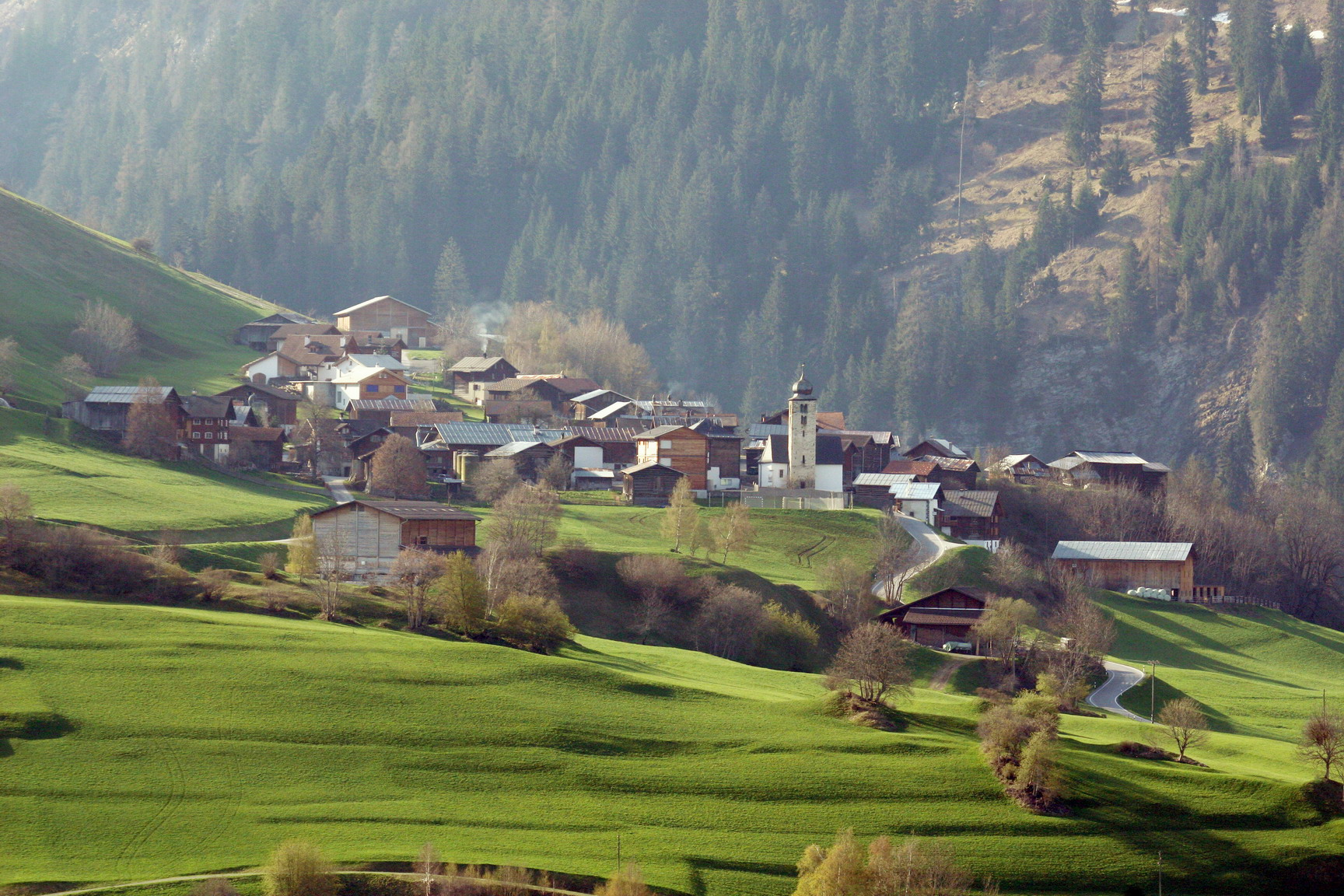

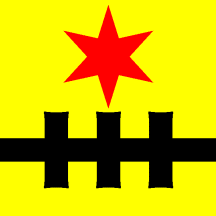
- Flag Coat of arms
- Location of Duvin
- Location within Switzerland Location within Canton of Graubünden
- Coordinates: 46°43′N 9°13′E
- Country: Switzerland
- Canton: Graubünden
- District: Surselva

Government
  - Mayor: Hans Müller

Area
  - Total: 17.93 km^{2} (6.92 sq mi)
- Elevation: 1,180 m (3,870 ft)

Population (Dec 2011)
  - Total: 84
  - Density: 4.7/km^{2} (12/sq mi)
- Time zone: UTC+01:00 (CET)
  - Summer (DST): UTC+02:00 (CEST)
- Postal code: 7112
- SFOS number: 3593
- ISO 3166 code: CH-GR
- Surrounded by: Cumbel, Pitasch, Riein, Safien, Sankt Martin, Suraua
- Website: www.duvin.ch

Duvin (German: Duvin [duˈvin]), Romansh: Duin [duɪ̯n]) is a former municipality in the district of Surselva in the Swiss canton of Graubünden. On 1 January 2014 the former municipalities of Duvin, Castrisch, Ilanz, Ladir, Luven, Pitasch, Riein, Ruschein, Schnaus, Sevgein, Pigniu, Rueun and Siat merged into the new municipality of Ilanz/Glion.

== History ==
Duvin is first mentioned about 840 as Auna. In 1290 it was mentioned as Aiuns.

== Geography ==
Aerial view from 4000 m by Walter Mittelholzer (1919)

Before the merger, Duvin had a total area of 17.9 km^{2} (6.9 mi^{2}). Of this area, 22% is used for agricultural purposes, while 40% is forested. Of the rest of the land, 1% is settled (buildings or roads) and the remainder (37%) is non-productive (rivers, glaciers or mountains).

The former municipality is located in the Lugnez sub-district of the Surselva district. It is on a terrace above the right side of the Lugnez valley. It is separated from Camuns (a village in Suraua) and Pitasch by deep canyons.

== Demographics ==
Duvin had a population (as of 2011) of 84. As of 2008, 1.1% of the population was made up of foreign nationals. Over the last 10 years the population has grown at a rate of 6.8%. Most of the population (as of 2000) speaks Romansh(48.8%), with German being second most common (47.5%) and Italian being third ( 2.5%).

As of 2000, the gender distribution of the population was 47.9% male and 52.1% female. The age distribution, as of 2000, in Duvin is; 9 children or 11.3% of the population are between 0 and 9 years old and 15 teenagers or 18.8% are between 10 and 19. Of the adult population, 6 people or 7.5% of the population are between 20 and 29 years old. 16 people or 20.0% are between 30 and 39, 13 people or 16.3% are between 40 and 49, and 8 people or 10.0% are between 50 and 59. The senior population distribution is 9 people or 11.3% of the population are between 60 and 69 years old, no one is between 70 and 79, while there are 2 people or 2.5% who are between 80 and 89 and there are 2 people or 2.5% who are between 90 and 99.

In the 2007 federal election the most popular party was the SVP which received 74.2% of the vote. The next two most popular parties were the SP (12.5%) and the FDP (6.7%).

About 69.6% of Duvin's population (between age 25-64) have completed either non-mandatory upper secondary education or additional higher education (either university or a Fachhochschule).

Duvin has an unemployment rate of 0%. As of 2005, there were 24 people employed in the primary economic sector and about 10 businesses involved in this sector. People are employed in the secondary sector and there are businesses in this sector. people are employed in the tertiary sector, with businesses in this sector.

== Dunvin route ==
"Duvin" or "Dun vin" is a route in the Lavaux region in the canton of Vaud in Switzerland. It was developed mostly by monks about 800 years ago. The vineyards of Lavaux can be traced back to the 11th century.
