= Rueun =

- Former municipality
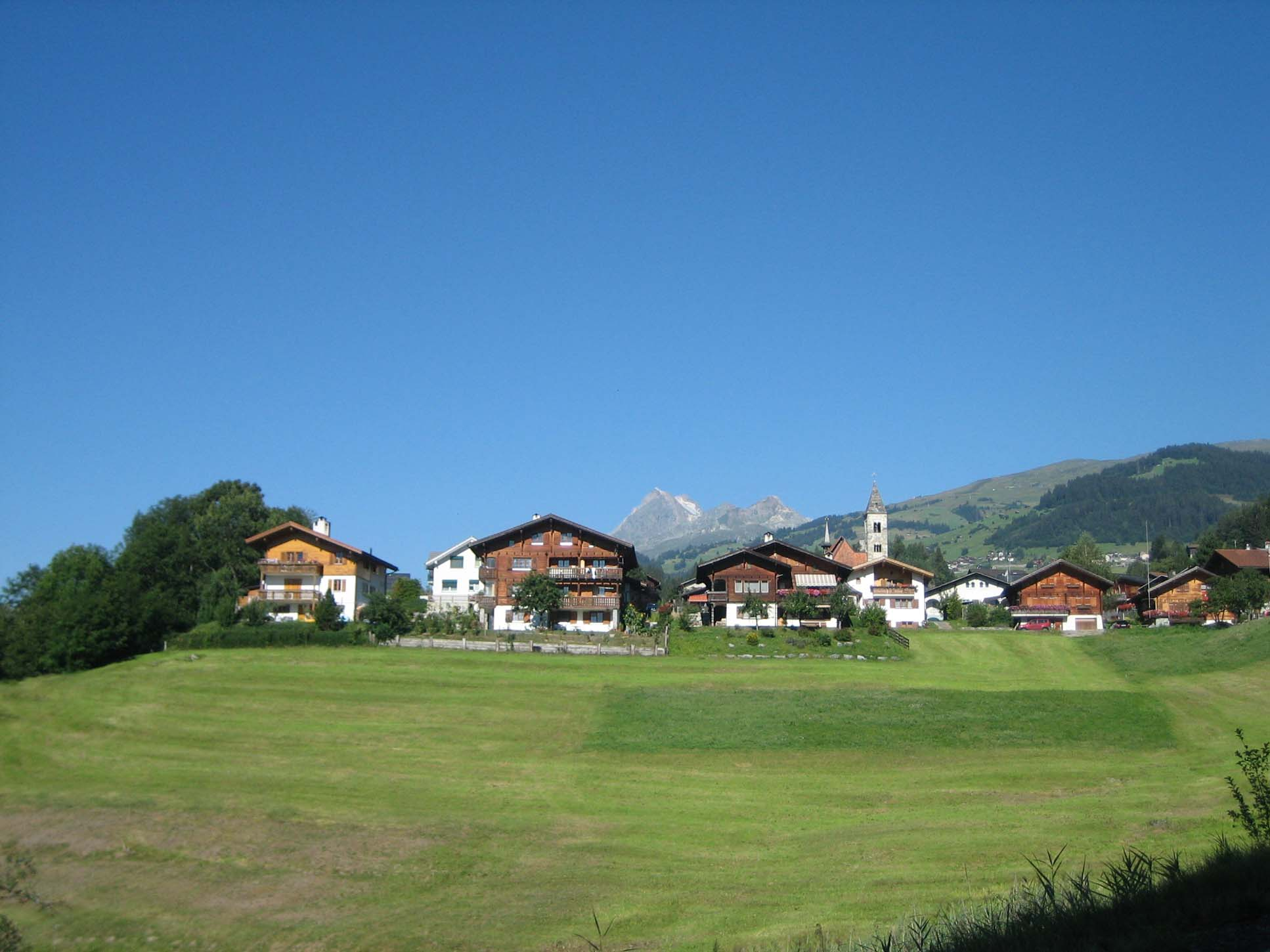

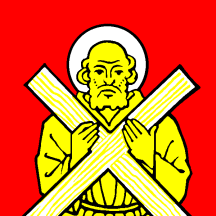
- Flag Coat of arms
- Location of Rueun
- Location within Switzerland Location within Canton of Graubünden
- Coordinates: 46°46.7′N 9°9′E
- Country: Switzerland
- Canton: Graubünden
- District: Surselva

Area
  - Total: 11.58 km^{2} (4.47 sq mi)
- Elevation: 788 m (2,585 ft)

Population (Dec 2011)
  - Total: 414
  - Density: 35.8/km^{2} (92.6/sq mi)
- Time zone: UTC+01:00 (CET)
  - Summer (DST): UTC+02:00 (CEST)
- Postal code: 7156
- SFOS number: 3614
- ISO 3166 code: CH-GR
- Surrounded by: Andiast, Flond, Ilanz, Obersaxen, Pigniu, Schnaus, Siat, Waltensburg/Vuorz
- Website: www.rueun.ch

Rueun is a former municipality in the district of Surselva in the canton of Graubünden in Switzerland. On 1 January 2014 the former municipalities of Rueun, Castrisch, Ilanz, Ladir, Luven, Pitasch, Riein, Ruschein, Schnaus, Sevgein, Duvin, Pigniu and Siat merged into the new municipality of Ilanz/Glion.

== History ==
Rueun is first mentioned in 765 as Ruane. Until 1943 Rueun was known as Ruis.

== Coat of arms ==
The blazon of the municipal coat of arms is Gules St. Andrew issuant holding a wooden saltire cross. The motif of St. Andrew comes from the local Church of St. Andrew, which was under the authority of Disentis Abbey.

== Geography ==
Aerial view (1957)

Before the merger, Rueun had a total area of 11.6 km^{2} (4.5 mi^{2}). Of this area, 46% is used for agricultural purposes, while 43.7% is forested. Of the rest of the land, 4.4% is settled (buildings or roads) and the remainder (5.9%) is non-productive (rivers, glaciers or mountains).

The former municipality is located in the Ruis sub-district of the Surselva district. It is located in the Vorderrhein valley.

== Demographics ==
Rueun had a population (as of 2011) of 414. As of 2011, 8.7% of the population was made up of foreign nationals. Between 2000 and 2010, the population has decreased with 10%. Most of the population (as of 2000) speaks Romansh (72.0%), with German being second most common (14.3%) and Italian being third (3.0%).

As of 2000, the gender distribution of the population was 48.9% male and 51.1% female. The age distribution, as of 2000, in Rueun is; 67 children or 14.6% of the population are between 0 and 9 years old and 52 teenagers or 11.3% are between 10 and 19. Of the adult population, 44 people or 9.6% of the population are between 20 and 29 years old. 88 people or 19.1% are between 30 and 39, 69 people or 15.0% are between 40 and 49, and 34 people or 7.4% are between 50 and 59. The senior population distribution is 43 people or 9.3% of the population are between 60 and 69 years old, 36 people or 7.8% are between 70 and 79, there are 23 people or 5.0% who are between 80 and 89, and there are 4 people or 0.9% who are between 90 and 99.

In the 2011 federal election the most popular party was the CVP which received 51% of the vote. The next three most popular parties were the SVP (13.2%), the BDP (10.5%) and the SP (8.5%).

In Rueun 62.1% of the population (between age 25-64) have completed either non-mandatory upper secondary education or additional higher education (either university or a Fachhochschule).

As of 2011 Rueun had an unemployment rate of 0.97%. As of 2008, there were 26 people employed in the primary economic sector and about 11 businesses involved in this sector. 60 people are employed in the secondary sector and there are 11 businesses in this sector. 48 people are employed in the tertiary sector, with 11 businesses in this sector.

The historical population is given in the following table:

year	population
1850	365
1900	371
1910	495
1950	501
2000	460
2010	420
