= Pigniu =

- Former municipality
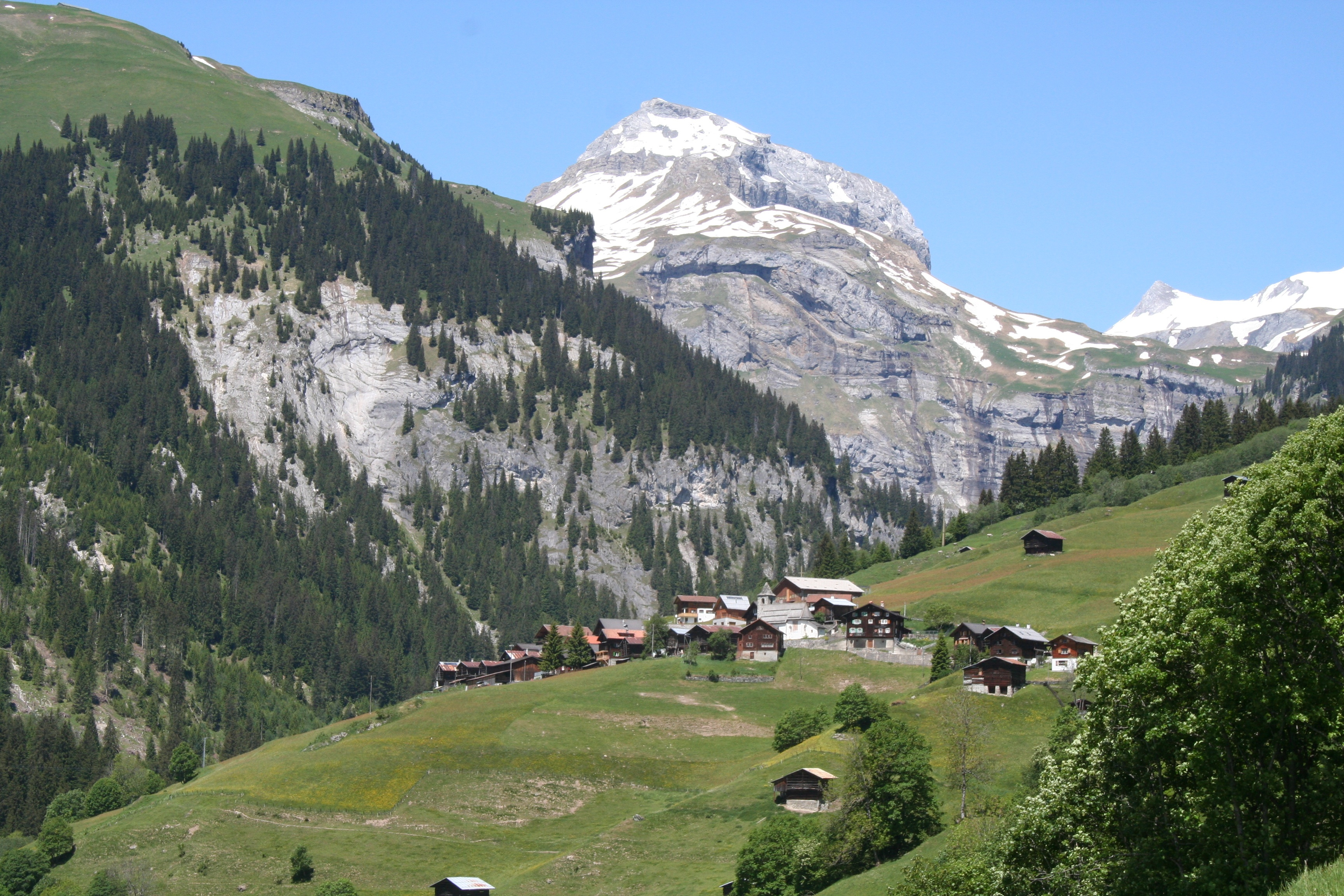

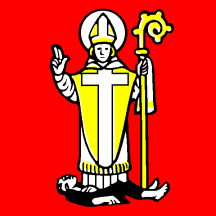
- Flag Coat of arms
- Location of Pigniu
- Location within Switzerland Location within Canton of Graubünden
- Coordinates: 46°48′N 9°06′E
- Country: Switzerland
- Canton: Graubünden
- District: Surselva

Area
  - Total: 17.98 km^{2} (6.94 sq mi)
- Elevation: 1,301 m (4,268 ft)

Population (Dec 2011)
  - Total: 33
  - Density: 1.8/km^{2} (4.8/sq mi)
- Time zone: UTC+01:00 (CET)
  - Summer (DST): UTC+02:00 (CEST)
- Postal code: 7156
- SFOS number: 3613
- ISO 3166 code: CH-GR
- Surrounded by: Andiast, Glarus Süd (GL), Rueun, Siat
- Website: www.pigniu.ch

Pigniu (German: Panix) is a former municipality in the district of Surselva in the canton of Graubünden in Switzerland. Its official language is Romansh. On 1 January 2014 the former municipalities of Pigniu, Castrisch, Ilanz, Ladir, Luven, Pitasch, Riein, Ruschein, Schnaus, Sevgein, Duvin, Rueun and Siat merged into the new municipality of Ilanz/Glion.

== History ==
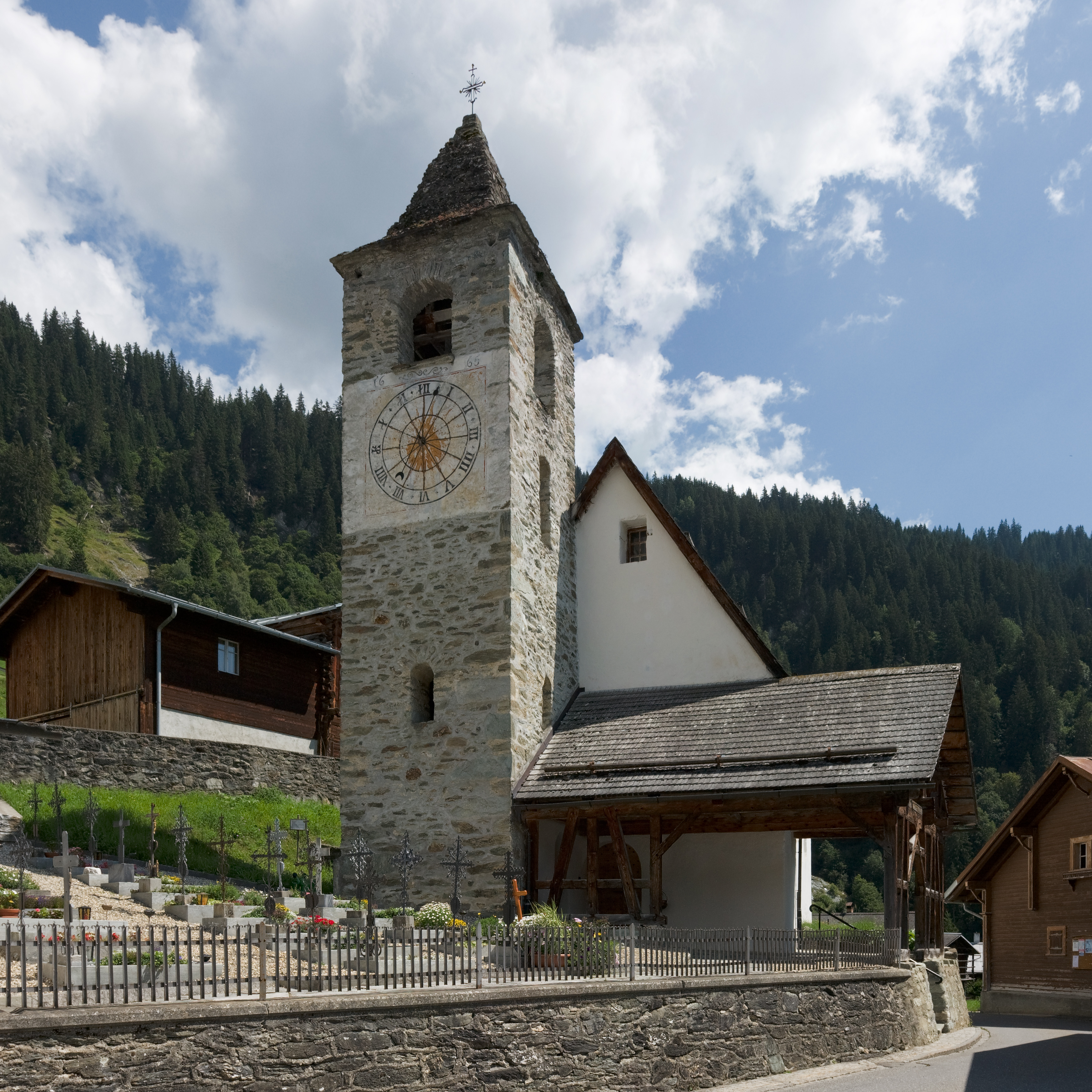
Church of St. Valentin

Pigniu was probably settled from Andiast. The name Pingyow first appears in 1403. The German name Panix is first mentioned in 1522. Until 1984 Pigniu was known as Pigniu/Panix.

The Church of St. Valentin was dedicated in 1465 and was a popular goal of pilgrimages. Until 1667, Pigniu had its own parish.

On 7 October 1799, the Russian Army under command of Field Marshal Suvorov crossed the Pigniu pass.

== Coat of arms ==
The blazon of the municipal coat of arms is Gules St. Valentin clad Or and Argent holding his dexter in blessing and in sinister a crosier of the second standing above an ill Boy clad Sable. The coat of arms comes from the seal of a patron of the parish church.

== Geography ==
Before the merger, Pigniu had a total area of 18.0 km^{2} (6.9 mi^{2}). Of this area, 36% is used for agricultural purposes, while 14.8% is forested. Of the rest of the land, 0.4% is settled (buildings or roads) and the remainder (48.8%) is non-productive (rivers, glaciers or mountains).

The former municipality is located in the Rueun sub-district of the Surselva district. It borders on the canton of Glarus at the entrance to Panix Pass. It lies on the old Alpine road into Italy over Lukmanier Pass.

Lag da Pigniu is a reservoir above the village.

== Demographics ==
Pigniu had a population (as of 2011) of 33. As of 2008, 5.7% of the population was made up of foreign nationals. Over the last 10 years the population has decreased at a rate of -29.6%. Most of the population (as of 2000) speaks Romansh (91.1%), with the rest speaking German (8.9%).

As of 2000, the gender distribution of the population was 50.0% male and 50.0% female. The age distribution, as of 2000, in Pigniu is; 7 children or 15.6% of the population are between 0 and 9 years old and 9 teenagers or 20.0% are between 10 and 19. Of the adult population, 4 people or 8.9% of the population are between 20 and 29 years old. 6 people or 13.3% are between 30 and 39, 9 people or 20.0% are between 40 and 49, and 2 people or 4.4% are between 50 and 59. The senior population distribution is 1person is between 60 and 69 years old, 5 people or 11.1% are between 70 and 79, there is 1 person who is between 80 and 89, and there is 1 person who is between 90 and 99.

In the 2007 federal election the most popular party was the SVP which received 72.3% of the vote. The next three most popular parties were the CVP (16.9%), the FDP (10.8%) and the SP (0%).

In Pigniu about 68.4% of the population (between age 25-64) have completed either non-mandatory upper secondary education or additional higher education (either university or a Fachhochschule).

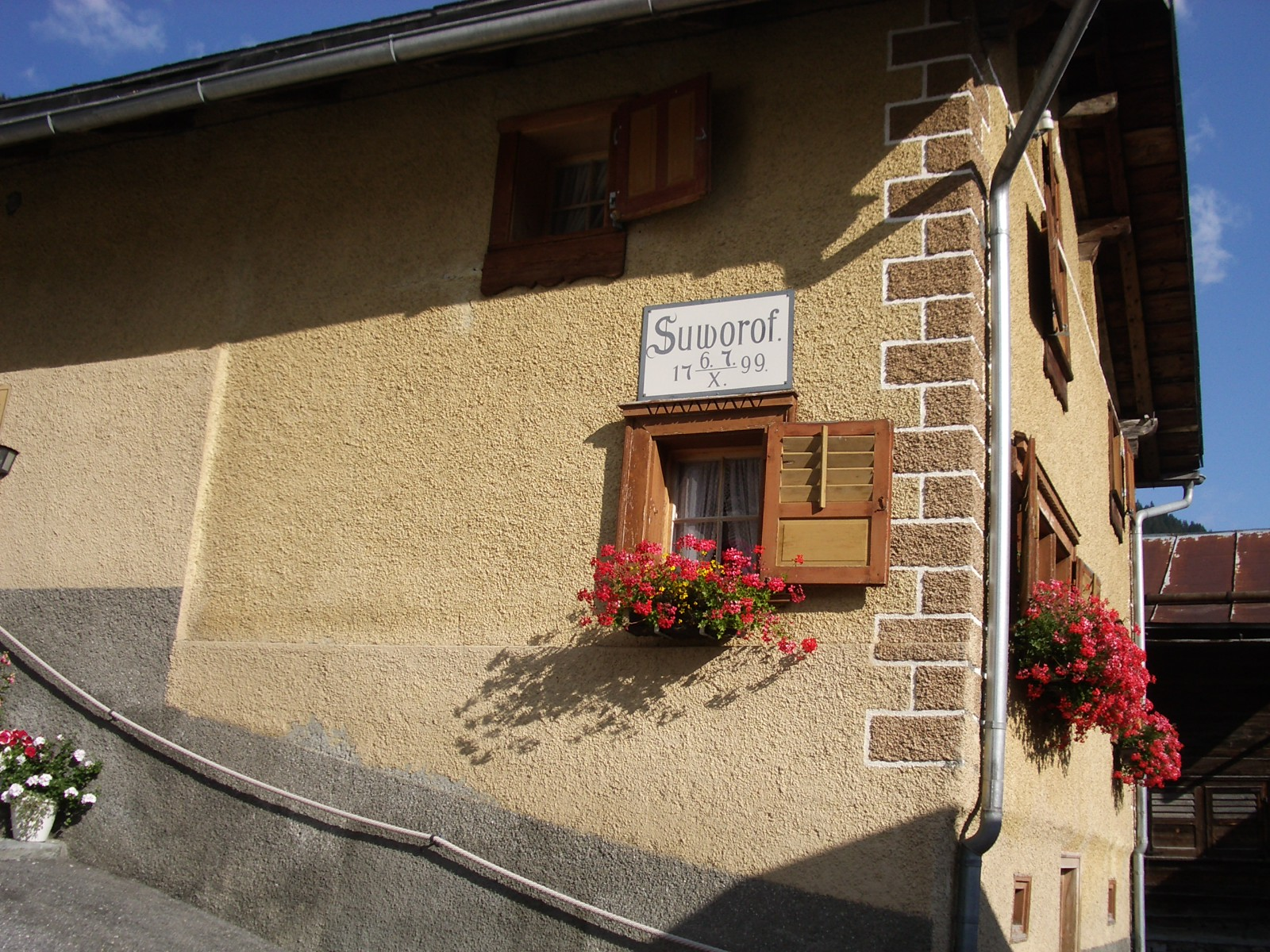
House in Pigniu

The historical population is given in the following table:

| year | population |
|---|---|
| 1850 | 70 |
| 1900 | 61 |
| 1920 | 87 |
| 1950 | 78 |
| 2000 | 45 |
| 2010 | 28 |

== Economy ==
Pigniu is a traditional farming community with no industry or commercial establishments. The school was closed in 1974. Since 1972, it has been supported by neighboring Schlieren.

Pigniu has an unemployment rate of 0.93%. As of 2005, there were 5 people employed in the primary economic sector and about 3 businesses involved in this sector. No one is employed in the secondary sector and there are no businesses in this sector. 1 person is employed in the tertiary sector, with 1 business in this sector.

== Weather ==
Pigniu has an average of 166.3 days of rain or snow per year and on average receives 1,347 mm (53.0 in) of precipitation. The wettest month is August during which time Pigniu receives an average of 141 mm (5.6 in) of rain or snow. During this month there is precipitation for an average of 16 days. The month with the most days of precipitation is May, with an average of 16.6, but with only 124 mm (4.9 in) of rain or snow. The driest month of the year is October with an average of 90 mm (3.5 in) of precipitation over 16 days.
