= Siat =

- Former municipality
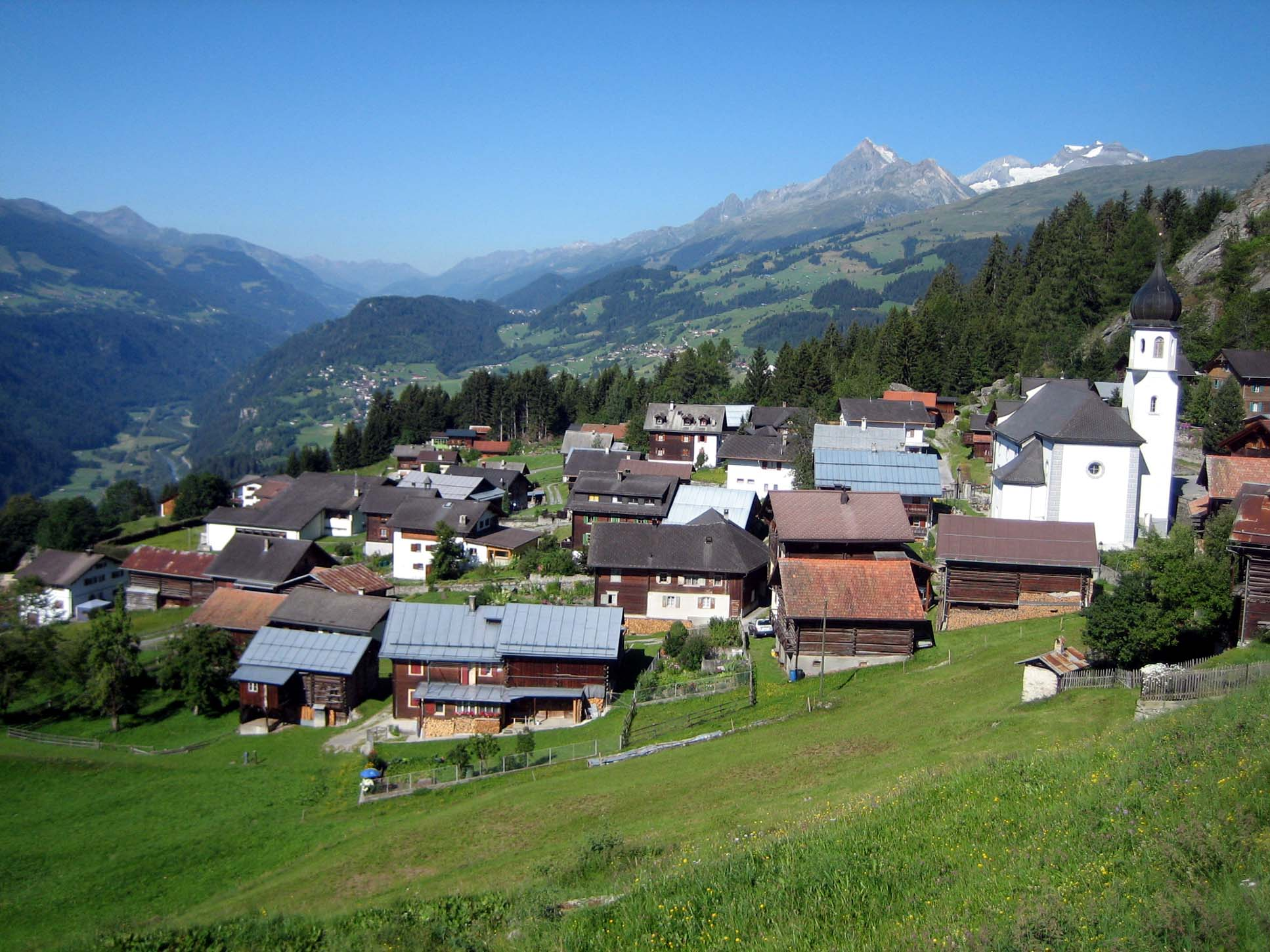

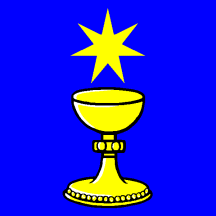
- Flag Coat of arms
- Location of Siat
- Location within Switzerland Location within Canton of Graubünden
- Coordinates: 46°47′N 9°09′E
- Country: Switzerland
- Canton: Graubünden
- District: Surselva

Area
  - Total: 13.48 km^{2} (5.20 sq mi)
- Elevation: 1,296 m (4,252 ft)

Population (Dec 2011)
  - Total: 171
  - Density: 12.7/km^{2} (32.9/sq mi)
- Time zone: UTC+01:00 (CET)
  - Summer (DST): UTC+02:00 (CEST)
- Postal code: 7157
- SFOS number: 3615
- ISO 3166 code: CH-GR
- Surrounded by: Glarus Süd (GL), Pigniu, Rueun, Ruschein, Schnaus
- Website: www.siat.ch

Siat is a former municipality in the district of Surselva in the Swiss canton of Graubünden. On 1 January 2014 the former municipalities of Siat, Castrisch, Ilanz, Ladir, Luven, Pitasch, Riein, Ruschein, Schnaus, Sevgein, Duvin, Pigniu and Rueun merged into the new municipality of Ilanz/Glion.

== History ==
Siat is first mentioned about 840 as Septe. Until 1943 Siat was known as Seth.

== Geography ==
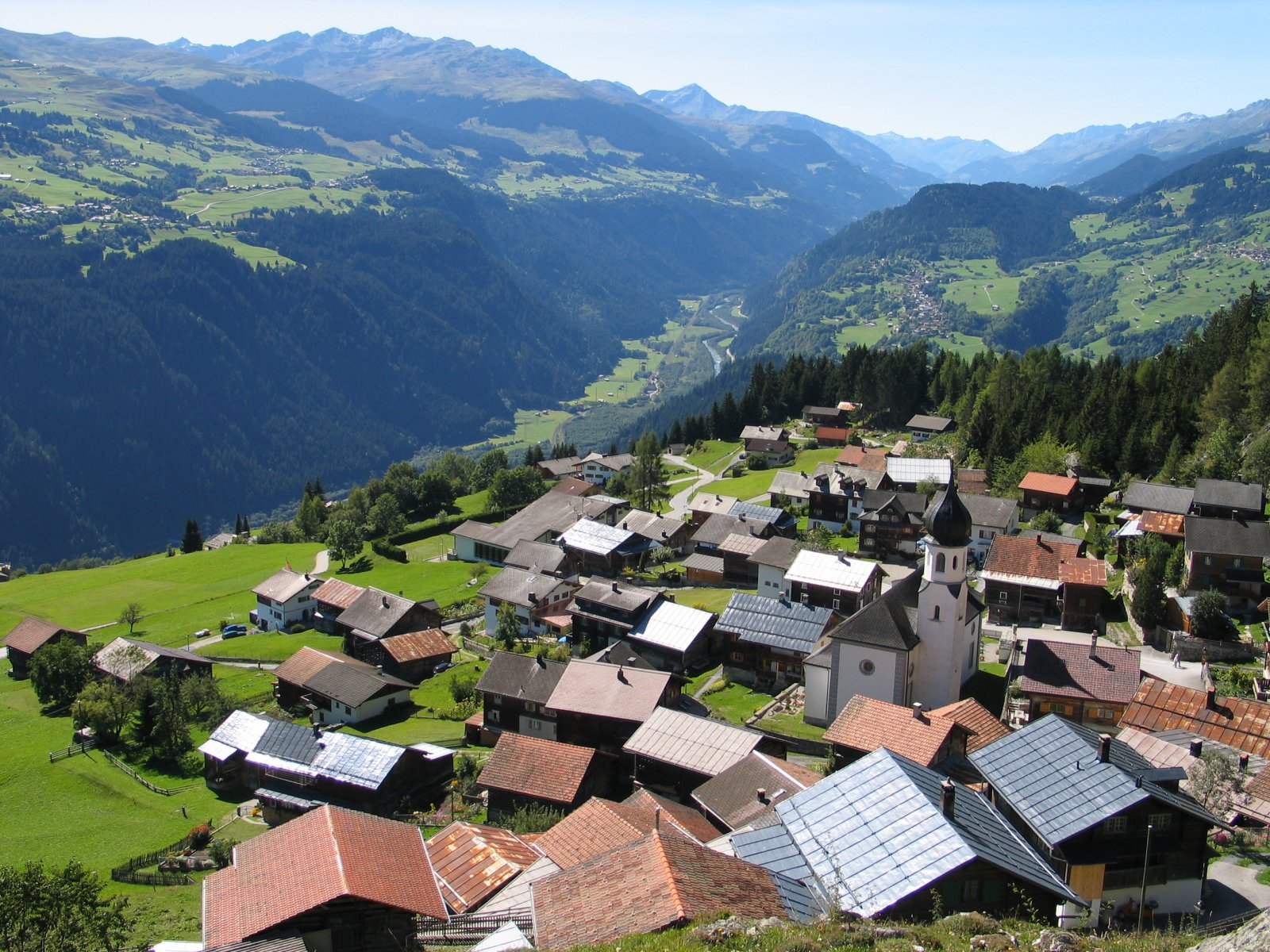
Siat village, looking down into the Vorderrhein valley and river.

Before the merger, Siat had a total area of 13.5 km^{2} (5.2 mi^{2}). Of this area, 51.1% is used for agricultural purposes, while 33.6% is forested. Of the rest of the land, 1.9% is settled (buildings or roads) and the remainder (13.4%) is non-productive (rivers, glaciers or mountains).

The former municipality is located in the Rueun sub-district of the Surselva district. It is located on the heights above the north side of the Vorderrhein valley and does actually not reach the plain in the valley nor the river. It consists of the haufendorf village (an irregular, unplanned and quite closely packed village, built around a central square) of Siat and the alpine herding camp of Alp da Siat on the upper end of the Val da Siat. The Senda Sursilvana multiday hiking trail passes the village as it follows the northern flank of the Vorderrhein through Falera, Ladir and Siat, continuing towards Panix.

== Coat of arms ==
The blazon of the municipal coat of arms is Azure a Cup Or and in Chief a Mullet of Seven of the same. The cup represents St. Florinus, the patron saint of the village church. The seven pointed star represents the Romansh name of the village, which means "seven".

== Demographics ==
Siat had a population (as of 2011) of 171. As of 2008, 2.8% of the population was made up of foreign nationals. Over the last 10 years the population has decreased at a rate of -12.3%. Most of the population (as of 2000) speaks Romansh (82.5%), with German being second most common (16.4%) and French being third ( 0.5%).

As of 2000, the gender distribution of the population was 50.0% male and 50.0% female. The age distribution, as of 2000, in Siat is; 25 children or 13.2% of the population are between 0 and 9 years old and 25 teenagers or 13.2% are between 10 and 19. Of the adult population, 8 people or 4.2% of the population are between 20 and 29 years old. 35 people or 18.5% are between 30 and 39, 20 people or 10.6% are between 40 and 49, and 15 people or 7.9% are between 50 and 59. The senior population distribution is 28 people or 14.8% of the population are between 60 and 69 years old, 21 people or 11.1% are between 70 and 79, there are 11 people or 5.8% who are between 80 and 89, and there is 1 person who is between 90 and 99.

In the 2007 federal election the most popular party was the CVP which received 49.8% of the vote. The next two most popular parties were the SVP (31.2%) and the FDP (8.8%).

In Siat about 65.9% of the population (between age 25-64) have completed either non-mandatory upper secondary education or additional higher education (either university or a Fachhochschule).

Siat has an unemployment rate of 0.11%. As of 2005, there were 20 people employed in the primary economic sector and about 9 businesses involved in this sector. 1 person is employed in the secondary sector and there is 1 business in this sector. 8 people are employed in the tertiary sector, with 4 businesses in this sector.

The historical population is given in the following table:

year	population
1803	203
1850	239
1900	185
1950	219
1960	241
1990	187
2000	189
