= Ilanz/Glion =

- Municipality
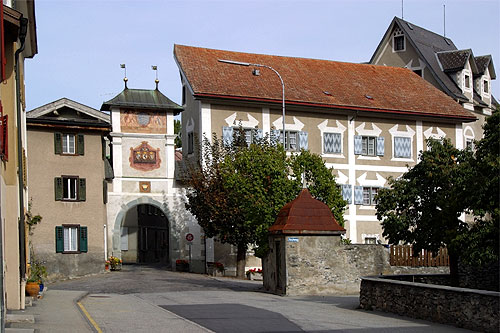

- Flag Coat of arms
- Location of Ilanz/Glion
- Location within Switzerland Location within Canton of Grisons
- Coordinates: 46°46′N 9°12′E
- Country: Switzerland
- Canton: Grisons
- District: Surselva

Government
  - Mayor: Gemeindepräsident/President (list); Aurelio Casanova (as of 2016)

Area
  - Total: 133.47 km^{2} (51.53 sq mi)

Population (Dec 2011)
  - Total: 4,573
  - Density: 34.26/km^{2} (88.74/sq mi)
- Time zone: UTC+01:00 (CET)
  - Summer (DST): UTC+02:00 (CEST)
- Postal code: 7130
- SFOS number: 3619
- ISO 3166 code: CH-GR
- Localities: Ilanz/Glion, Strada, Castrisch, Ladir, Luven, Pitasch, Riein, Ruschein, Schnaus, Sevgein, Duvin, Pigniu, Rueun, and Siat
- Surrounded by: Schluein, Sagogn, Safiental, Vals, Lumnezia, Obersaxen Mundaun, Waltensburg/Vuorz, Andiast, Glarus Süd (GL)
- Website: www.ilanz-glion.ch

Ilanz/Glion (German: Ilanz [ˈiːlants]; Romansh: Glion [ʎɔn]) is a municipality in the Surselva Region in the Swiss canton of the Grisons. On 1 January 2014 the former municipalities of Castrisch, Ilanz, Ladir, Luven, Pitasch, Riein, Ruschein, Schnaus, Sevgein, Duvin, Pigniu, Rueun, and Siat merged into the new municipality of Ilanz/Glion.

== History ==
Settlement	First mention		Ref.
Settlement	Date	Name	Ref.
Castrisch	765	Castrices	
Ladir	c. 850	Leitura	
Luven	765	Lobene	
Pitasch	c. 801–850 from a 16th-century copy of the lost original	Pictaui	
Pitasch	960	in Pictaso	
Riein	765	Renino	
Riein	960	Raine	
Ruschein	765	Rucene	
Schnaus	c. 840	Scanaues	
Sevgein	c. 840	Soviene	
Duvin	c. 840	Auna	
Duvin	1290	Aiuns	
Rueun; Ruis until 1943	765	Ruane	
Siat; Seth until 1943	c. 840	Septe	

=== Ilanz ===
Ilanz is first mentioned in 765 as Iliande. Ilanz became the capital of the newly formed Grey League in 1395. The Grey League was the second of Three Leagues which eventually formed canton Grisons. Johannes von Ilanz, the Abbott of Disentis, was among the three nobles instrumental in creating this "eternal alliance."

Ilanz has a special place in the history of the Protestant Reformation. In the 1520s, the Diet of Ilanz declared that citizens of the Three Leagues should be free to choose between Catholicism and the Protestant forms of Christianity rising to the fore. The so-called "Ilanz Reformation" of 1526 resulted in another systemic shock to the Catholic Church (which had been under philosophical attack since Zurich in 1523, when Protestantism first rose to primacy in a major population center). These and other events resulted in a counter-reformation within the Swiss Confederation that reversed many of the gains of the Reformation in Switzerland.

=== Pigniu ===
Pigniu was probably settled from Andiast. The name Pingyow first appears in 1403. The German name Panix is first mentioned in 1522. Until 1984 Pigniu was known as Pigniu/Panix.

The Church of St. Valentin was dedicated in 1465 and was a popular goal of pilgrimages. Until 1667, Pigniu had its parish.

On 7 October 1799, the Russian Army under command of Field Marshal Suvorov crossed the Pigniu pass.

== Geography ==
The former municipalities that now makeup Ilanz/Glion have a total combined area of 133.48 km^{2} (51.54 sq mi).

== Demographics ==
The total population of Ilanz/Glion (as of December 2020) is 4,797.

The historical population is given in the following chart:

== Weather ==
Ilanz has an average of 112.6 days of rain per year and on average receives 952 mm (37.5 in) of precipitation. The wettest month is August during which time Ilanz receives an average of 102 mm (4.0 in) of precipitation. During this month there is precipitation for an average of 11.4 days. The month with the most days of precipitation is June, with an average of 11.5, but with only 93 mm (3.7 in) of precipitation. The driest month of the year is October with an average of 63 mm (2.5 in) of precipitation over 11.4 days.

Pigniu has an average of 166.3 days of rain or snow per year and on average receives 1,347 mm (53.0 in) of precipitation. The wettest month is August during which time Pigniu receives an average of 141 mm (5.6 in) of rain or snow. During this month there is precipitation for an average of 16 days. The month with the most days of precipitation is May, with an average of 16.6, but with only 124 mm (4.9 in) of rain or snow. The driest month of the year is October with an average of 90 mm (3.5 in) of precipitation over 16 days.

== Sights ==
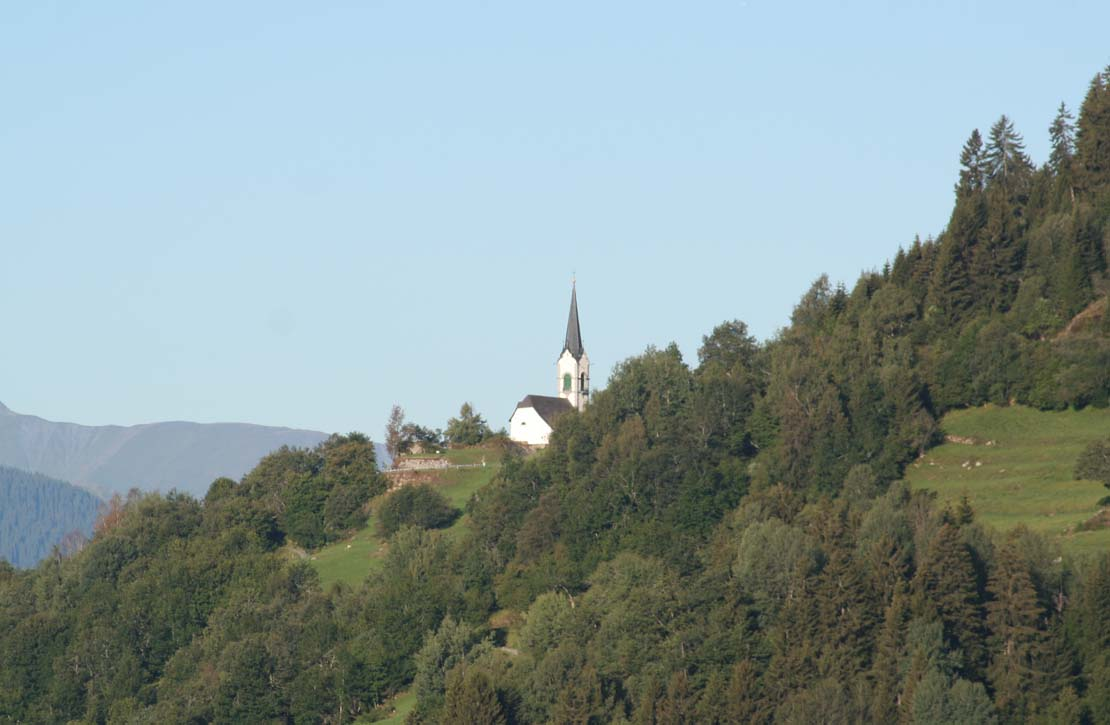
Church of Ladir

The village Church of St. Zeno in Ladir was first mentioned in 998. The choir wall paintings are worth seeing. Additionally, the municipality has an excellent view of the surrounding mountains and valleys. The ruins of Grüneck Castle (Ruine Grüneck), destroyed before 1544, are visible today in Ilanz village.

== Heritage sites of national significance ==
The Church of S. Margreta and the Church of S. Martin in Ilanz along with the Swiss Reformed Church building in Pitasch are listed as Swiss heritage sites of national significance.

The Reformed Church in Pitasch was built in the mid-12th century into its current form. The church floorplan is a single nave church with a single half-round apse. The interior murals date to about 1420, and on the exterior south wall is a mural of St. Martin and St. Christopher from the studio of the unknown Waltensburg Master which was painted about 1340.

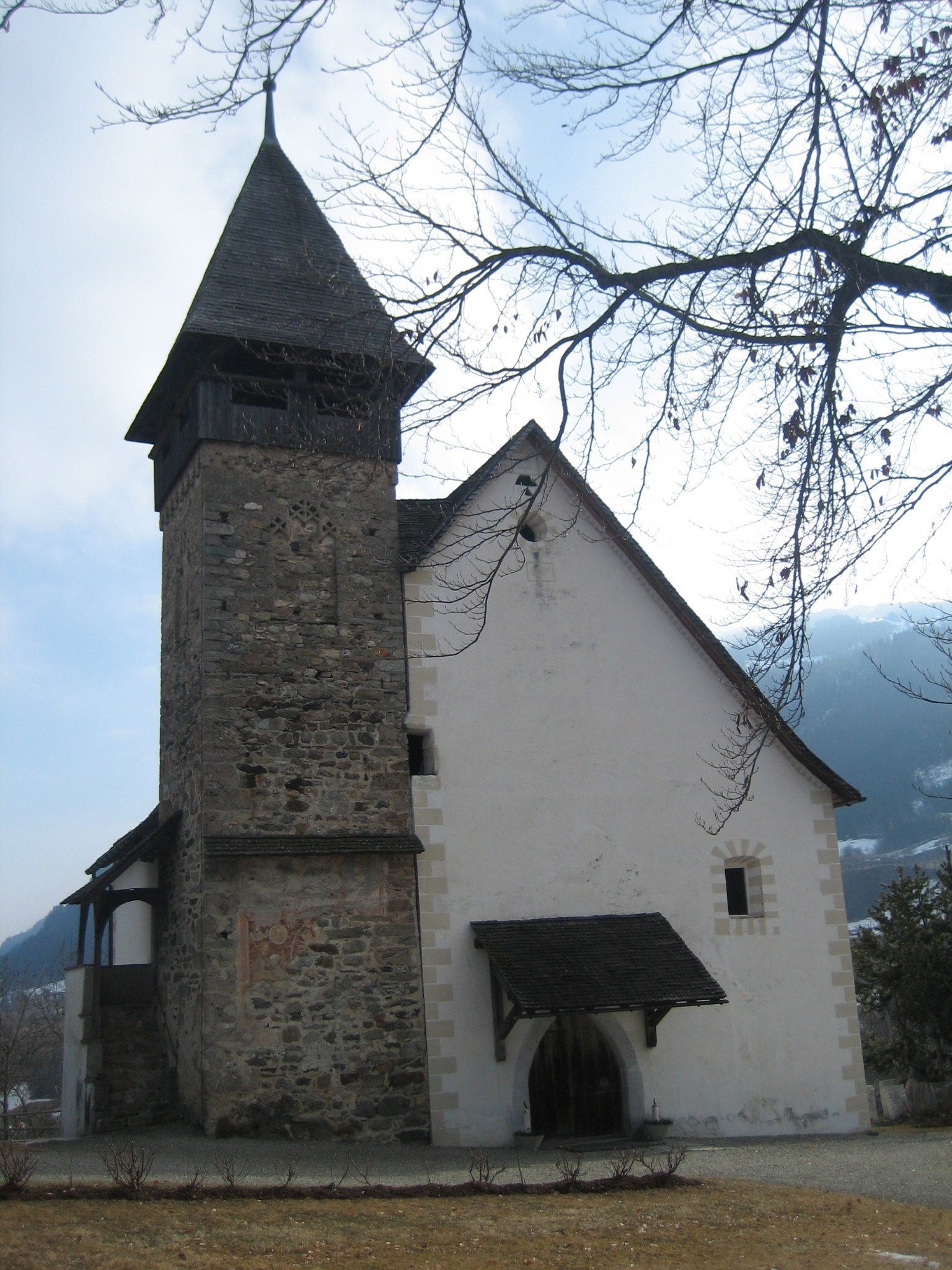
Church of S. Martin

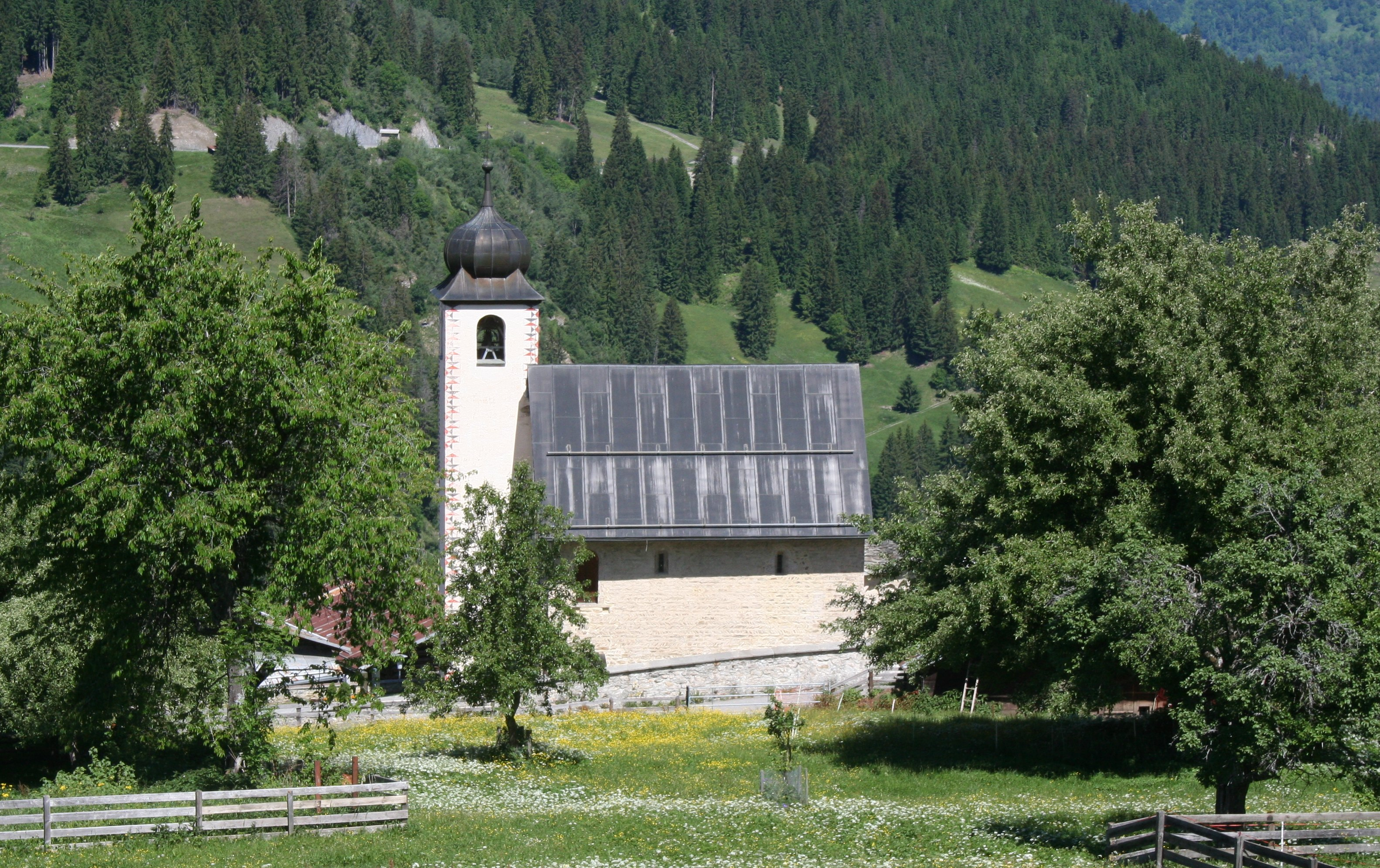
Exterior of the Church in Pitasch

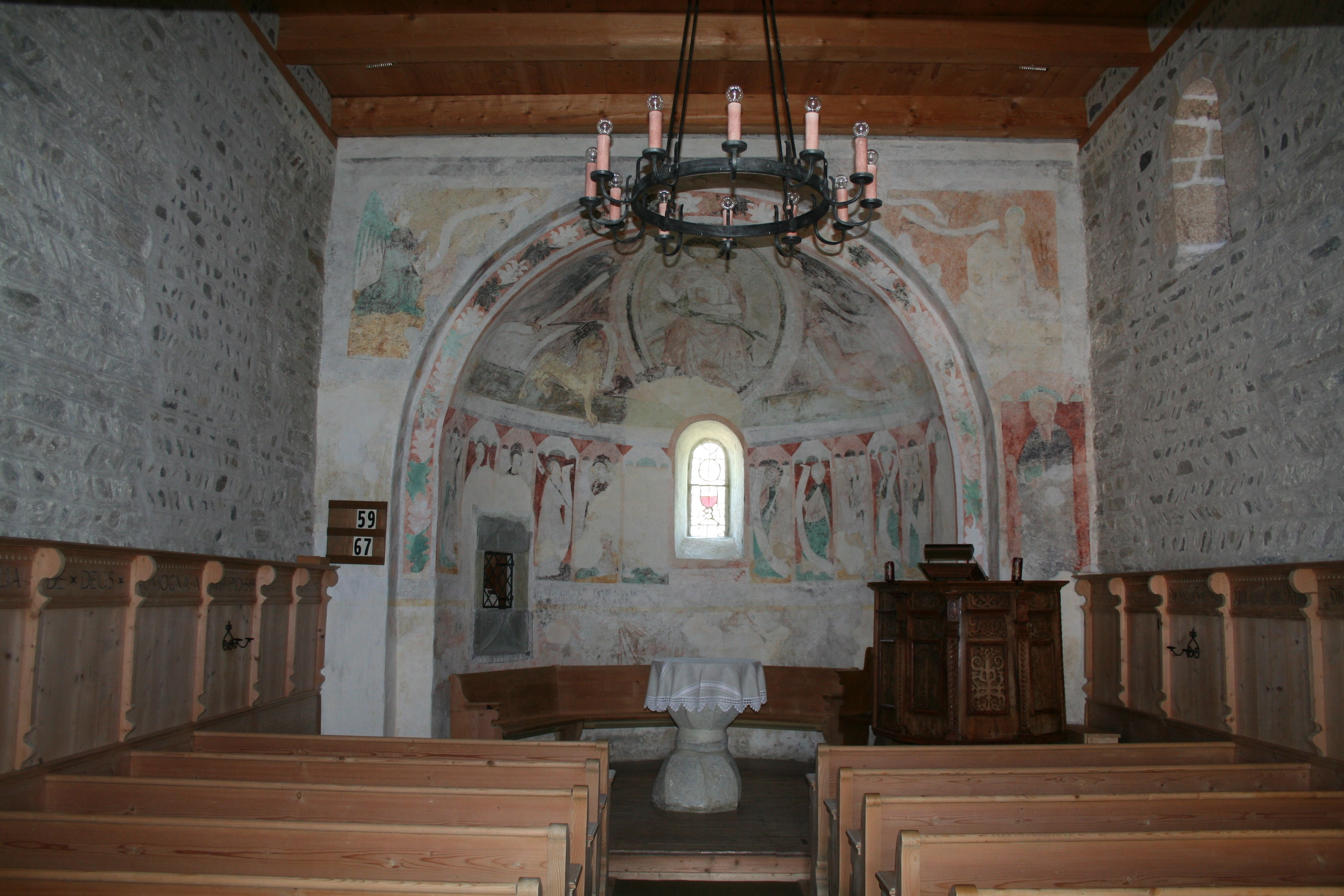
Interior of the church in Pitasch

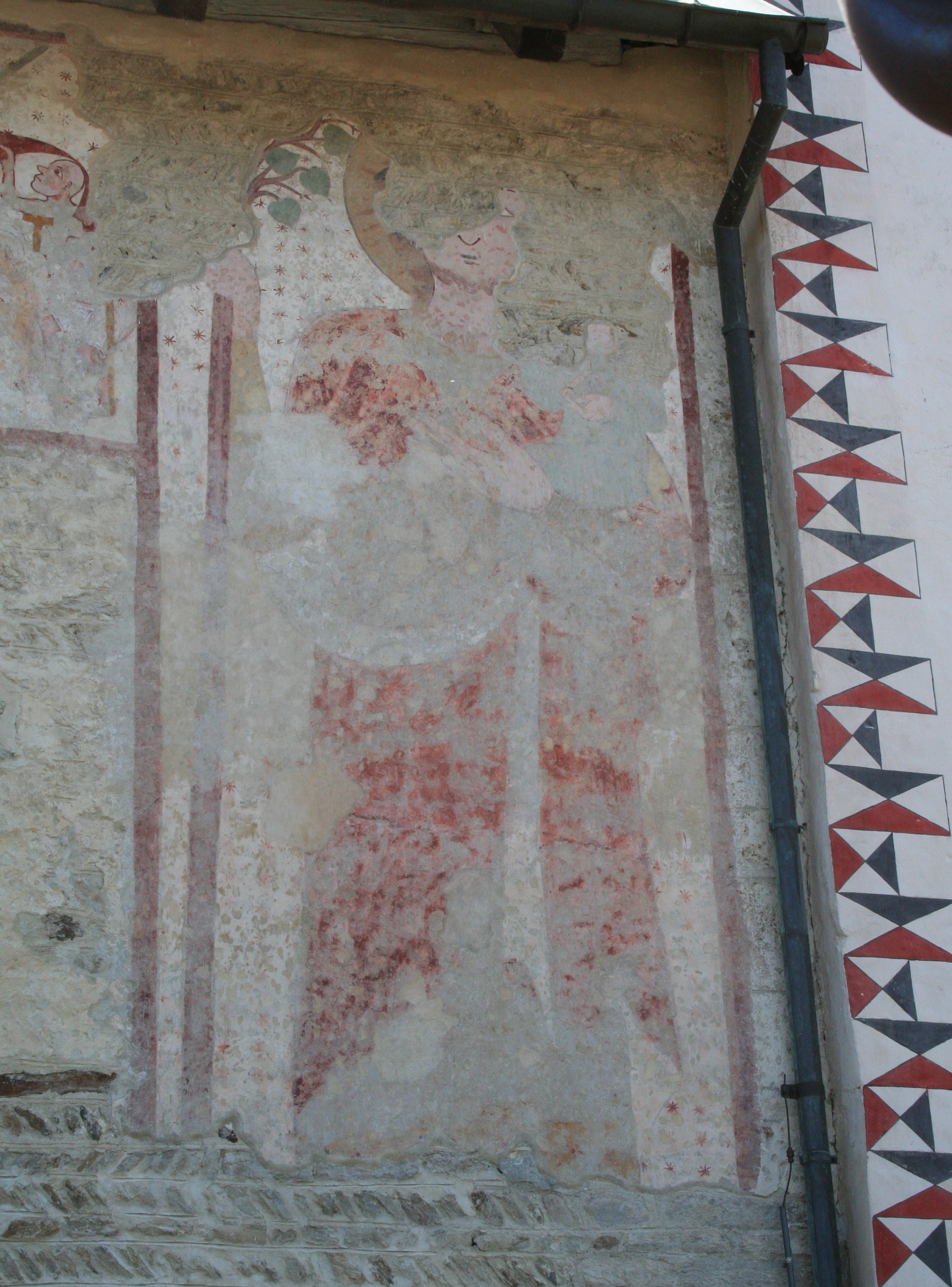
St. Christopher (Christoforus) in Pitasch

=== Other sites ===
The ruins of Grüneck Castle (Ruine Grüneck), destroyed before 1544, are visible today. A Carolingian hoard of two ornately decorated salt containers and coins was discovered near the ruins of the castle in 1811. One of the containers, which is made from antler and T-shaped, is now kept in the British Museum. A hoard of forty Carolingian gold coins, including nine denier, known as the Ilanz Hoard was discovered near the castle in 1904. In addition to the Carolingian coins, the horde contained Lombard and Arab coins. About 142 coins from discoveries near the castle are kept at the Rätisches Museum in Chur.

== Transportation ==
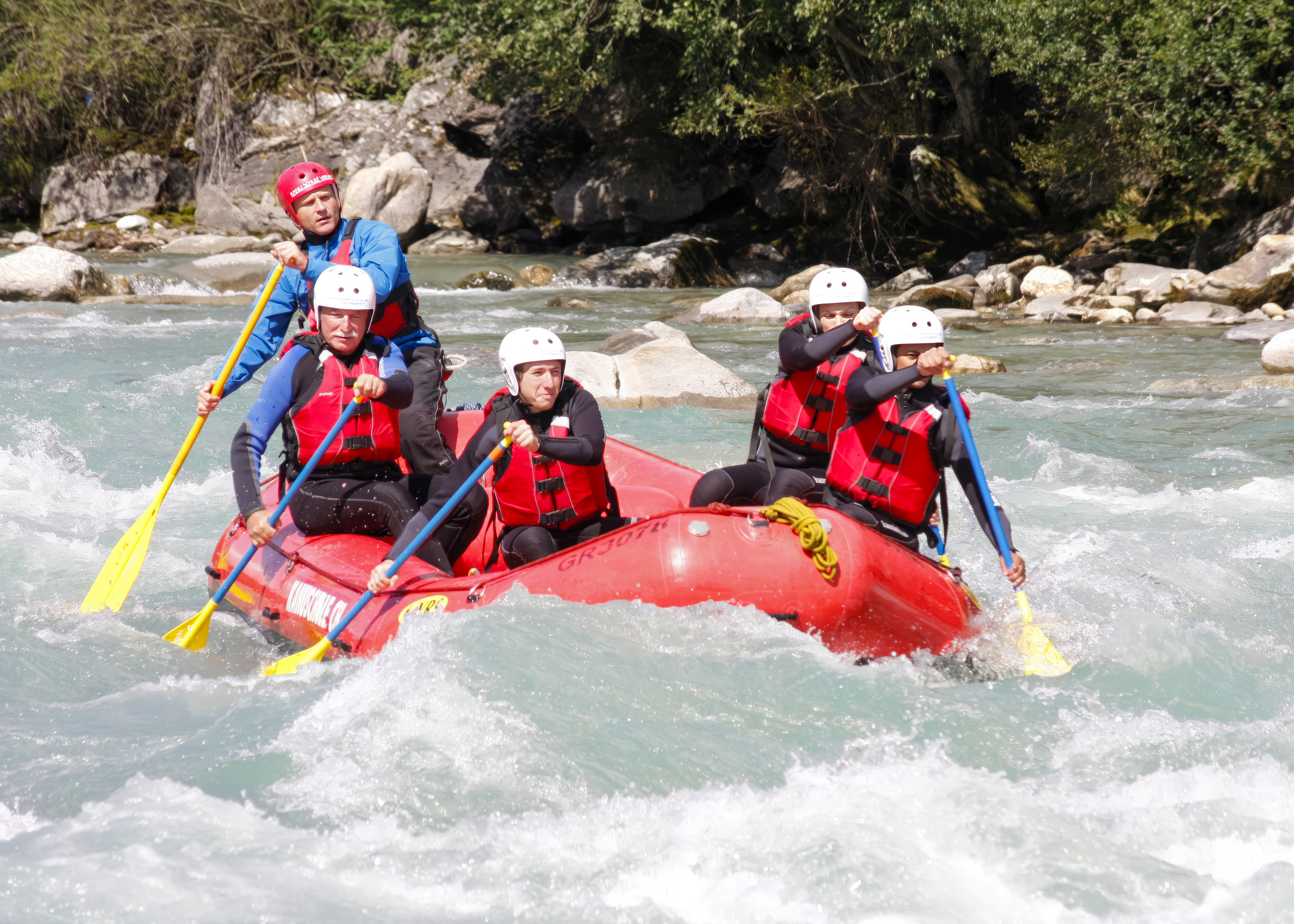
Rafting from Ilanz to Versam

The municipality has three railway stations: Castrisch, Ilanz, and Rueun. All three are located on the Reichenau-Tamins–Disentis/Mustér line with regular service to Disentis/Mustér and Scuol-Tarasp.
