= Pitasch =

- Former municipality
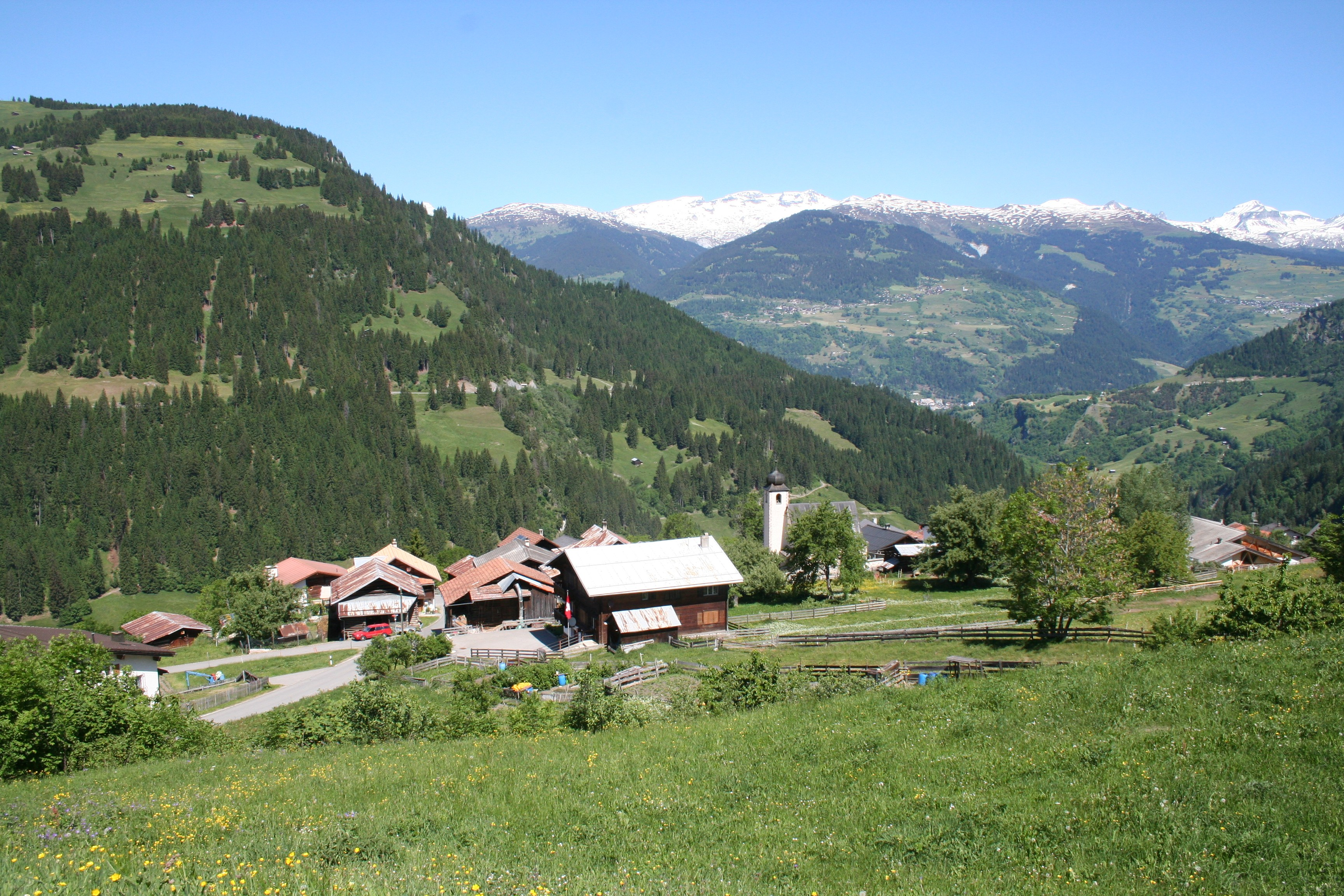

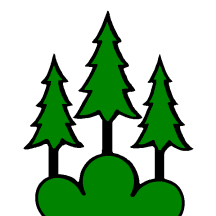
- Flag Coat of arms
- Location of Pitasch
- Location within Switzerland Location within Canton of Graubünden
- Coordinates: 46°43′N 9°13′E
- Country: Switzerland
- Canton: Graubünden
- District: Surselva

Area
  - Total: 10.81 km^{2} (4.17 sq mi)
- Elevation: 1,060 m (3,480 ft)

Population (Dec 2011)
  - Total: 106
  - Density: 9.81/km^{2} (25.4/sq mi)
- Time zone: UTC+01:00 (CET)
  - Summer (DST): UTC+02:00 (CEST)
- Postal code: 7111
- SFOS number: 3578
- ISO 3166 code: CH-GR
- Surrounded by: Cumbel, Duvin, Riein, Safien, Sevgein
- Website: www.pitasch.ch

Pitasch is a former municipality in the district of Surselva in the canton of Graubünden in Switzerland. On 1 January 2014 the former municipalities of Pitasch, Castrisch, Ilanz, Ladir, Luven, Riein, Ruschein, Schnaus, Sevgein, Duvin, Pigniu, Rueun and Siat merged into the new municipality of Ilanz/Glion.

== History ==
Pitasch is first mentioned about 801–50 as Pictaui though this comes from a 16th-century copy of the lost original. In 960 it was mentioned as in Pictaso.

== Geography ==
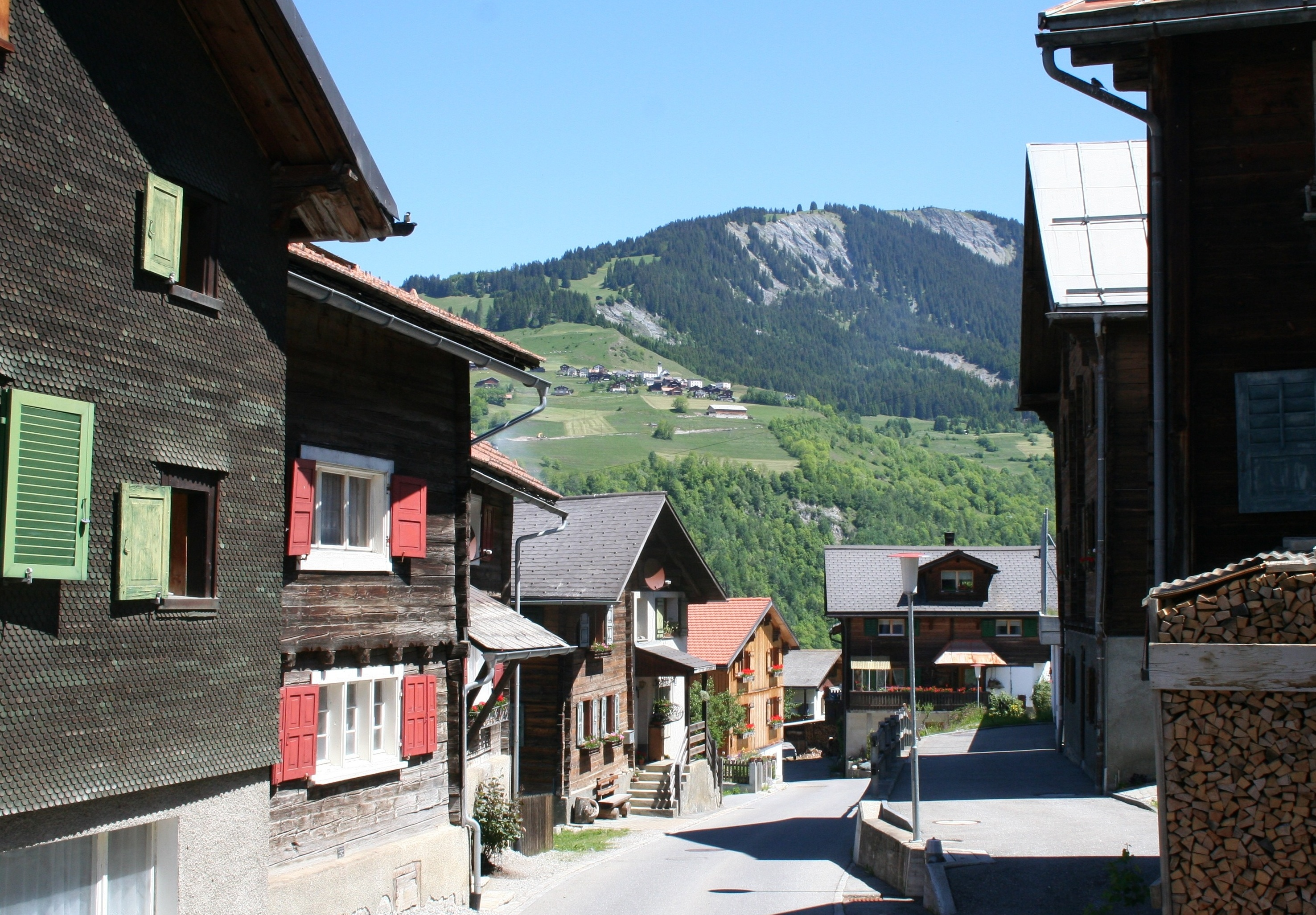
Pitasch village with Riein in the background

Before the merger, Pitasch had a total area of 10.8 km^{2} (4.2 mi^{2}). Of this area, 31.4% is used for agricultural purposes, while 49.1% is forested. Of the rest of the land, 1.5% is settled (buildings or roads) and the remainder (18%) is non-productive (rivers, glaciers or mountains).

The former municipality is located in the Ilanz sub-district of the Surselva district. Before 2000 it was part of the Glenner district. It is located south of Ilanz on a terrace between the Val Renastga and the Val da Pitasch on the old road between Castrisch over the Güner Kreuz to Safien.

== Demographics ==
Pitasch had a population (as of 2011) of 106. As of 2008, 2.7% of the population was made up of foreign nationals. Over the last 10 years the population has decreased at a rate of -0.9%. Most of the population (as of 2000) speaks Romansh (60.2%), with the rest speaking German (39.8%).

As of 2000, the gender distribution of the population was 52.2% male and 47.8% female. The age distribution, as of 2000, in Pitasch is; 19 children or 16.1% of the population are between 0 and 9 years old and 26 teenagers or 22.0% are between 10 and 19. Of the adult population, 8 people or 6.8% of the population are between 20 and 29 years old. 21 people or 17.8% are between 30 and 39, 16 people or 13.6% are between 40 and 49, and 11 people or 9.3% are between 50 and 59. The senior population distribution is 10 people or 8.5% of the population are between 60 and 69 years old, 6 people or 5.1% are between 70 and 79, there is 1 person who is between 80 and 89.

In the 2007 federal election the most popular party was the SVP which received 41.3% of the vote. The next three most popular parties were the FDP (26.5%), the SP (20.9%) and the CVP (11.2%).

In Pitasch about 70.1% of the population (between age 25–64) have completed either non-mandatory upper secondary education or additional higher education (either university or a Fachhochschule).

Pitasch has an unemployment rate of 2.05%. As of 2005, there were 20 people employed in the primary economic sector and about 8 businesses involved in this sector. people are employed in the secondary sector and there are businesses in this sector. 6 people are employed in the tertiary sector, with 3 businesses in this sector.

The historical population is given in the following table:

year	population
1850	96
1900	105
1950	125
2000	118

== Heritage sites of national significance ==
The Swiss Reformed Church building in Pitasch is listed as a Swiss heritage site of national significance.

The Reformed Church was built in the mid-12th century into its current form. The church floorplan is a single nave church with a single half round apse. The interior murals date to about 1420, and on the exterior south wall is a mural of St. Martin and St. Christopher from the studio of the unknown Waltensburg Master which was painted about 1340.

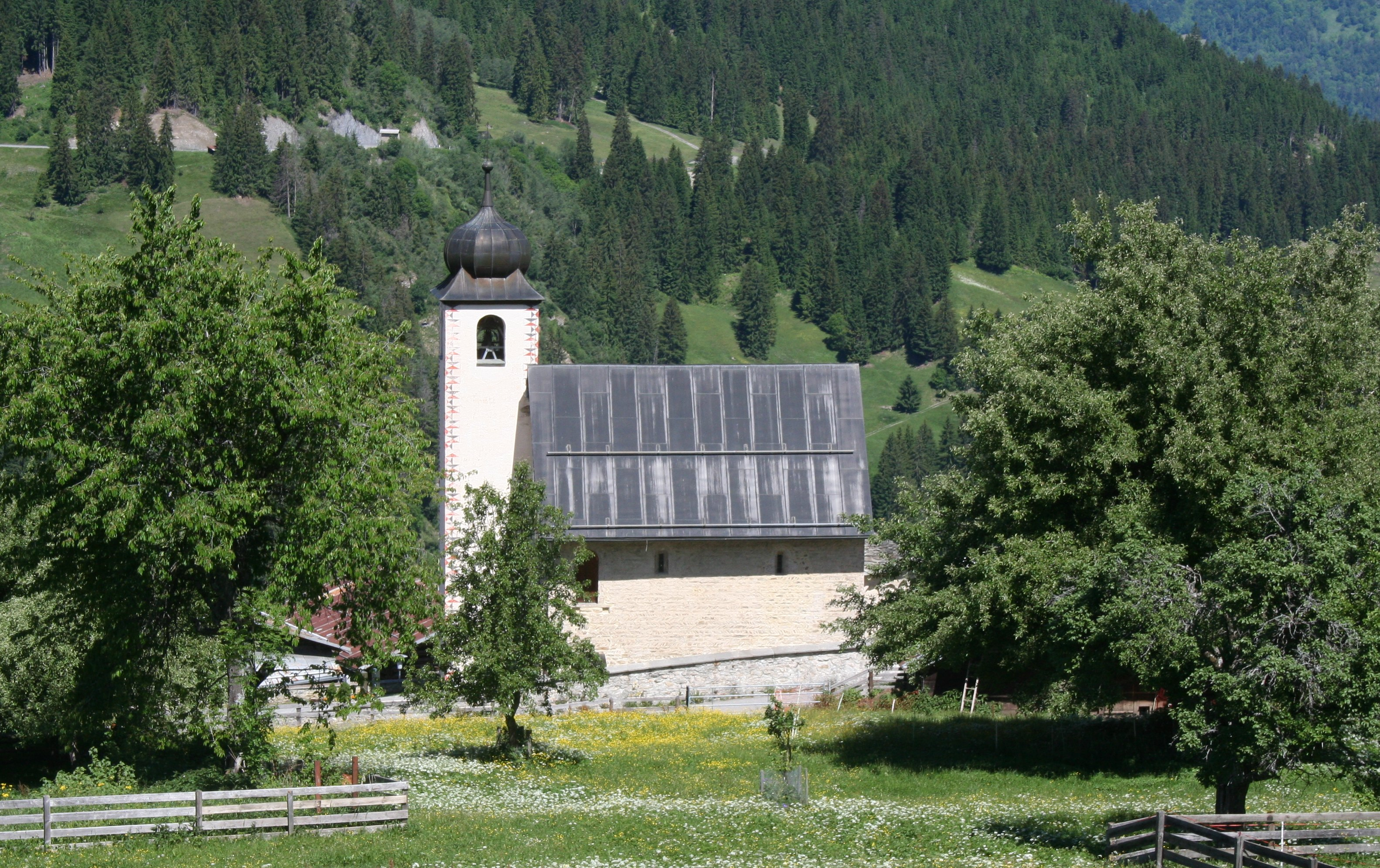
Exterior of the Church in Pitasch

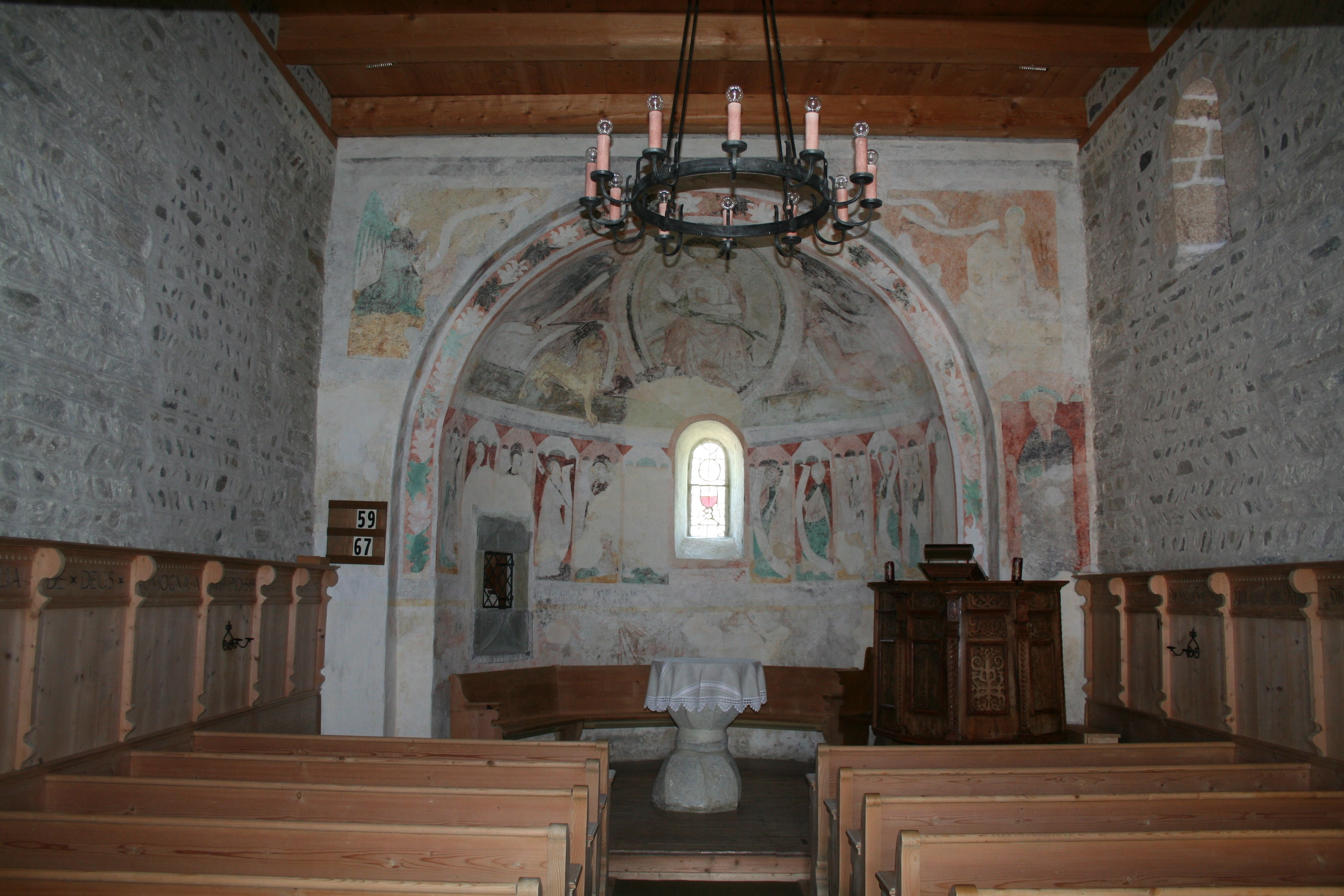
Interior of the church

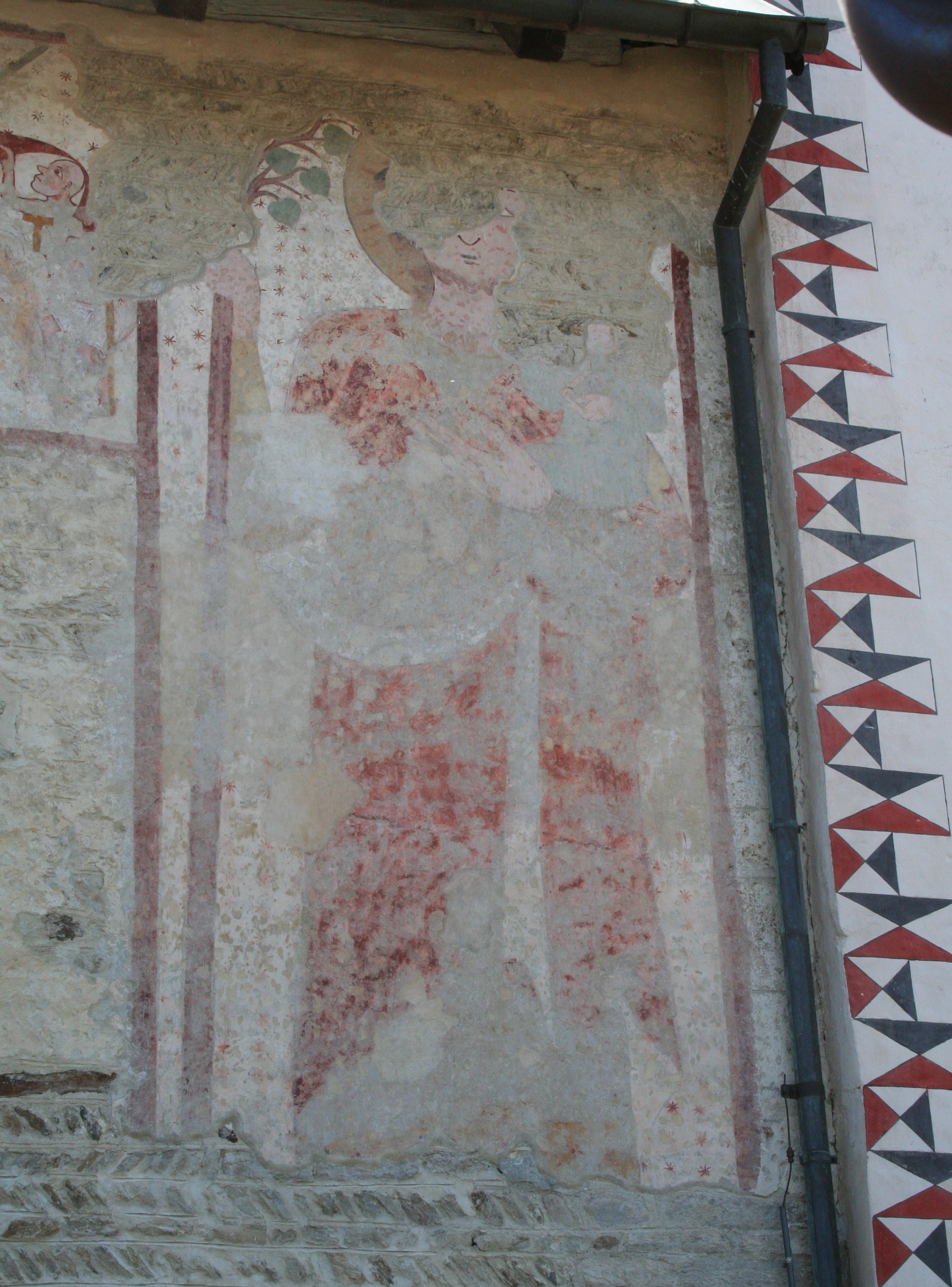
St. Christopher (Christoforus)
