= Luven =

- Former municipality
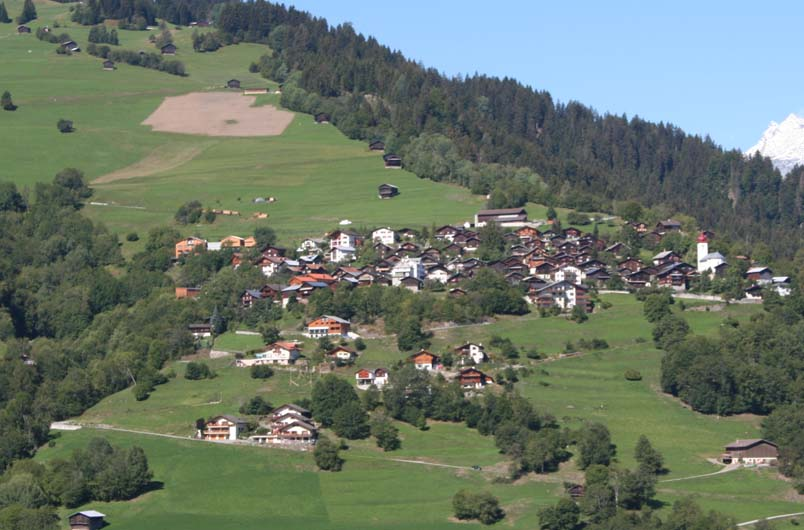

- Flag Coat of arms
- Location of Luven
- Location within Switzerland Location within Canton of Graubünden
- Coordinates: 46°45′N 9°11′E
- Country: Switzerland
- Canton: Graubünden
- District: Surselva

Area
  - Total: 6.83 km^{2} (2.64 sq mi)
- Elevation: 998 m (3,274 ft)

Population (Dec 2011)
  - Total: 199
  - Density: 29.1/km^{2} (75.5/sq mi)
- Time zone: UTC+01:00 (CET)
  - Summer (DST): UTC+02:00 (CEST)
- Postal code: 7141
- SFOS number: 3577
- ISO 3166 code: CH-GR
- Surrounded by: Cumbel, Flond, Ilanz, Morissen, Sevgein, Surcuolm
- Website: www.luven.ch

Luven (formerly known as Luvis) is a former municipality in the district of Surselva in the Swiss canton of Graubünden. On 1 January 2014 the former municipalities of Luven, Castrisch, Ilanz, Ladir, Pitasch, Riein, Ruschein, Schnaus, Sevgein, Duvin, Pigniu, Rueun and Siat merged into the new municipality of Ilanz/Glion.

== History ==
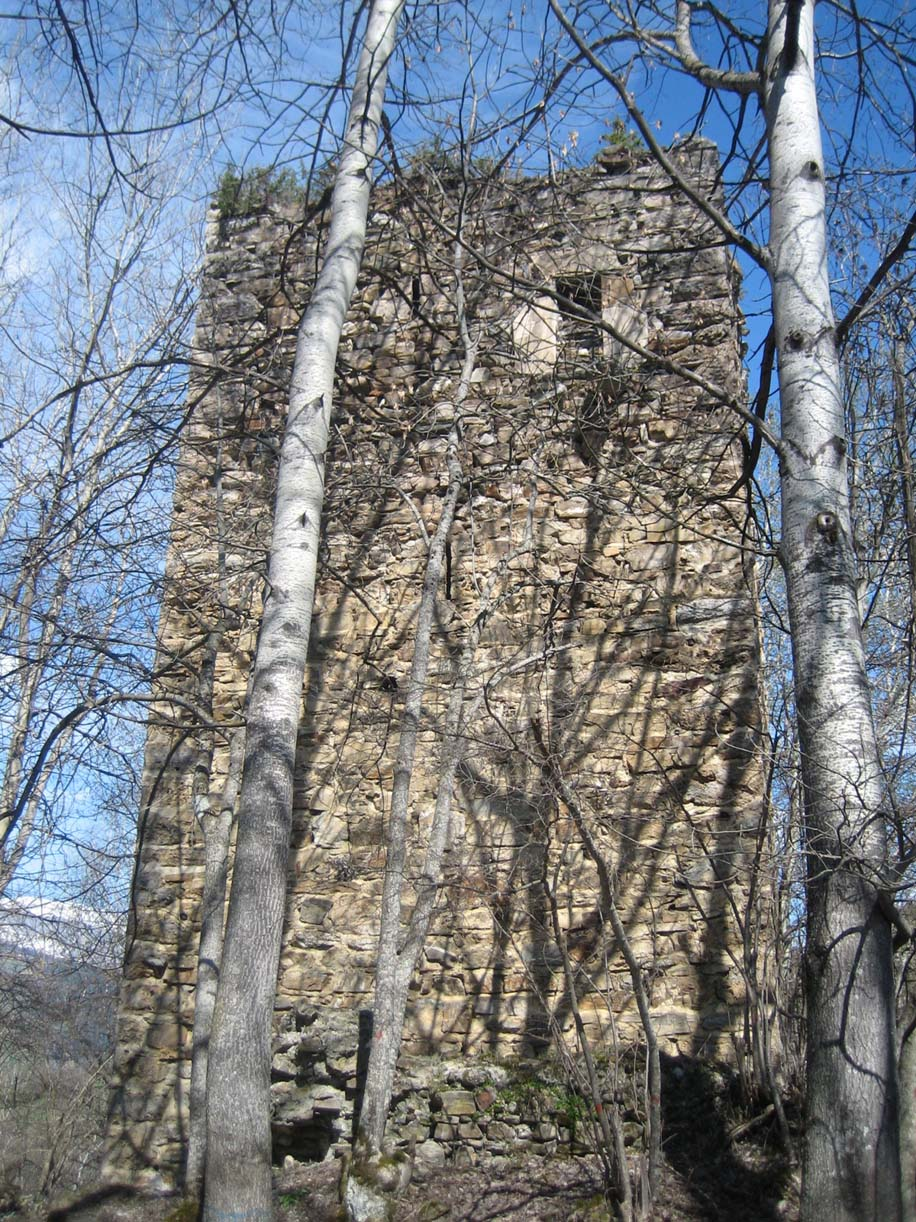
Ruins of the village Castelberg tower

Luven is first mentioned in 765 as Lobene.

== Coat of arms ==
The municipal coat of arms is a red field with a white Bible with black Alpha and Omega letters on it. It represents the conversion of the village to the Protestant Reformation.

== Geography ==
Aerial view (1949)

Before the merger, Luven had a total area of 6.6 km^{2} (2.5 mi^{2}). Of this area, 52% is used for agricultural purposes, while 41.9% is forested. Of the rest of the land, 4.5% is settled (buildings or roads) and the remainder (1.7%) is non-productive (rivers, glaciers or mountains).

The former municipality is located in the Ilanz sub-district of the Surselva district. Before 2000 it was part of the Glenner district. It is located on the eastern slope of the Piz Mundaun. Until 1943 Luven was known by its German name as Luvis.

== Demographics ==
Luven had a population (as of 2011) of 199. As of 2008, 2.6% of the population was made up of foreign nationals. Over the last 10 years the population has decreased at a rate of -9.7%. Most of the population (as of 2000) speaks the Sursilvan dialect of Romansh (59.6%), with German being second most common (35.0%) and Albanian being third (3.8%).

As of 2000, the gender distribution of the population was 48.4% male and 51.6% female. The age distribution, as of 2000, in Luven is; 33 children or 18.0% of the population are between 0 and 9 years old and 17 teenagers or 9.3% are between 10 and 19. Of the adult population, 21 people or 11.5% of the population are between 20 and 29 years old. 25 people or 13.7% are between 30 and 39, 25 people or 13.7% are between 40 and 49, and 18 people or 9.8% are between 50 and 59. The senior population distribution is 17 people or 9.3% of the population are between 60 and 69 years old, 19 people or 10.4% are between 70 and 79, there are 7 people or 3.8% who are between 80 and 89 there is 1 person who is between 90 and 99.

In the 2007 federal election the most popular party was the SVP which received 57.7% of the vote. The next three most popular parties were the SP (20.7%), the FDP (9.7%) and the CVP (8.3%).

The entire Swiss population is generally well educated. In Luven about 65.5% of the population (between age 25-64) have completed either non-mandatory upper secondary education or additional higher education (either university or a Fachhochschule).

Luven has an unemployment rate of 0.32%. As of 2005, there were 25 people employed in the primary economic sector and about 9 businesses involved in this sector. 6 people are employed in the secondary sector and there are 2 businesses in this sector. 9 people are employed in the tertiary sector, with 4 businesses in this sector.

The historical population is given in the following table:

year	population
1850	297
1900	259
1950	208
2000	183
