= Ladir =

- Former municipality
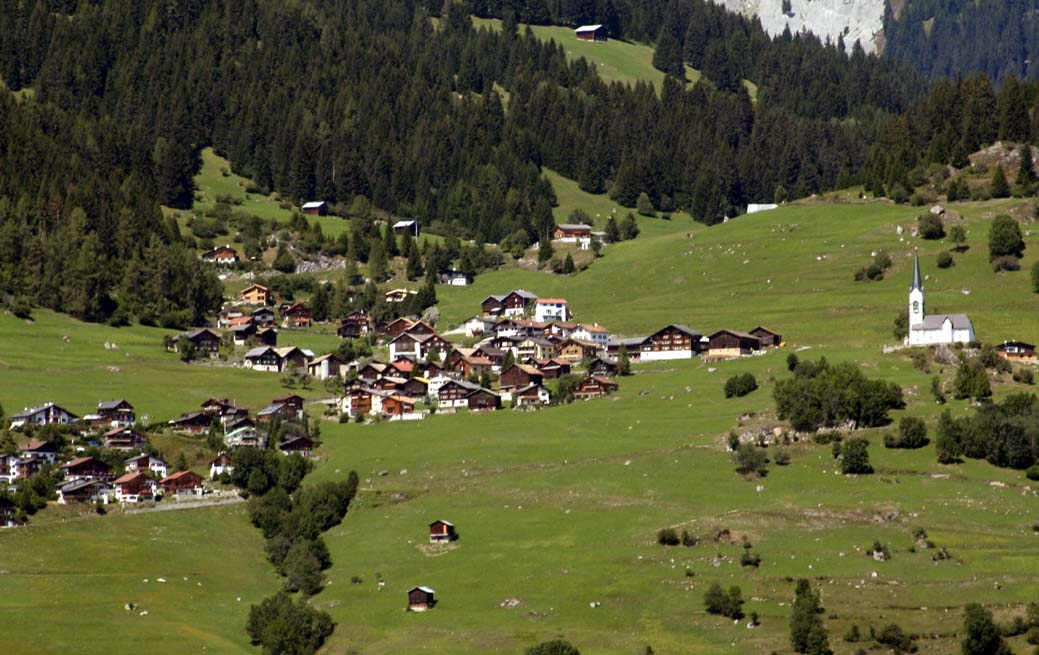

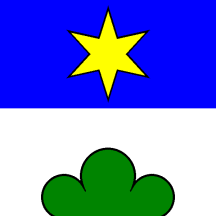
- Flag Coat of arms
- Location of Ladir
- Location within Switzerland Location within Canton of Graubünden
- Coordinates: 46°47′N 9°12′E
- Country: Switzerland
- Canton: Graubünden
- District: Surselva

Area
  - Total: 7.21 km^{2} (2.78 sq mi)
- Elevation: 1,276 m (4,186 ft)

Population (Dec 2011)
  - Total: 115
  - Density: 16.0/km^{2} (41.3/sq mi)
- Time zone: UTC+01:00 (CET)
  - Summer (DST): UTC+02:00 (CEST)
- Postal code: 7155
- SFOS number: 3576
- ISO 3166 code: CH-GR
- Surrounded by: Falera, Ruschein, Schluein, Schnaus
- Website: www.ladir.ch

Ladir is a former municipality in the district of Surselva in the Swiss canton of Graubünden. On 1 January 2014 the former municipalities of Ladir, Castrisch, Ilanz, Luven, Pitasch, Riein, Ruschein, Schnaus, Sevgein, Duvin, Pigniu, Rueun and Siat merged into the new municipality of Ilanz/Glion.

== History ==
Ladir is first mentioned about 850 as Leitura.

== Geography ==
Before the merger, Ladir had a total area of 7.2 km^{2} (2.8 mi^{2}). Of this area, 50.3% is used for agricultural purposes, while 42.2% is forested. Of the rest of the land, 2.6% is settled (buildings or roads) and the remainder (4.9%) is non-productive (rivers, glaciers or mountains).

The former municipality is located in the Ilanz sub-district of the Surselva district. Before 2000, it was part of the Glenner district. It is located in the heights of the northern flank of the "Gruob" also known as the Ilanz area. It consists of the village of Ladir and the exclave alpine settlement of Dadens da Ladir on the Crap Masegn mountain. The municipality does actually not reach the plain in the valley nor the banks of river Rhine. The Senda Sursilvana multiday hiking trail passes the village as it follows the northern flank of the Vorderrhein through Falera and Siat, continuing towards Panix.

== Demographics ==
Ladir had a population (as of 2011) of 115. As of 2008, 9.7% of the population was made up of foreign nationals. Over the last 10 years the population has decreased at a rate of 0%. Most of the population (as of 2000) speaks Romansh(57.0%), with German being second most common (41.1%) and French being third ( 1.9%).

As of 2000, the gender distribution of the population was 53.1% male and 46.9% female. The age distribution, as of 2000, in Ladir is; 6 children or 5.6% of the population are between 0 and 9 years old and 22 teenagers or 20.6% are between 10 and 19. Of the adult population, 13 people or 12.1% of the population are between 20 and 29 years old. 13 people or 12.1% are between 30 and 39, 12 people or 11.2% are between 40 and 49, and 10 people or 9.3% are between 50 and 59. The senior population distribution is 13 people or 12.1% of the population are between 60 and 69 years old, 13 people or 12.1% are between 70 and 79, there are 5 people or 4.7% who are between 80 and 89.

In the 2007 federal election the most popular party was the SVP which received 44.8% of the vote. The next three most popular parties were the CVP (28.3%), the FDP (13.8%) and the SP (11%).

Ladir has an unemployment rate of 1.8%. As of 2005, there were 9 people employed in the primary economic sector and about 3 businesses involved in this sector. 4 people are employed in the secondary sector and there are 2 businesses in this sector. 5 people are employed in the tertiary sector, with 2 businesses in this sector.

The historical population is given in the following table:

year	population
1850	98
1900	94
1950	139
2000	107

== Education ==
The municipality has lacked a school since 1980. The children are educated in the neighboring municipality of Ruschein while secondary students are educated in Ilanz. In Ladir about 77.3% of the population (between age 25-64) have completed either non-mandatory upper secondary education or additional higher education (either university or a Fachhochschule).

== Sights ==
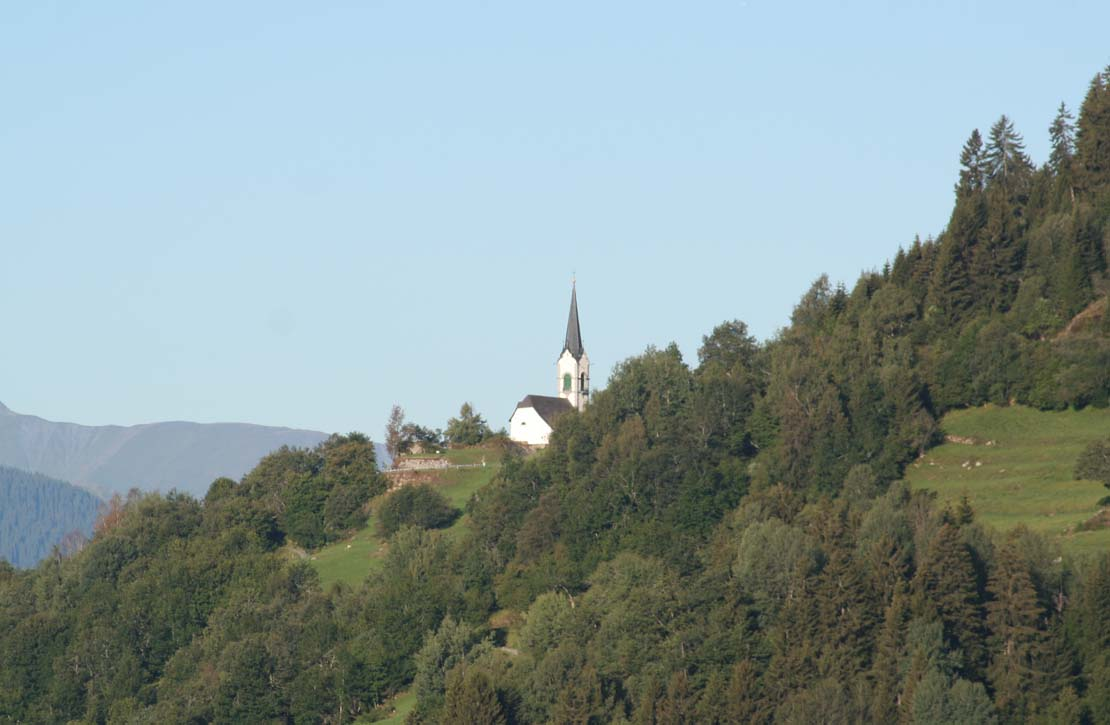
Church of Ladir

The village Church of St. Zeno was first mentioned in 998. The choir wall paintings are worth seeing. Additionally, the municipality has an excellent view of the surrounding mountains and valleys.
