= Riein =

- Former municipality
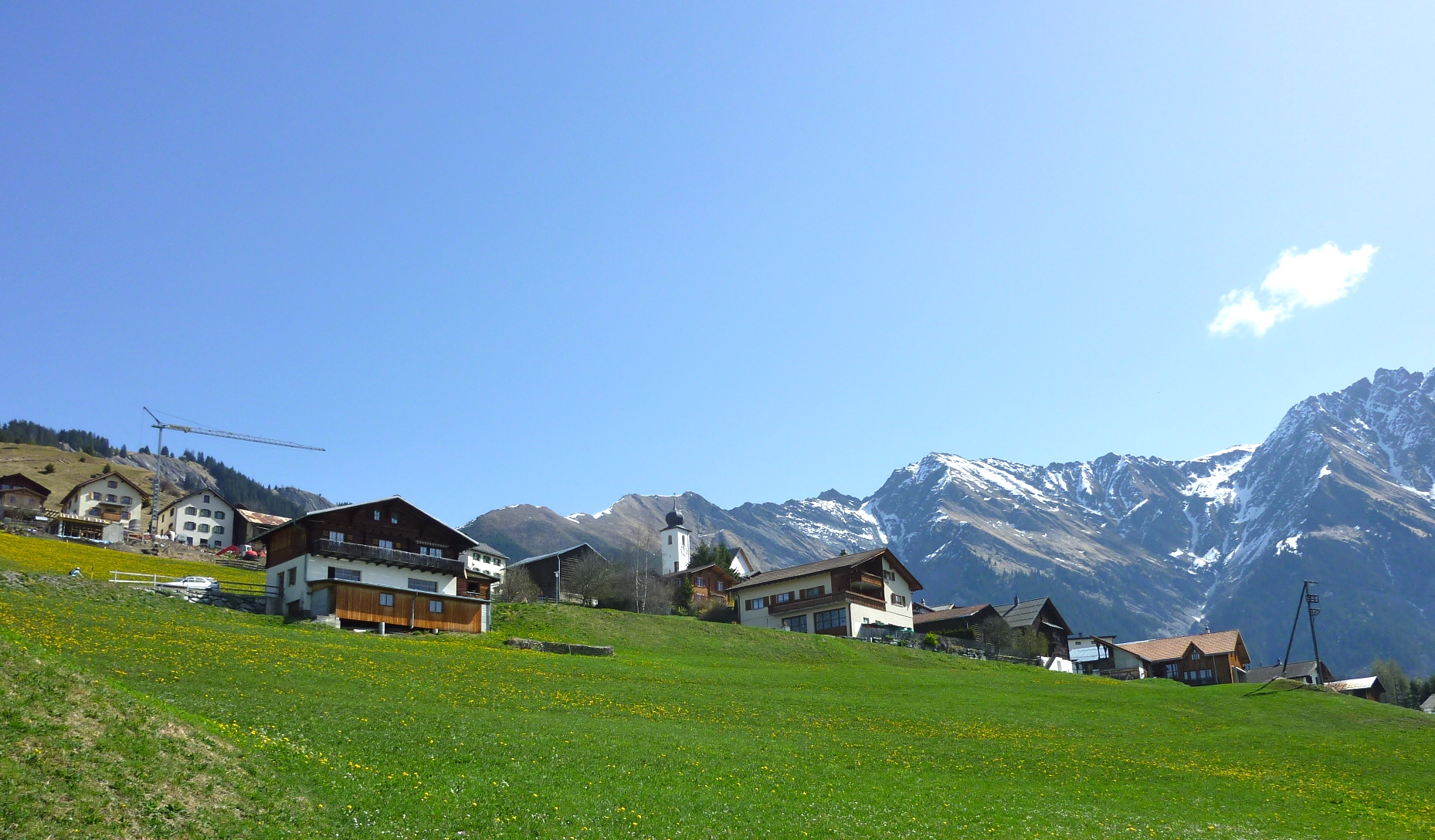

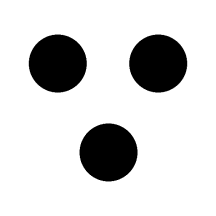
- Flag Coat of arms
- Location of Riein
- Location within Switzerland Location within Canton of Graubünden
- Coordinates: 46°44′N 9°13′E
- Country: Switzerland
- Canton: Graubünden
- District: Surselva

Area
  - Total: 15.82 km^{2} (6.11 sq mi)
- Elevation: 1,270 m (4,170 ft)

Population (Dec 2011)
  - Total: 67
  - Density: 4.2/km^{2} (11/sq mi)
- Time zone: UTC+01:00 (CET)
  - Summer (DST): UTC+02:00 (CEST)
- Postal code: 7128
- SFOS number: 3579
- ISO 3166 code: CH-GR
- Surrounded by: Castrisch, Duvin, Pitasch, Safien, Sevgein, Tenna, Valendas
- Website: SFSO statistics

Riein (Romansh pronunciation: [ʁiˈjɛjn]) is a village and a former municipality in the district of Surselva in the canton of Graubünden in Switzerland. On 1 January 2014 the former municipalities of Riein, Castrisch, Ilanz, Ladir, Luven, Pitasch, Ruschein, Schnaus, Sevgein, Duvin, Pigniu, Rueun and Siat merged into the new municipality of Ilanz/Glion.

== History ==
Riein is first mentioned in 765 as Renino. In 960 it was mentioned as Raine.

== Geography ==
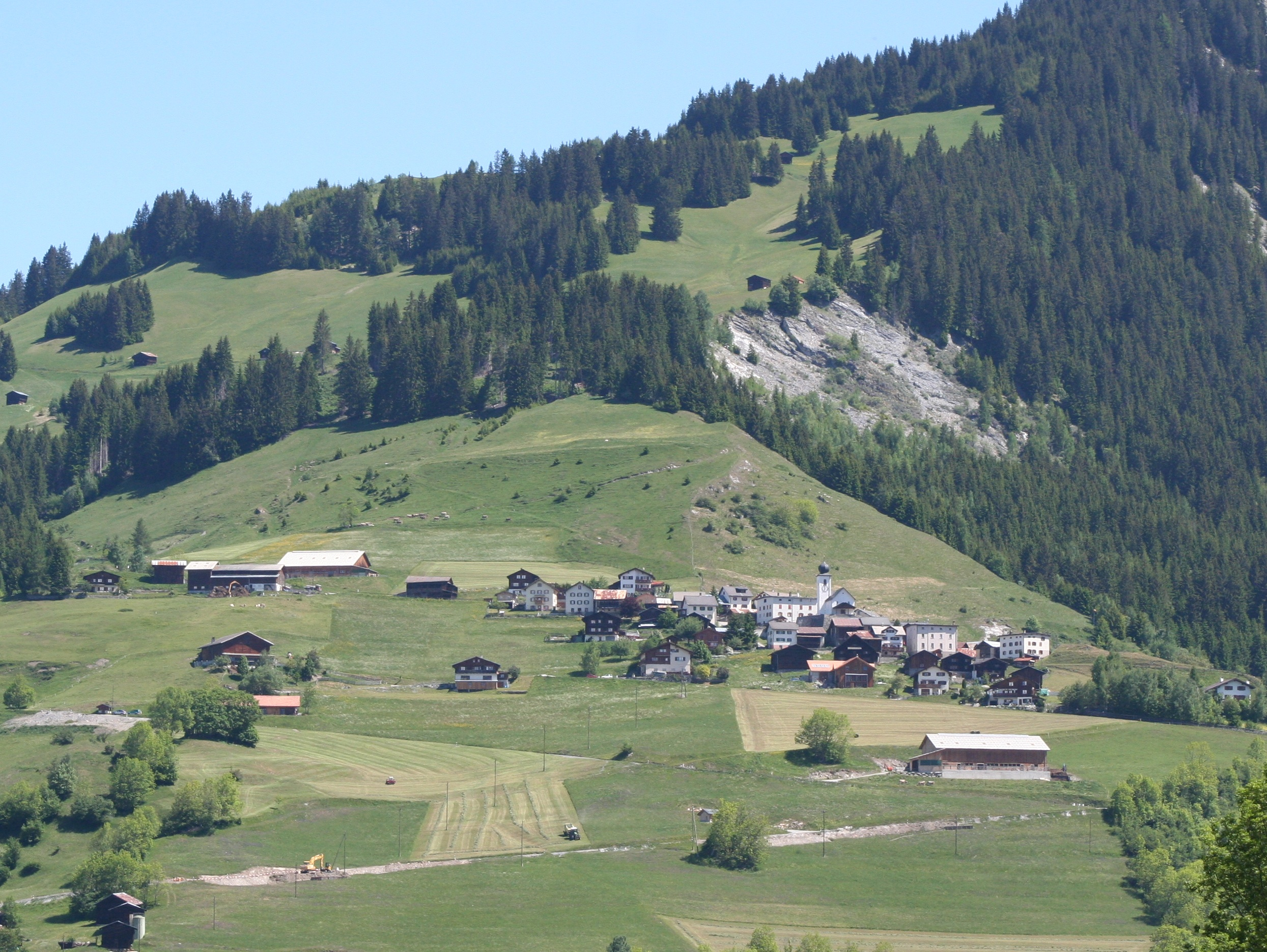
Riein in May 2009

Before the merger, Riein had a total area of 15.8 km^{2} (6.1 mi^{2}). Of this area, 21.9% is used for agricultural purposes, while 37.2% is forested. Of the rest of the land, 0.9% is settled (buildings or roads) and the remainder (39.9%) is non-productive (rivers, glaciers or mountains).

The former municipality is located in the Ilanz sub-district of the Surselva district. It is located at the entrance to the Lumnezia on a terrace east of the Glenner. It consists of the haufendorf village (an irregular, unplanned and quite closely packed village, built around a central square) of Riein and the hamlet of Signina, which joined Riein in 1904-05. Signina is separated from Reien by the Val da Riein.

== Demographics ==
Riein had a population (as of 2011) of 67. As of 2008, 1.6% of the population was made up of foreign nationals. Over the last 10 years the population has decreased at a rate of -22.2%. Most of the population (as of 2000) speaks Romansh(63.4%), with German being second most common (35.2%) and Italian being third ( 1.4%).

As of 2000, the gender distribution of the population was 45.7% male and 54.3% female. The age distribution, as of 2000, in Riein is; 6 children or 8.5% of the population are between 0 and 9 years old and 7 teenagers or 9.9% are between 10 and 19. Of the adult population, 5 people or 7.0% of the population are between 20 and 29 years old. 9 people or 12.7% are between 30 and 39, 9 people or 12.7% are between 40 and 49, and 13 people or 18.3% are between 50 and 59. The senior population distribution is 8 people or 11.3% of the population are between 60 and 69 years old, 11 people or 15.5% are between 70 and 79, there are 2 people or 2.8% who are between 80 and 89 there is 1 person who is between 90 and 99.

In the 2007 federal election the most popular party was the SVP which received 68.9% of the vote. The next three most popular parties were the FDP (23%), the CVP (4.4%) and the SP (3.7%).

In Riein about 50% of the population (between age 25-64) have completed either non-mandatory upper secondary education or additional higher education (either university or a Fachhochschule).

Riein has an unemployment rate of 0.54%. As of 2005, there were 15 people employed in the primary economic sector and about 6 businesses involved in this sector. people are employed in the secondary sector and there are businesses in this sector. 3 people are employed in the tertiary sector, with 1 business in this sector.

The historical population is given in the following table:

year	population
1850	218
1930	118
1950	126
1960	104
1970	91
1980	92
1990	89
2000	71
