= Castrisch =

- Former municipality
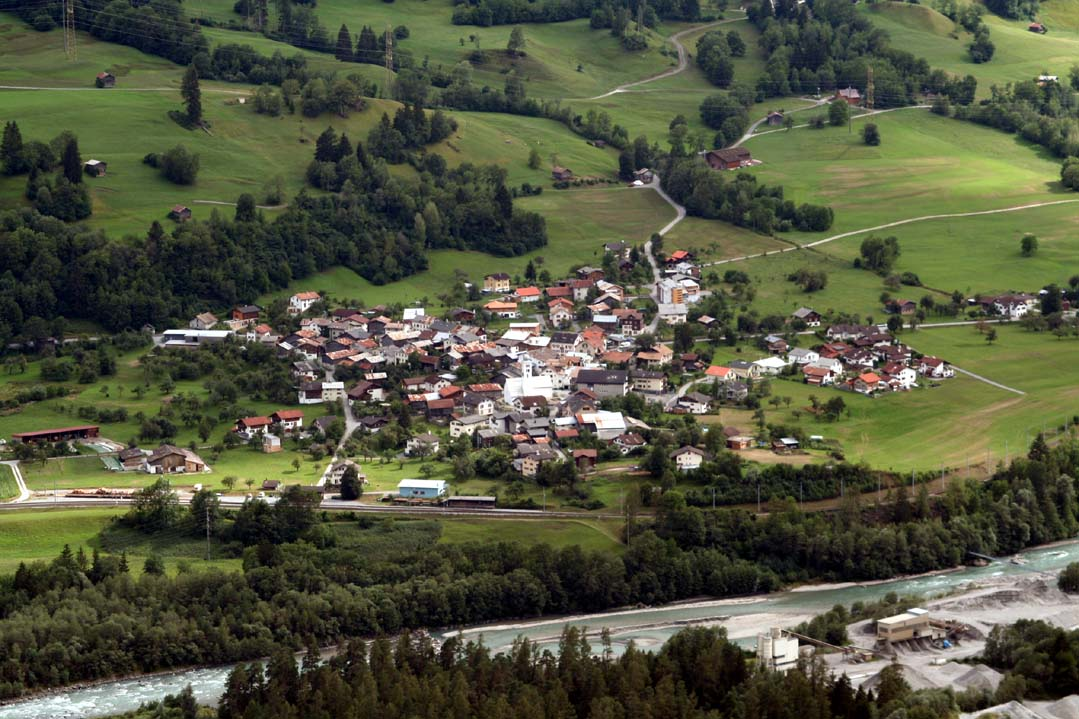

- Flag Coat of arms
- Location of Castrisch
- Location within Switzerland Location within Canton of Graubünden
- Coordinates: 46°46′N 9°13′E
- Country: Switzerland
- Canton: Graubünden
- District: Surselva

Area
  - Total: 7.19 km^{2} (2.78 sq mi)
- Elevation: 722 m (2,369 ft)

Population (Dec 2011)
  - Total: 396
  - Density: 55.1/km^{2} (143/sq mi)
- Time zone: UTC+01:00 (CET)
  - Summer (DST): UTC+02:00 (CEST)
- Postal code: 7126
- SFOS number: 3571
- ISO 3166 code: CH-GR
- Surrounded by: Ilanz, Riein, Sagogn, Schluein, Sevgein, Valendas
- Website: SFSO statistics

Castrisch ([kɐˈʃtʁiʃ]) is a former municipality in the district of Surselva in the Swiss canton of Graubünden. Until 1943, it was officially known as Kästris. On 1 January 2014 the former municipalities of Castrisch, Ilanz, Ladir, Luven, Pitasch, Riein, Ruschein, Schnaus, Sevgein, Duvin, Pigniu, Rueun and Siat merged into the new municipality of Ilanz/Glion.

== History ==
Castrisch is first mentioned in 765 as Castrices.

== Geography ==
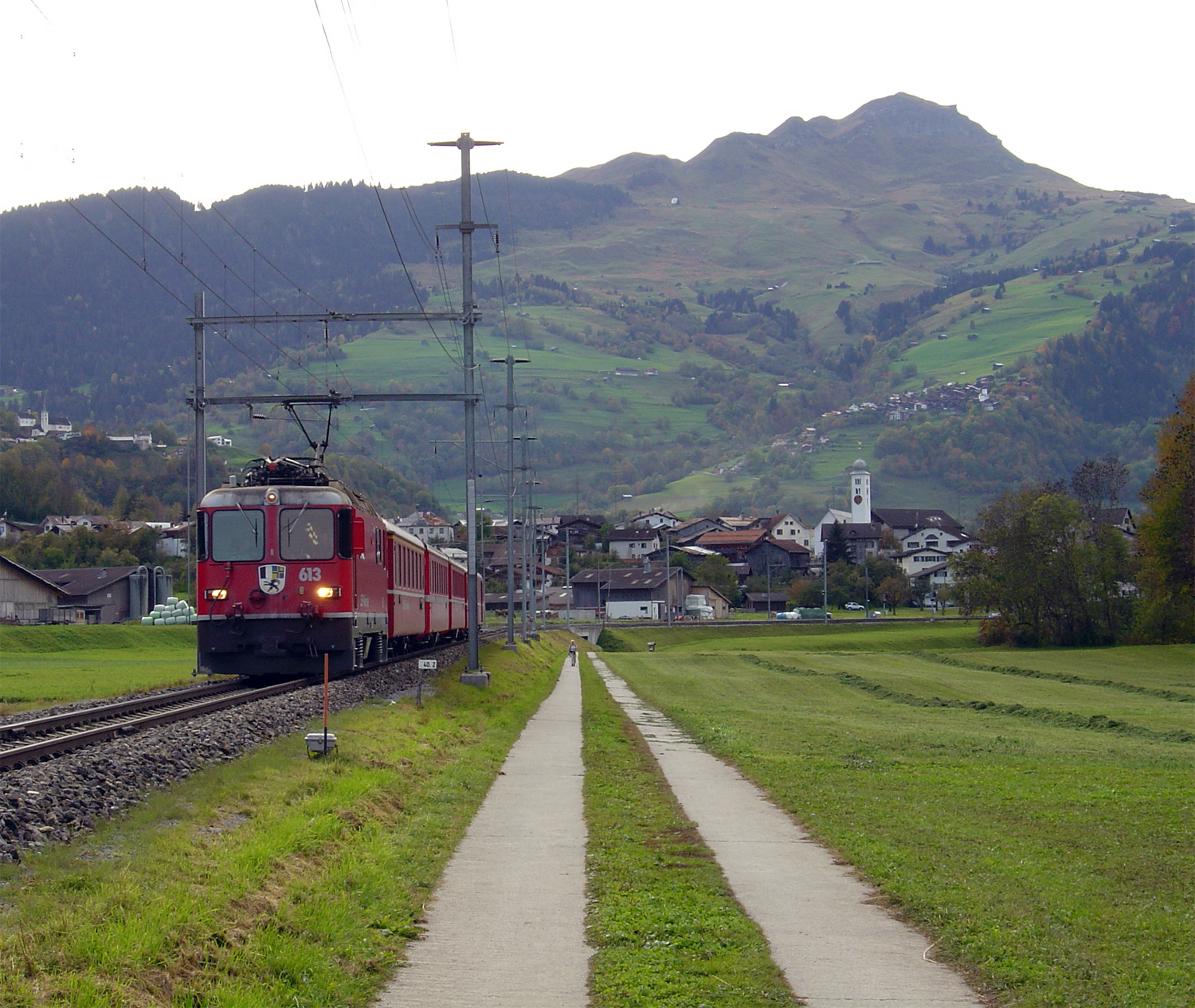
Railroad line out of Castrisch

Aerial view (1954)

Before the merger, Castrisch had a total area of 7.2 km^{2} (2.8 mi^{2}). Of this area, 40.8% is used for agricultural purposes, while 51.3% is forested. Of the rest of the land, 3.3% is settled (buildings or roads) and the remainder (4.6%) is non-productive (rivers, glaciers or mountains).

The former municipality is located in the Ilanz sub-district of the Surselva district. It lies on the old route over the Vorderrhein river and on the route from Schluein to Safien. Until 1943 Castrisch was known by its German name as Kästris.

== Demographics ==
Castrisch had a population (as of 2011) of 396. As of 2008, 2.9% of the population was made up of foreign nationals. Over the last 10 years the population has decreased at a rate of -1.9%. Most of the population (as of 2000) speaks Romansh(48.5%), with German being second most common (48.1%) and Spanish being third ( 1.2%).

As of 2000, the gender distribution of the population was 51.0% male and 49.0% female. The age distribution, as of 2000, in Castrisch is; 53 children or 12.9% of the population are between 0 and 9 years old and 66 teenagers or 16.0% are between 10 and 19. Of the adult population, 39 people or 9.5% of the population are between 20 and 29 years old. 59 people or 14.3% are between 30 and 39, 81 people or 19.7% are between 40 and 49, and 33 people or 8.0% are between 50 and 59. The senior population distribution is 29 people or 7.0% of the population are between 60 and 69 years old, 23 people or 5.6% are between 70 and 79, there are 26 people or 6.3% who are between 80 and 89 there are 3 people or 0.7% who are between 90 and 99.

In the 2007 federal election the most popular party was the SVP which received 37.9% of the vote. The next three most popular parties were the SP (28.4%), the CVP (17.5%) and the FDP (12.1%).

The entire Swiss population is generally well educated. In Castrisch about 69% of the population (between age 25-64) have completed either non-mandatory upper secondary education or additional higher education (either University or a Fachhochschule).

Castrisch has an unemployment rate of 1.27%. As of 2005, there were 22 people employed in the primary economic sector and about 8 businesses involved in this sector. 13 people are employed in the secondary sector and there are 5 businesses in this sector. 33 people are employed in the tertiary sector, with 8 businesses in this sector.

The historical population is given in the following table:

year	population
1850	469
1900	469
1950	362
1990	337
2000	412
