= Schnaus =

- Former municipality
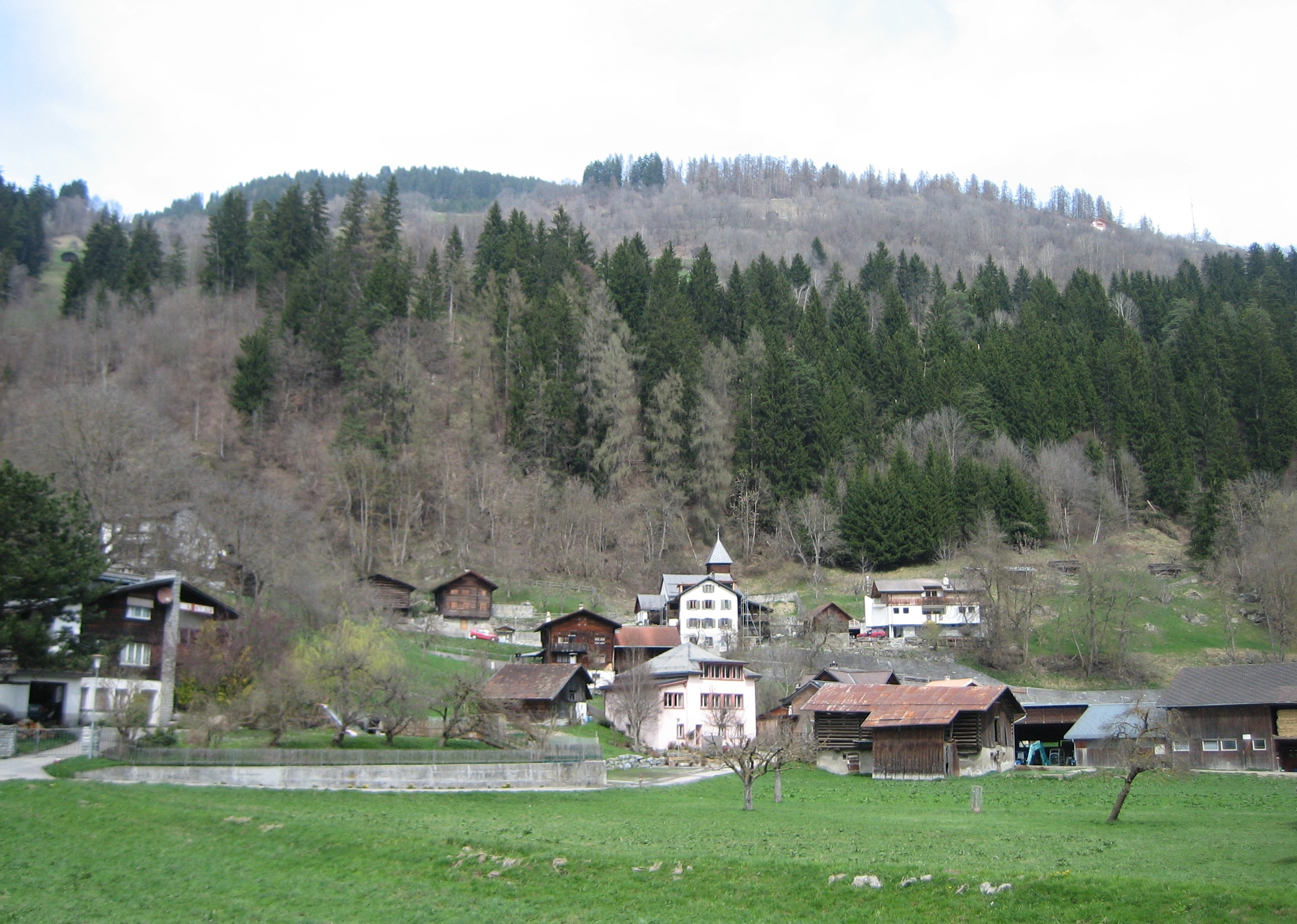

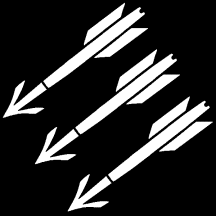
- Flag Coat of arms
- Location of Schnaus
- Location within Switzerland Location within Canton of Graubünden
- Coordinates: 46°46′N 9°10′E
- Country: Switzerland
- Canton: Graubünden
- District: Surselva

Area
  - Total: 2.99 km^{2} (1.15 sq mi)
- Elevation: 720 m (2,360 ft)

Population (Dec 2011)
  - Total: 123
  - Density: 41.1/km^{2} (107/sq mi)
- Time zone: UTC+01:00 (CET)
  - Summer (DST): UTC+02:00 (CEST)
- Postal code: 7130
- SFOS number: 3583
- ISO 3166 code: CH-GR
- Surrounded by: Falera, Ilanz, Ladir, Rueun, Ruschein, Siat
- Website: SFSO statistics

Schnaus is a former municipality in the district of Surselva in the Swiss canton of Graubünden. On 1 January 2014 the former municipalities of Schnaus, Castrisch, Ilanz, Ladir, Luven, Pitasch, Riein, Ruschein, Sevgein, Duvin, Pigniu, Rueun and Siat merged into the new municipality of Ilanz/Glion.

== History ==
Schnaus is first mentioned about 840 as Scanaues.

== Geography ==
Before the merger, Schnaus had a total area of 3.0 km^{2} (1.2 mi^{2}). Of this area, 58.4% is used for agricultural purposes, while 30.9% is forested. Of the rest of the land, 2.3% is settled (buildings or roads) and the remainder (8.4%) is non-productive (rivers, glaciers or mountains).

The former municipality is located in the Ilanz sub-district of the Surselva district. It consists of the village of Schnaus above the Vorderrhein and the exclave of Alp da Schnaus eastward above the Val da Siat.

== Demographics ==
Schnaus had a population (as of 2011) of 123. As of 2008, 17.6% of the population was made up of foreign nationals. Over the last 10 years the population has grown at a rate of 43%. Most of the population (as of 2000) speaks Romansh (45.5%), with German being second most common (40.4%) and Serbo-Croatian being third (11.1%).

As of 2000, the gender distribution of the population was 57.9% male and 42.1% female. The age distribution, as of 2000, in Schnaus is; 17 children or 17.2% of the population are between 0 and 9 years old and 14 teenagers or 14.1% are between 10 and 19. Of the adult population, 4 people or 4.0% of the population are between 20 and 29 years old. 21 people or 21.2% are between 30 and 39, 14 people or 14.1% are between 40 and 49, and 11 people or 11.1% are between 50 and 59. The senior population distribution is 9 people or 9.1% of the population are between 60 and 69 years old, 8 people or 8.1% are between 70 and 79, there is 1 person who is between 80 and 89.

In the 2007 federal election the most popular party was the SVP which received 46.7% of the vote. The next three most popular parties were the CVP (21.3%), the FDP (16.7%) and the SP (15.3%).

In Schnaus about 57.7% of the population (between age 25-64) have completed either non-mandatory upper secondary education or additional higher education (either university or a Fachhochschule).

Schnaus has an unemployment rate of 4.89%. As of 2005, there were 12 people employed in the primary economic sector and about 5 businesses involved in this sector. 2 people are employed in the secondary sector and there is 1 business in this sector. 10 people are employed in the tertiary sector, with 3 businesses in this sector.

The historical population is given in the following table:

year	population
1850	126
1900	123
1950	134
1990	79
2000	99
