= Ruschein =

- Former municipality
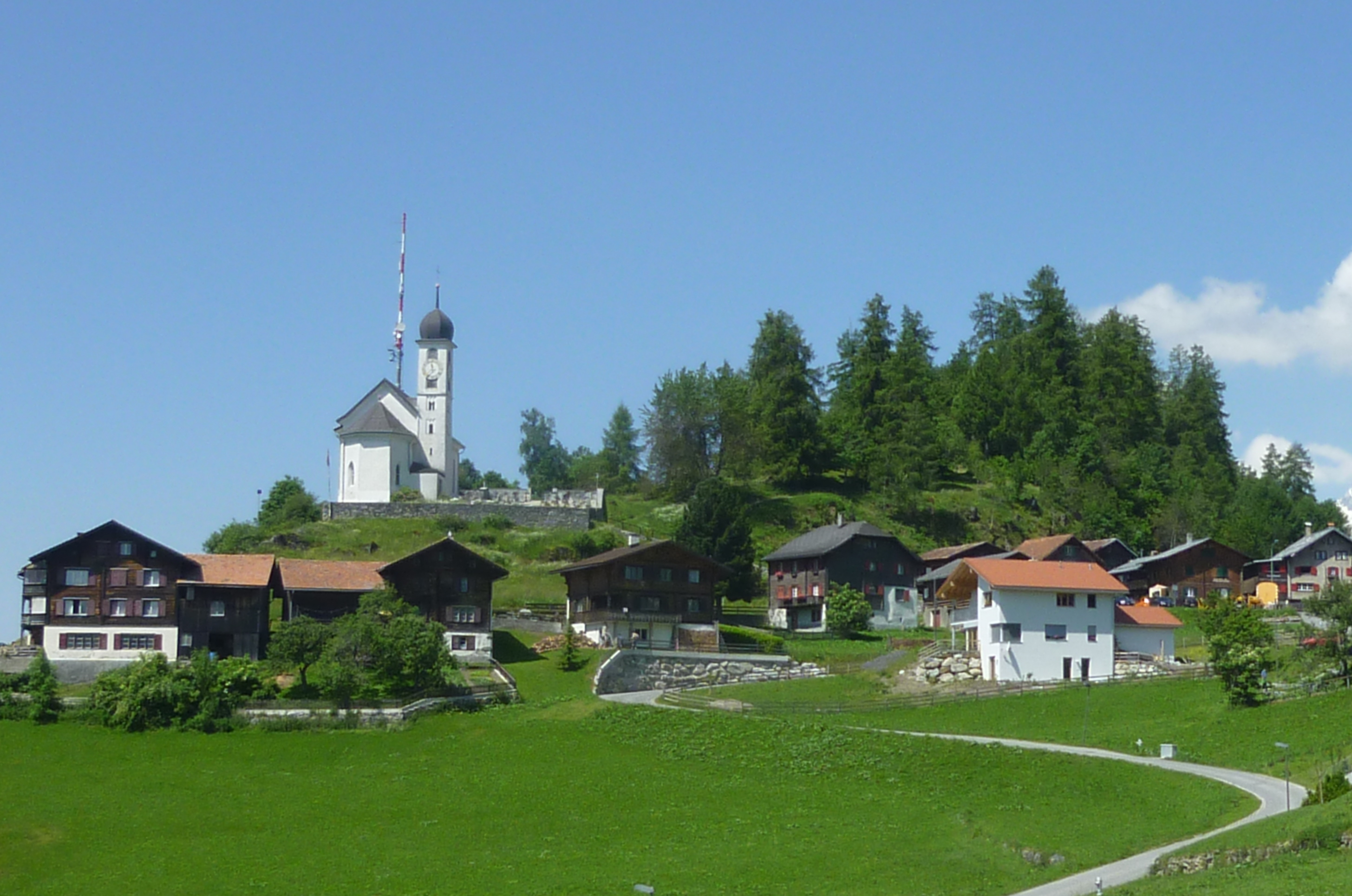

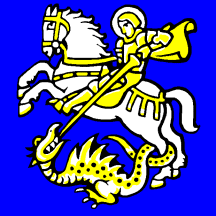
- Flag Coat of arms
- Location of Ruschein
- Location within Switzerland Location within Canton of Graubünden
- Coordinates: 46°47′N 9°11′E
- Country: Switzerland
- Canton: Graubünden
- District: Surselva

Area
  - Total: 12.54 km^{2} (4.84 sq mi)
- Elevation: 1,155 m (3,789 ft)

Population (Dec 2011)
  - Total: 345
  - Density: 27.5/km^{2} (71.3/sq mi)
- Time zone: UTC+01:00 (CET)
  - Summer (DST): UTC+02:00 (CEST)
- Postal code: 7154
- SFOS number: 3580
- ISO 3166 code: CH-GR
- Surrounded by: Falera, Glarus Süd (GL), Ilanz, Laax, Ladir, Schluein, Schnaus, Siat
- Website: www.ruschein.ch

Ruschein (German: [ˈʁuːʃaɪn], Romansh: [ʁuˈʒɛjn]) is a former municipality in the district of Surselva in the canton of Graubünden in Switzerland. Its official language is the Sursilvan dialect of Romansh. On 1 January 2014 the former municipalities of Ruschein, Castrisch, Ilanz, Ladir, Luven, Pitasch, Riein, Schnaus, Sevgein, Duvin, Pigniu, Rueun and Siat merged into the new municipality of Ilanz/Glion.

== History ==
Ruschein is first mentioned in 765 as Rucene.

== Geography ==
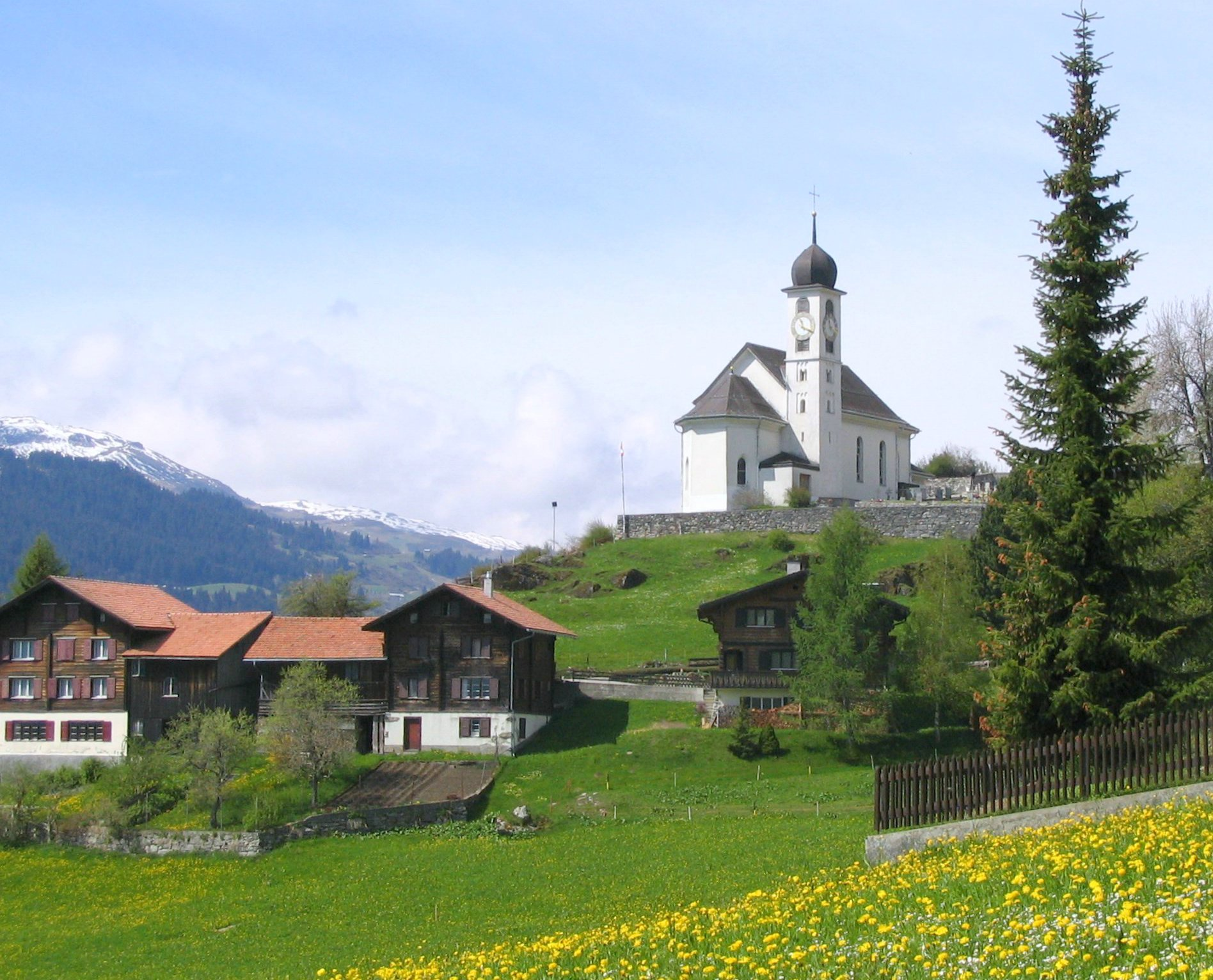
Ruschein village and Church of S.Gieri

Before the merger, Ruschein had a total area of 12.5 km^{2} (4.8 mi^{2}). Of this area, 43.1% is used for agricultural purposes, while 25.8% is forested. Of the rest of the land, 3% is settled (buildings or roads) and the remainder (28.2%) is non-productive (rivers, glaciers or mountains).

The former municipality is located in the Ilanz sub-district of the Surselva district. It is located on a terrace on the northern Vorderrhein valley wall. It consists of the village of Ruschein and the alpine herding settlement of Alp da Ruschein in the furthest Val da Siat.

== Demographics ==
Ruschein had a population (as of 2011) of 345. As of 2008, 4.9% of the population was made up of foreign nationals. Over the last 10 years the population has decreased at a rate of -4.2%. Most of the population (as of 2000) speaks Romansh(69.4%), with German being second most common (26.7%) and Albanian being third ( 1.4%).

As of 2000, the gender distribution of the population was 44.1% male and 55.9% female. The age distribution, as of 2000, in Ruschein is; 42 children or 11.8% of the population are between 0 and 9 years old and 48 teenagers or 13.5% are between 10 and 19. Of the adult population, 25 people or 7.0% of the population are between 20 and 29 years old. 62 people or 17.4% are between 30 and 39, 49 people or 13.8% are between 40 and 49, and 33 people or 9.3% are between 50 and 59. The senior population distribution is 41 people or 11.5% of the population are between 60 and 69 years old, 30 people or 8.4% are between 70 and 79, there are 26 people or 7.3% who are between 80 and 89.

In the 2007 federal election the most popular party was the CVP which received 43.6% of the vote. The next three most popular parties were the SVP (29.2%), the FDP (17.5%) and the SP (9.5%).

In Ruschein about 70.4% of the population (between age 25–64) have completed either non-mandatory upper secondary education or additional higher education (either university or a Fachhochschule).

Ruschein has an unemployment rate of 1.62%. As of 2005, there were 29 people employed in the primary economic sector and about 14 businesses involved in this sector. 11 people are employed in the secondary sector and there are 4 businesses in this sector. 24 people are employed in the tertiary sector, with 10 businesses in this sector.

The historical population is given in the following table:

year	population
1850	245
1940	327
1980	283
1990	342
2000	356
