= Nadine G. Barlow =

American astronomer (1958–2020)

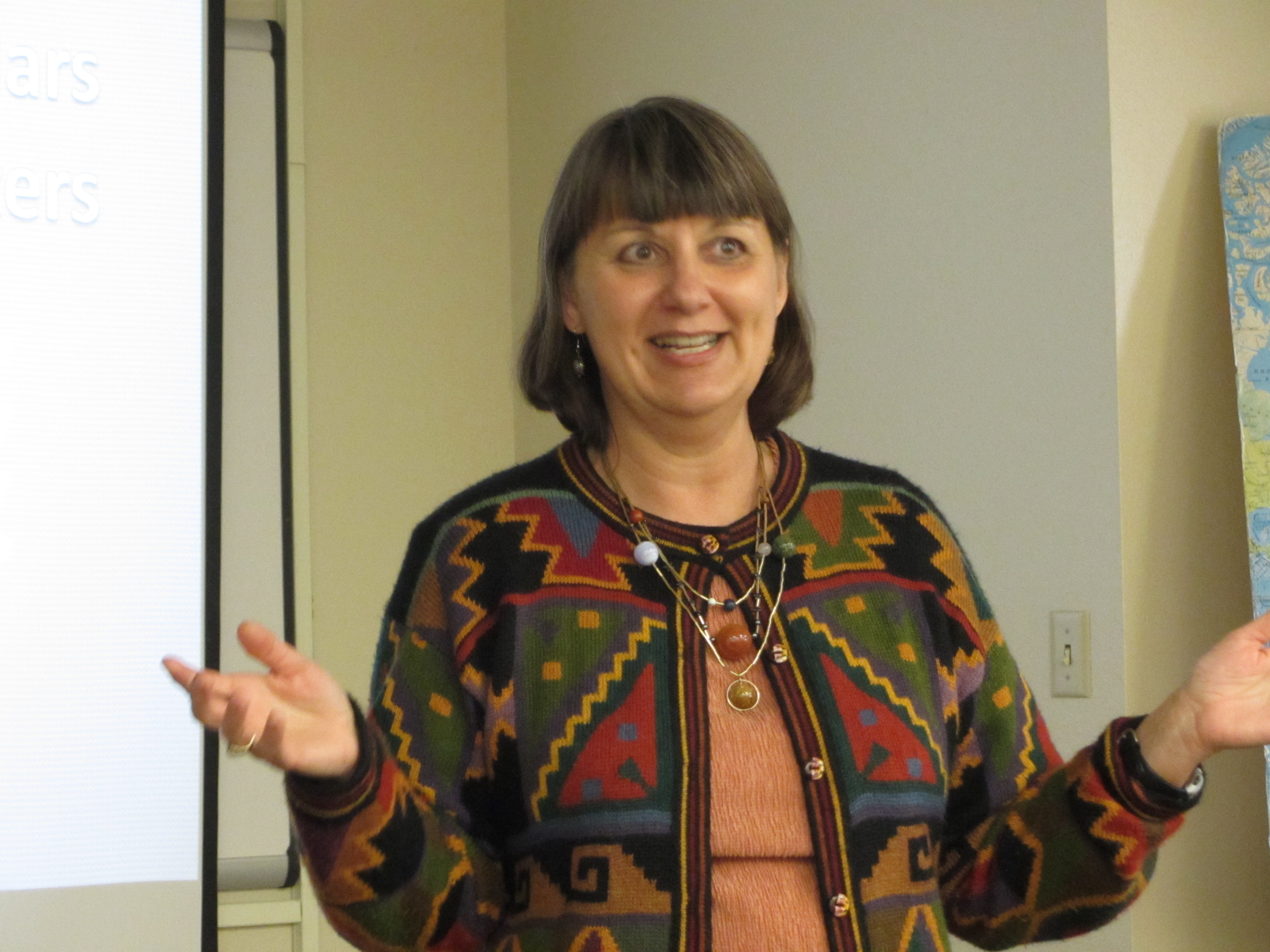
- Born: 1958; La Jolla, California
- Died: August 17, 2020 (aged 61–62)
- Education: University of Arizona
- Scientific career
- Fields: Planetary science
- Workplaces: Lunar and Planetary Institute; NASA; University of Central Florida; Northern Arizona University
- Doctoral advisor: Robert G. Strom

Nadine Gail Barlow (1958–2020) was an American planetary scientist. She was a professor in the Department of Physics and Astronomy at Northern Arizona University (NAU). She became Associate Chair of the NAU Department of Physics and Astronomy in Fall 2010. She was also the director of the Northern Arizona University/NASA Space Grant Program and an associate director of the Arizona Space Grant Consortium.

== Career ==
During her career, Barlow taught at Palomar College, University of Houston–Clear Lake, University of Central Florida (UCF), and NAU, where she was on staff until the time of her death. She also conducted research at the NASA Johnson Space Center, the Lunar and Planetary Institute, and the United States Geological Survey (USGS) Astrogeology Science Center in Flagstaff. She served as the first director of the UCF Robinson Observatory in Orlando.

Barlow worked on a number of NASA lunar and planetary science projects, including:

- Detailed Investigations of Martian Central Pit Craters
- Investigating Indicators of Volatile-Rich Material in Arabia Terra, Mars
- Geographic Information Systems (GIS) Database of Lunar Impact Craters
- Morphologic Analysis of Impact Craters on Ganymede
- GIS Database and Tools for Martian Impact Craters
- Investigations of Martian Impact Crater Morphologies and Morphometries

She was considered to be one of the top Mars scholars in the world.

Barlow died on August 17, 2020, from ovarian cancer.

== Awards and honors ==
Barlow received the University of Central Florida Excellence in Undergraduate Teaching Award in 2002 and the Palomar Community College Alumna of the Year Award for 2002–2003. In 1999 she was awarded the asteroid name 15466 Barlow by the International Astronomical Union (IAU) in her honor.

== Selected works ==
- Mars: An Introduction to its Interior, Surface, and Atmosphere ISBN 978-0521852265 (2008)
- Space Sciences ISBN 002865546X (co-editor, 2002)
- Encyclopedia of Earth Sciences ISBN 0028830008 (co-editor, 1996)
