= Power of the Pen =

Power of the Pen logo

Power of the Pen is an interscholastic writing league founded by Lorraine B. Merrill in 1986. It is a non-profit creative writing program for students in grades seven and eight in the U.S. state of Ohio.

== Participation ==
Power of the Pen is only in the state of Ohio. More than 200 school districts compete, each starting off with teams of twelve students, six from each grade.

== Qualification and Tournaments ==
In most schools, students who want to join the Power of the Pen team participate in one or more tryout sessions, in which they are given a prompt that they must base an essay or short story within 40 minutes. After the allotted time, each story is given to the coach, who evaluates the writing and chooses students who they think are best for the team based on their writing skills.

The teams compete in three different tournaments: a District, Regional, and State tournament. As the team progresses, more and more members may be eliminated based on their scores in the previous tournament's submissions.
