= Wisconsin H-Alpha Mapper =

Telescope in northern Chile

- Alternative names: WHAM
- Location: Coquimbo Region, Chile
- Coordinates: 30°10′05″S 70°48′12″W
- Diameter: 0.6 m (2 ft 0 in)
- Location within Chile
- Related media on Commons

The Wisconsin H-Alpha Mapper (WHAM) is a custom-built 0.6 metres (24 in) telescope operated by the University of Wisconsin–Madison, used to study the Hydrogen-alpha ions of the warm ionized medium. It is a tenant telescope at the Cerro Tololo Inter-American Observatory (CTIO), in the Coquimbo Region of northern Chile.

== History ==
First interest in the ionised hydrogen of the interstellar medium came when Ron Reynolds pointed a spectrometer through a makeshift observing portal in an office of the University of Wisconsin-Madison's Physical Sciences Laboratory during the late 1970s. Reynolds and colleagues, including Matt Haffner, a senior scientist in UW-M's astronomy department, later developed WHAM.

WHAM formally began life at Kitt Peak National Observatory (KPNO) in November 1996, using the flat mirrors of a two-axis, all-sky siderostat passing light horizontally through a 0.6 m diameter, 8.6 m focal length objective lens into a 2.5 m x 2.5 m x 6 m trailer that contained the spectrometer, that used a low noise, high efficiency CCD camera as a multichannel detector behind a pair of 15 centimetres (5.9 in) diameter Fabry-Perot etalons/spectrometers. The system was automated, so that the entire WHAM facility, including opening and closing at the beginning and end of the observing night, was operated from a campus office at the University of Wisconsin in Madison. It operated there from 1996 to 2008.

In 2009, WHAM was moved from KPNO to CTIO.

WHAM's field of view allows a whole sky survey in about 2 years. WHAM mapped the details of the Reynolds Layer.

== See also ==
- List of astronomical observatories
