= NGC 285 =

Lenticular galaxy in the constellation Cetus

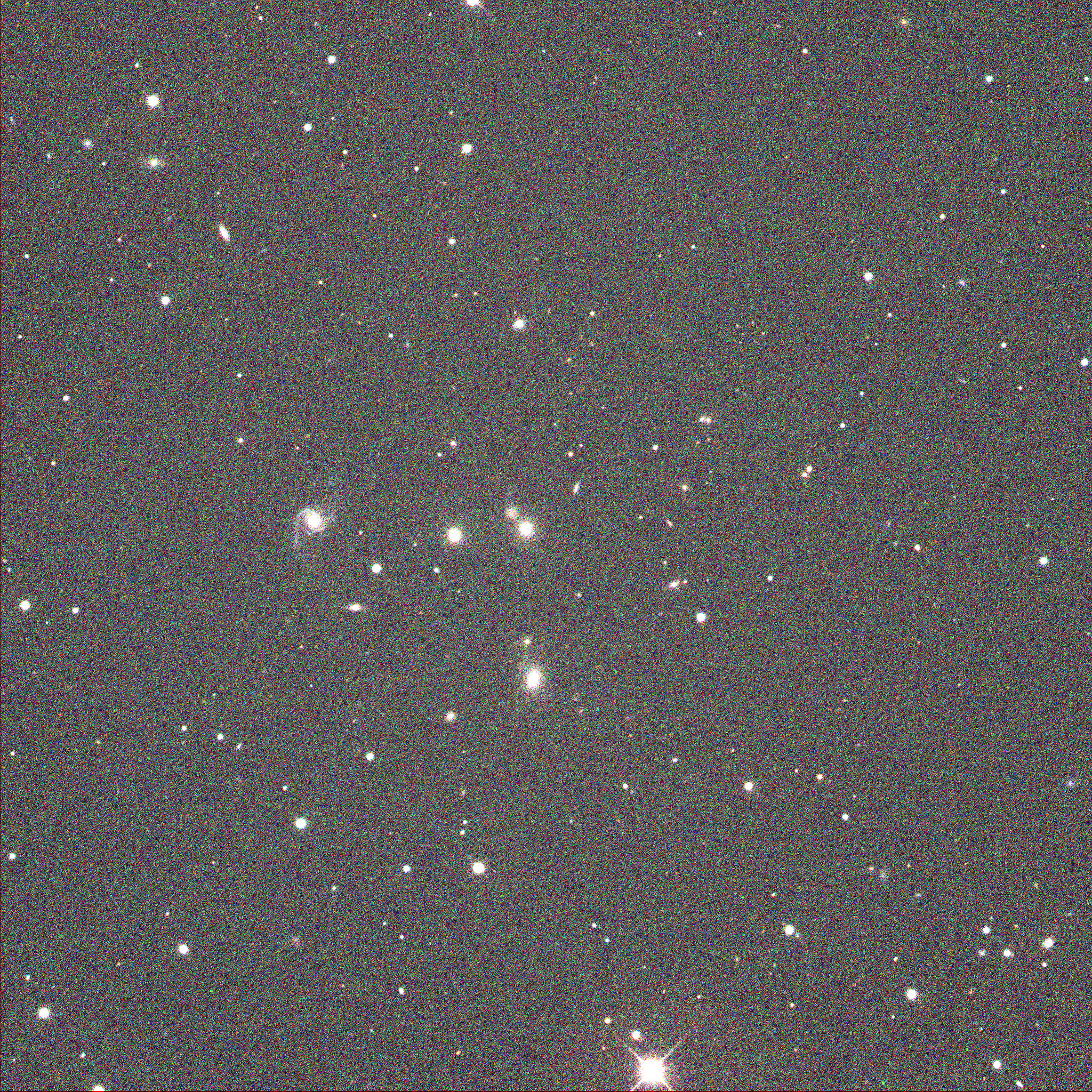
- NGC 285 as taken by the PROMPT 1 Telescope

Observation data (J2000 epoch)
- Constellation: Cetus
- Right ascension: 00^{h} 53^{m} 29.9^{s}
- Declination: −13° 09′ 39″
- Redshift: 0.037976
- Heliocentric radial velocity: 11,385 km/s
- Apparent magnitude (V): 15

Characteristics
- Type: (R'?)S0^{−}
- Apparent size (V): 0.7' × 0.7'

Other designations
- MCG -02-03-033, 2MASX J00532985-1309381, PGC 3141.

NGC 285 is a lenticular galaxy in the constellation Cetus. It was discovered on October 2, 1886, by Francis Leavenworth.
