= Cerro Pachón =

Mountain in Chile

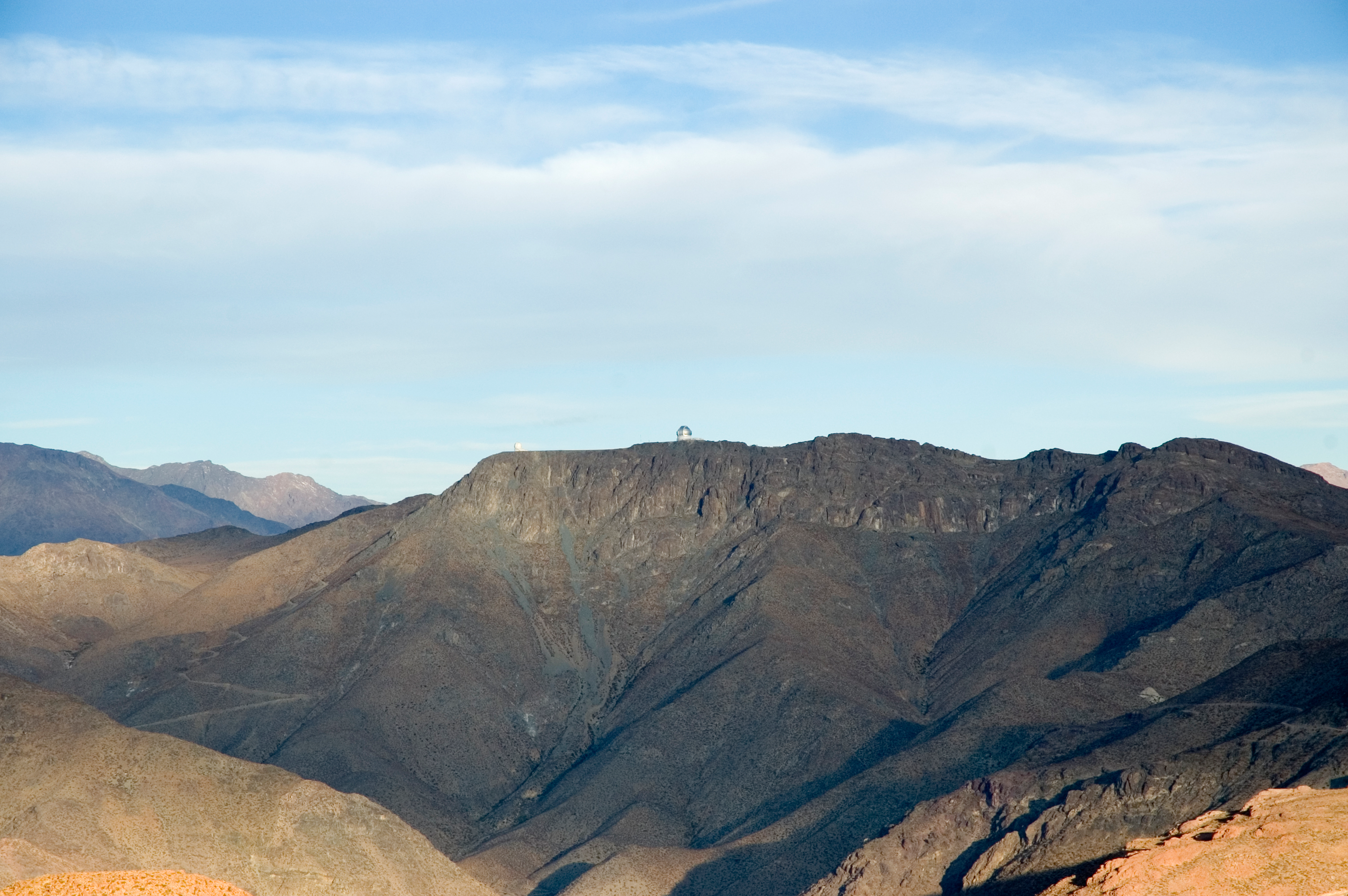
- The SOuthern Astrophysical Research Telescope (SOAR) and Gemini South telecopes on Cerro Pachón as seen from Cerro Tololo in June of 2006.

Highest point
- Elevation: 2,682 m (8,799 ft)
- Coordinates: 30°14′16.41″S 70°44′01.11″W

Geography
- Location within Chile
- Country: Chile

Cerro Pachón is a mountain in central Chile, located east of the city of La Serena in the Coquimbo Region. The mountain is seismically active, with a magnitude 5.6 earthquake impacting the summit on April 30, 2012. Along with Cerro Tololo, this mountain forms part of the surrounding El Totoral Reserve that is owned by the Association of Universities for Research in Astronomy (AURA) Observatory. It is the site of the 8.1 m Gemini South Telescope of the Gemini Observatory, the 4.1 m SOAR optical imager, and the 8.4 m Vera C. Rubin Observatory.

The mountain site has arid, desert conditions with cacti, shrubs, and wildflowers dotting the landscape. It is host to fauna that include Andean condor, viscachas, and the occasional fox, as well as typical desert species such as lizards, snakes, spiders, and scorpions. There is a rock art site thought to associated with the El Molle culture, 300 BC to 800 AD.

== Observatories ==
Starting in 1964, Cerro Morado and Cerro Pachón were the subject of routine observations of seeing conditions. Known as astronomical seeing monitors (ASM), these were operated by the Carnegie Institution of Washington.

In 1989, site planning was begun by the National Optical Astronomy Observatory to select two sites for a proposed pair of 8 m telescopes, one in the northern hemisphere and the other in the south. The first telescope would be located on Mauna Kea in Hawaii, while the second would be at the Cerro Tololo Inter-American Observatory (CTIO), possibly on Cerro Pachón. It is the highest peak within the CTIO boundary, rising some 500 m higher than the nearby peaks of Cerro Tololo and Cerro Morado. A site survey showed that the seeing conditions on Cerro Pachón rivalled that on Mauna Kea, and it was chosen as the site for the Gemini South observatory. First light for the newly-commissioned telescope took place on January 18, 2002.

The Andes Lidar Observatory was constructed on Cerro Pachón by the University of Illinois and saw first light in 2009. This is an upper atmosphere facility that is supported by the National Science Foundation. It uses ground-based remote sensing instruments to study the atmosphere, particularly between altitudes of 80 to 110 km.

The Vera C. Rubin Observatory is located on El Peñon (The Rock), the southernmost summit of Cerro Pachón. It was selected as the site for the Large Synoptic Survey Telescope in May 2006, beating out the alternative Sierra de San Pedro Mártir site. First light images were released 23 June 2025.

== Gallery ==
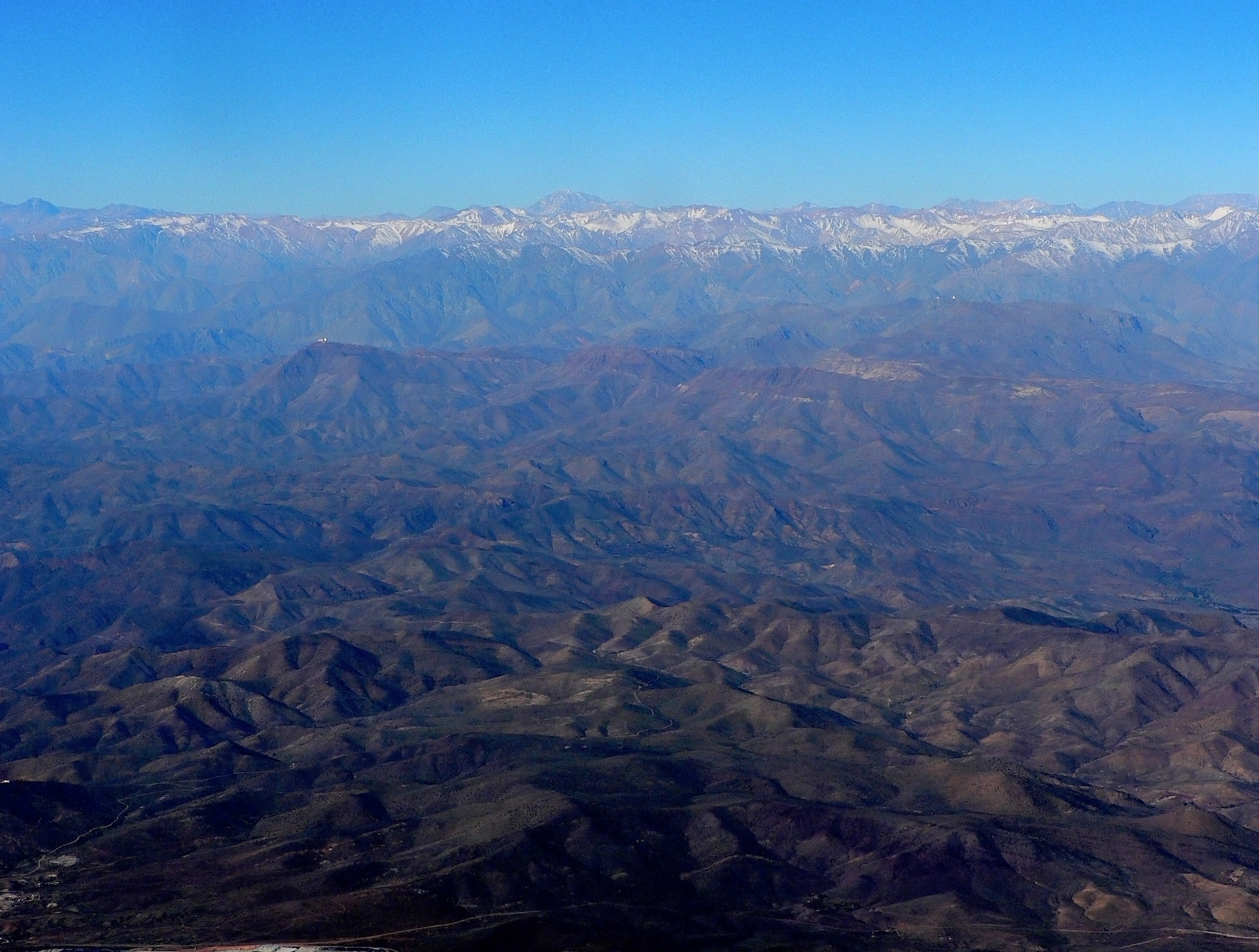
Wide view observatories from the air, including Cerro Pachón. In the distance are the Andes

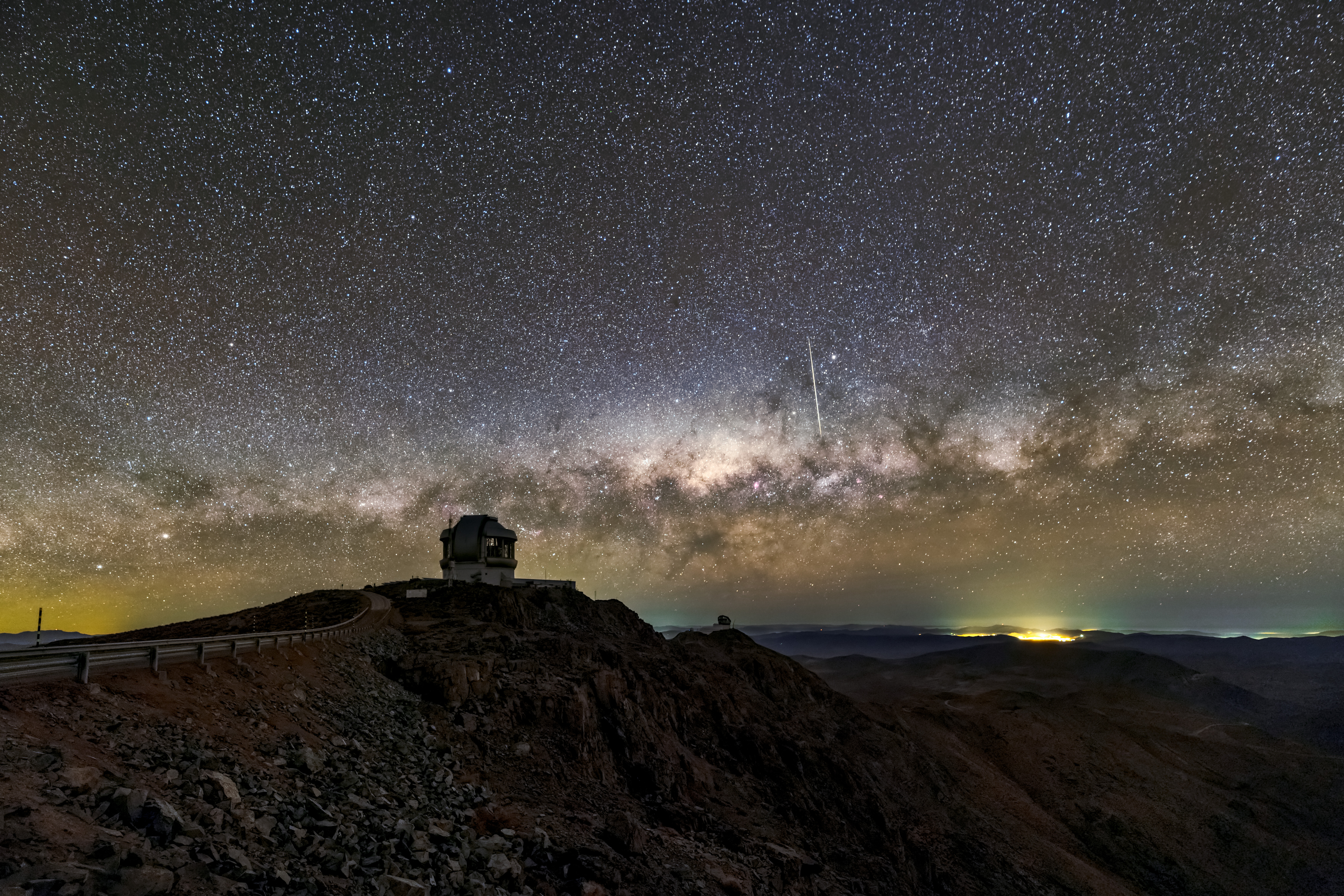
A night view of the Gemini South, the southern half of the international Gemini Observatory on Cerro Pachón with the Milky Way and streak of light left by a meteor in the background.

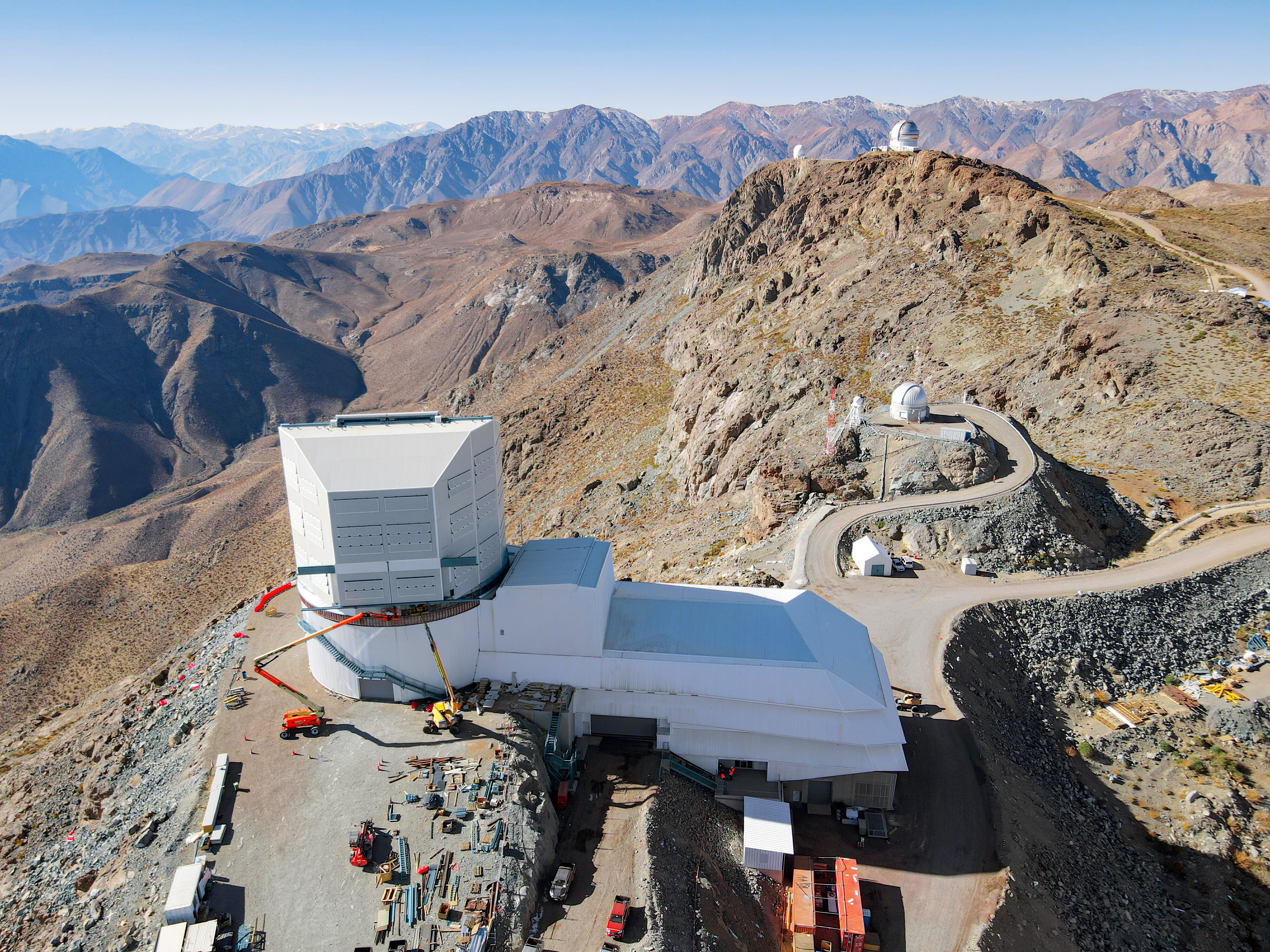
Vera C. Rubin Observatory, showing the access road atop Cerro Pachón

== See also ==
- List of astronomical observatories
