= NGC 286 =

Galaxy in the constellation Cetus

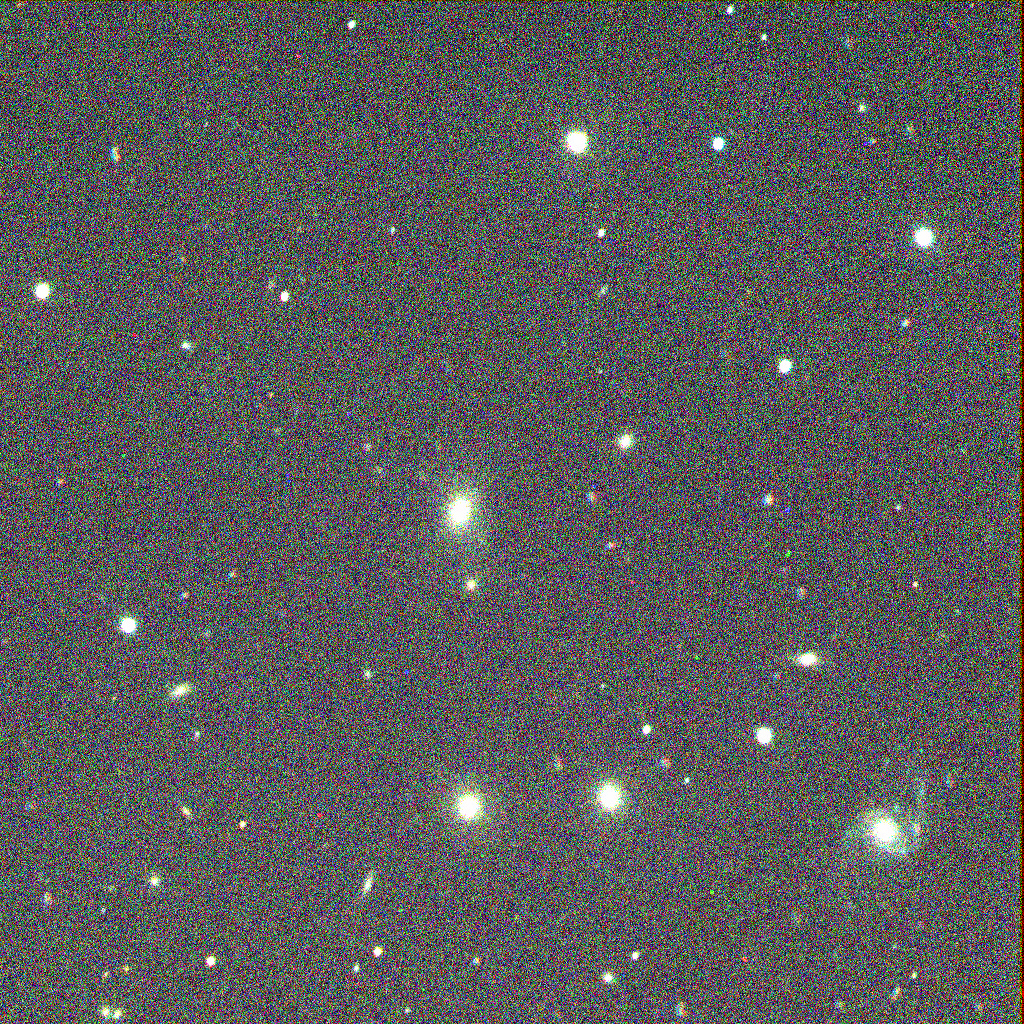
- NGC 286 as taken by the PROMPT 1 Telescope

Observation data (J2000 epoch)
- Constellation: Cetus
- Right ascension: 00^{h} 53^{m} 30.4^{s}
- Declination: −13° 06′ 46″
- Redshift: 0.036278
- Heliocentric radial velocity: 10,876 km/s
- Apparent magnitude (V): 14.99

Characteristics
- Type: S0
- Apparent size (V): 1.3' × 0.9'

Other designations
- MCG -02-03-034, 2MASX J00533032-1306461, 6dF J0053303-130646, PGC 3142.

NGC 286 is a lenticular galaxy in the constellation Cetus. It was discovered on October 2, 1886 by Francis Leavenworth.
