= Evryscope =

Set of telescopes

The Evryscope
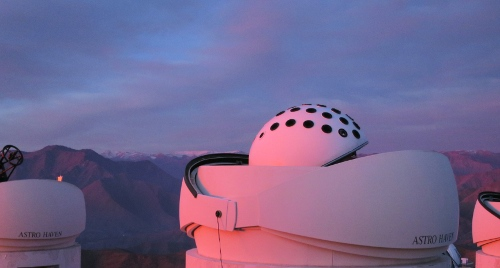
- Alternative names: Evryscope
- Location: United States, Chile
- Coordinates: Cerro Tololo: 30°10′04″S 70°48′19″W; Mount Laguna: 32°50′33″N 116°25′41″W
- Related media on Commons

The Evryscopes are a set of rapid-cadence, gigapixel-scale telescopes. Each instrument contains an array of up to 24 camera units, each consisting of a 6.1 cm (2.4 in) telescope (85 mm Rokinon DSLR lens) paired to a thermoelectrically cooled astronomical CCD. The camera units are arranged around a solid fiberglass structure to form a continuous field of view of 9216 sq. deg.

The first instrument (Evryscope-South) was deployed in May 2015 to Cerro Tololo Inter-American Observatory, where it is co-located with the PROMPT Telescopes. The second instrument (Evryscope-North) was deployed in October 2018 to Mount Laguna Observatory.

Evryscope detected the first The First Naked-Eye Superflare Detected from Proxima Centauri. In March 2016, the Evryscope observed the first superflare that was visible to the naked eye from Proxima Centauri. Proxima increased in brightness by a factor of roughly 68 times during the superflare and released a bolometric energy of 10^33.5 erg, about 10 times larger than any previously detected flare from Proxima Centauri.

Evryscope-South is funded by NSF/ATI and NSF/CAREER and was designed and built at the University of North Carolina at Chapel Hill. Evryscope-North is funded in collaboration with San Diego State University.

The Argus Array Pathfinder, a technological successor with 38 cameras, was deployed in December 2022 at PARI, North Carolina. It serves as a prototype for the Argus Array, which will be a 900 camera survey instrument and replace the CCD technology with MOSFET detectors.

== See also ==
- List of astronomical observatories
- Lists of telescopes
