= Rosemary Hill Observatory =

Observatory in Florida, US

- Organization: University of Florida
- Observatory code: 831
- Location: Bronson, Florida
- Coordinates: 29.4001°N 82.5862°W
- Altitude: 23 meters (75 ft)
- Established: 1967
- Website: Rosemary Hill Observatory

Telescopes
- A.G. Smith 30" Telescope: 0.76 m reflector
- unnamed telescope: 0.45 m reflector

Rosemary Hill Observatory (RHO) is an astronomical observatory located near the town of Bronson, Florida (USA), about 38 kilometers (24 miles) southwest of Gainesville, Florida. The observatory is owned and operated by the University of Florida, and opened in 1967. It has two telescopes and dormitories for extended observing runs.

== Telescopes ==
- A 0.76 m (30 in) Cassegrain reflector was built by Tinsley Laboratories and was commissioned in 1968. It is occasionally used for instruction, but is primarily used for monitoring active galaxies, performing photometry of transiting exoplanets, and other research purposes.
- The 0.45 m (18 in) Ritchey-Chrétien reflector was refurbished in 1994 and is used for instruction.

== See also ==
- Robinson Observatory
- List of astronomical observatories
