= RC Optical Systems =

American telescope and optics manufacturer

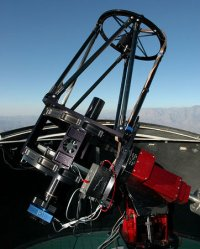
16 in (41 cm) RCOS Truss telescope, part of the PROMPT Telescopes array

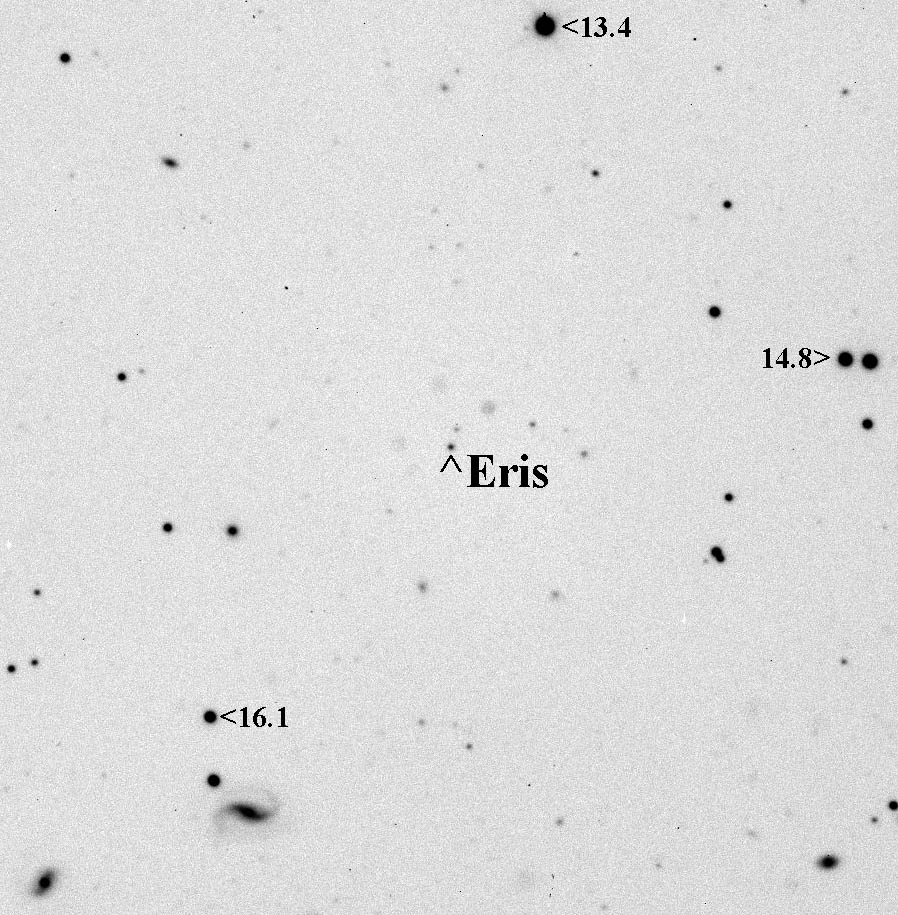
Dwarf planet Eris as seen in an 8-minute image using a RCOS 24" Ritchey-Chrétien.

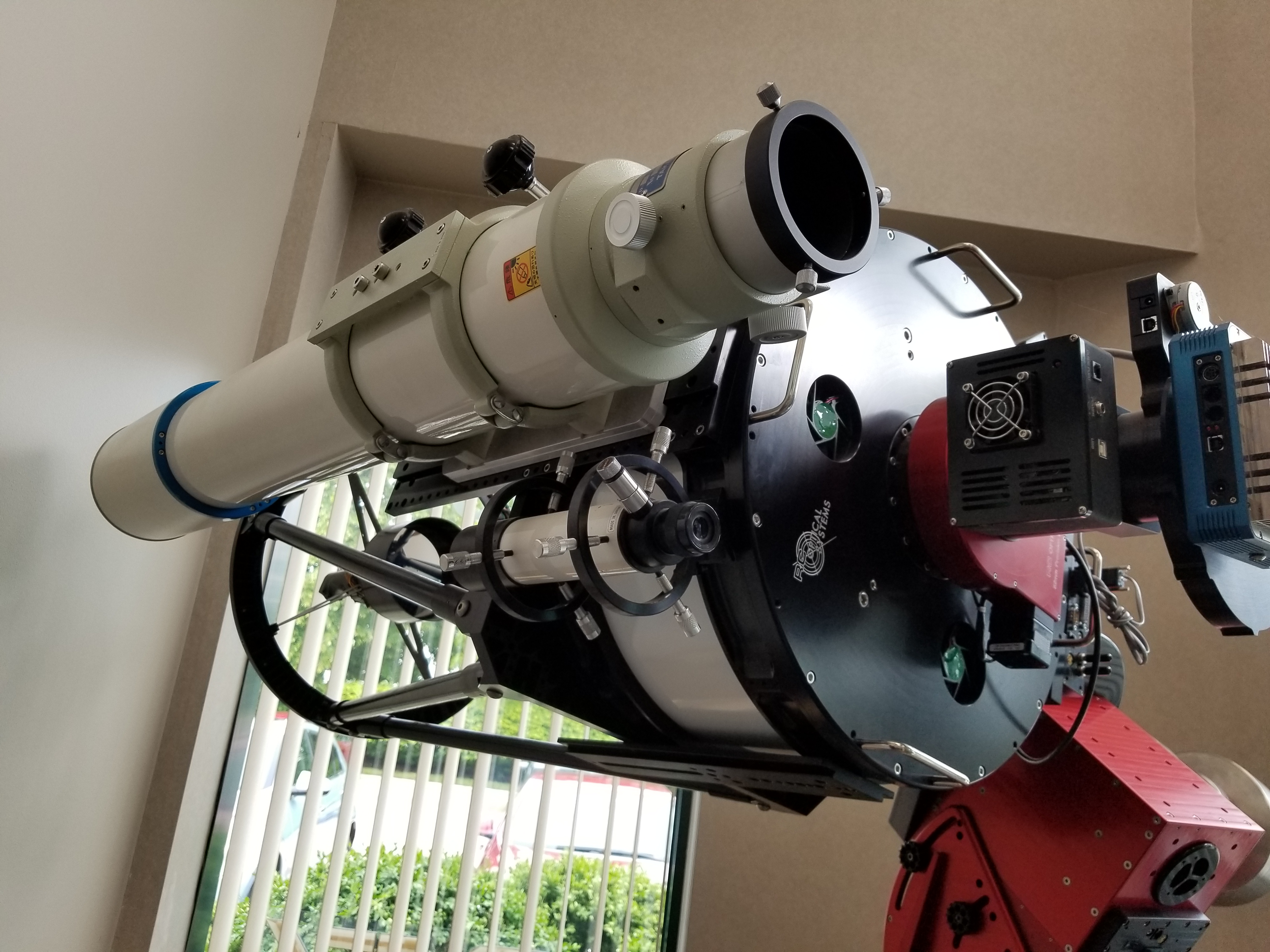
20 in (50.8 cm) RCOS Truss telescope

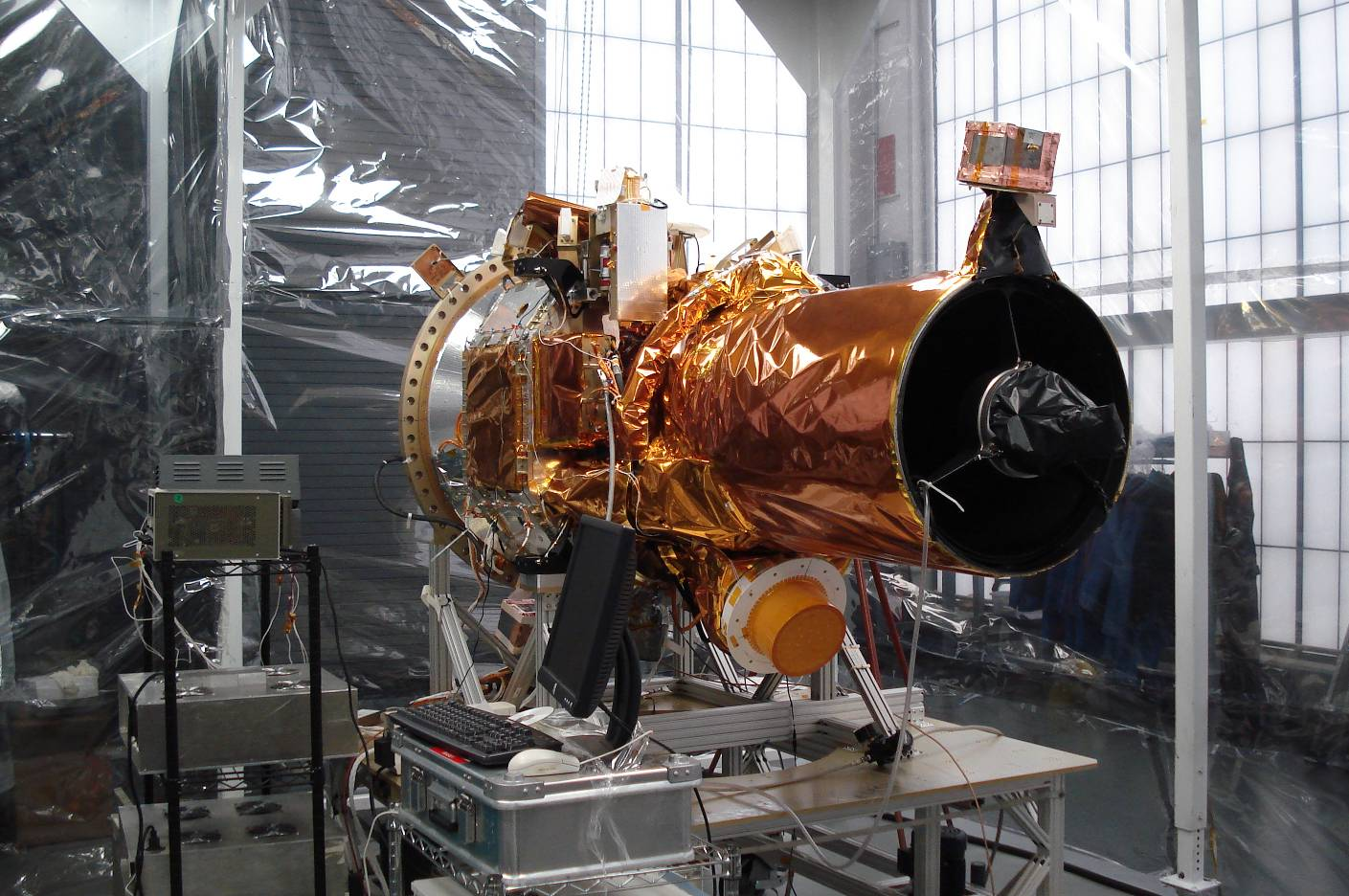
TacSat-2 launch preparations

RC Optical Systems was a high-end American telescope and optics manufacturer that specialized in Ritchey-Chrétien telescopes with hyperbolic mirrors. RC also made related mounts and systems for the telescopes, with a focus on open and closed carbon fiber trusses for low expansion. The basic Ritchey-Chrétien optical system uses two mirrors and no refracting elements, which reduces light loss and its optical characteristics make it popular for astrophotography. Refracting elements may be added to correct for field curvature.

RC Optical Systems was started 1998 and was located in Flagstaff, Arizona. Telescopes and systems were sold commercially to individuals, institutions, and governments. The smallest RCOS telescope, the 12.5 inch F/9 Ritchey-Chrétien had a base price of just over twenty thousand US dollars in 2009, with large and/or custom models costing considerably more.

RC Optical Systems and Star Instruments won a lawsuit in 2008 against Meade Instruments over Meade's description of RCX400 and LX200R telescopes and the Ritchey-Chrétien classification.

RCOS shut down operations in late 2013 and no longer provides support for any of their telescopes or accessories.

Known institutional facilities using the telescopes produced by RC Optical Systems include

Moore Observatory of the University of Louisville has a 0.6-meter and a 0.5-meter at its site near Louisville, Kentucky, USA. It also operates its 0.6-meter at Mt. Lemmon Observatory (MLO) on a site hosted by the University of Arizona.

Lulin Observatory 0.4-meter in Taiwan.

PROMPT telescope (Panchromatic Robotic Optical Monitoring and Polarimetry Telescopes), which was built by the University of North Carolina at Chapel Hill at Cerro Tololo Inter-American Observatory (CTIO) in Chile with six 0.6-meter instruments.

Robinson Observatory of the University of Central Florida, USA, installed a 0.5-meter telescope in 2007. The telescope produced by RCOS has a 20inch diameter aperture. The telescope replaced the 26-inch Tinsley Telescope which was in the dome previously.

Liberty University installed a 0.5-meter RCOS telescope in 2012. The telescope is intended for high-quality research, and they intended to equip the telescope with a CCD camera for Astrophotography.

TacSat-2 observation system, an experimental satellite launched in 2006, included a 0.5-meter telescope.

RCOS telescopes have also been known to be used by amateur astronomers. In one case an amateur astronomer, also a college professor, reported that he had a 10" Ritchey-Chretien telescope from RC Optical Systems among his telescopes along with two refractors.

Major designs offered by 2009, over a decade after its founding included

Telescopes for astronomy

- 12.5 inch F/9 Truss Ritchey-Chrétien, 12.5 inch F/9 Ritchey-Chrétien
- 14.5 inch Truss Ritchey-Chrétien
- 16 inch F/8.4 Ritchey-Chrétien, 16 inch Truss F/8.4 Ritchey-Chrétien
- 20 inch F/8.1 Ritchey-Chrétien, 20 inch Truss F/8.1 Ritchey-Chrétien
- 24 inch f/8 Truss Ritchey-Chrétien
- 32 inch Truss (81 cm) f/7 Ritchey-Chrétien

Telescopes for ruggedized and military use

- 12.5 inch f/9 Military Ritchey-Chrétien
- 16 inch f.8.4 Military Ritchey-Chrétien
- 20 inch f/8.1 Military Ritchey-Chrétien
- 24 inch f/8 Military Ritchey-Chrétien
- 32 inch f/7 Military Ritchey-Chrétien
- 34 inch f/8 Military Ritchey-Chrétien
