= Cerro Tololo Inter-American Observatory =

Observatory in Chile

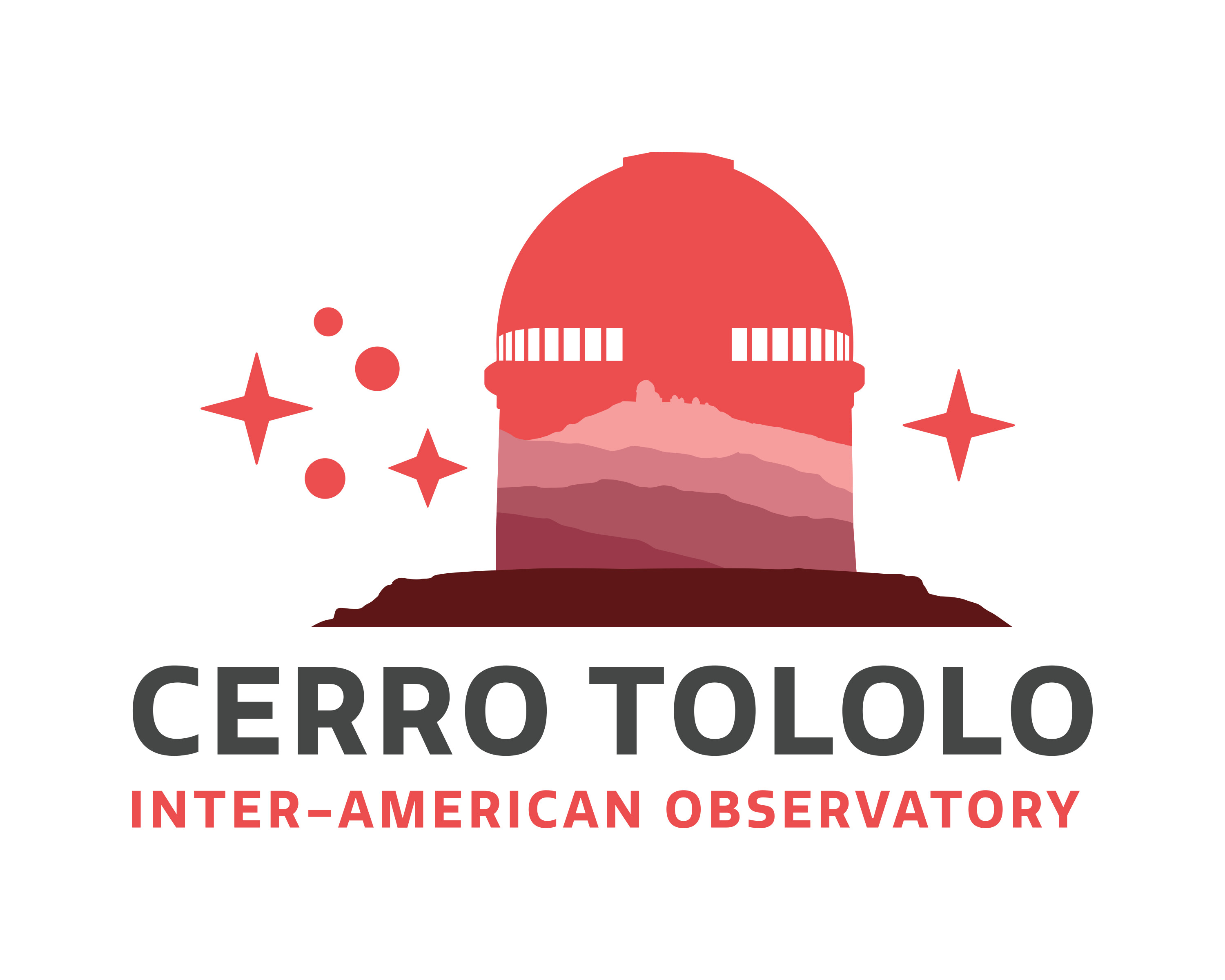

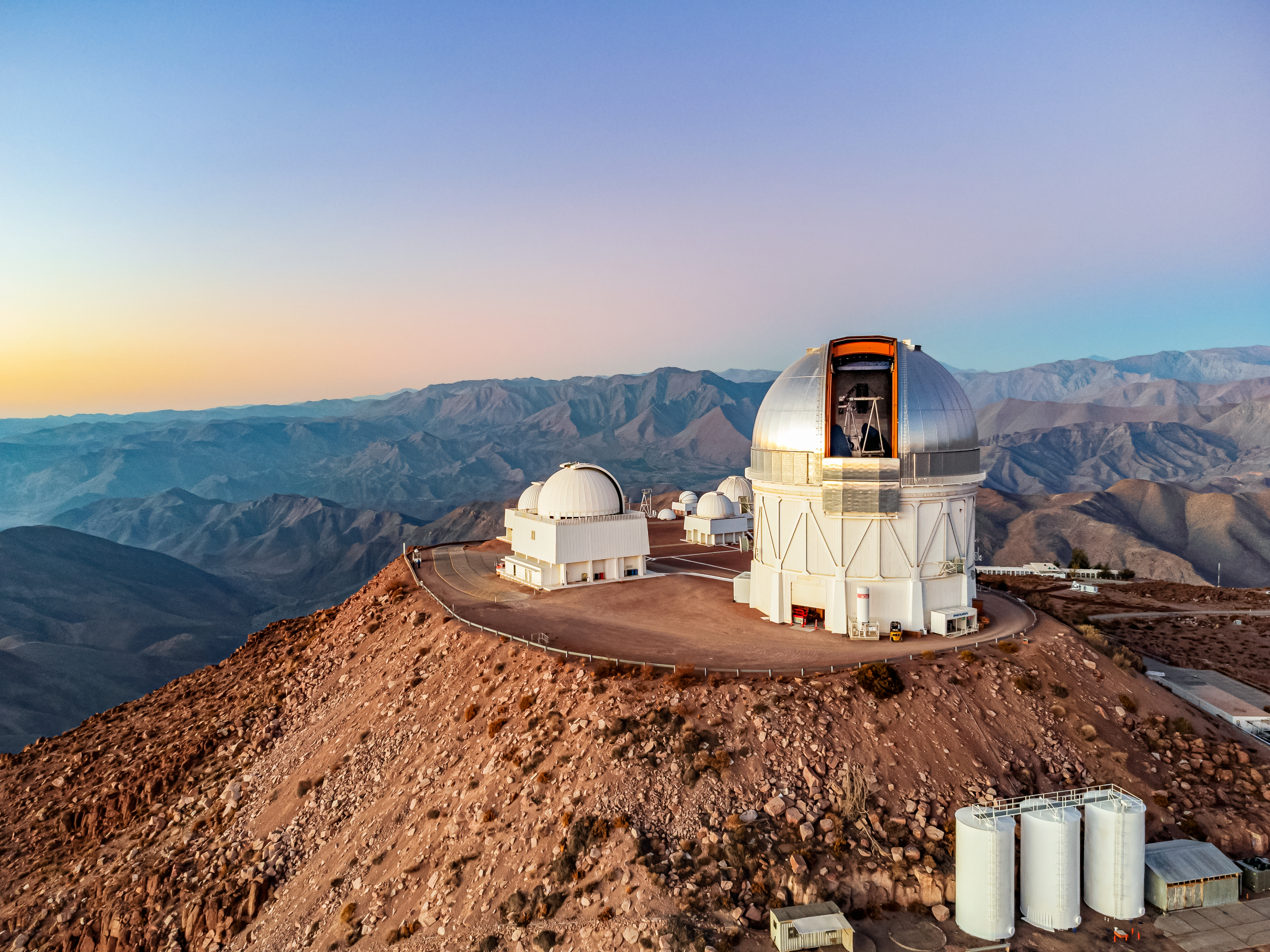
- Cerro Tololo Observatory complex, with the open dome Blanco Telescope in front
- Alternative names: CTIO
- Organization: Association of Universities for Research in Astronomy
- Observatory code: 807
- Location: Coquimbo Region, Chile
- Coordinates: 30°10′09″S 70°48′23″W
- Altitude: 2,207 m (7,241 ft)
- Established: 1962
- Website: noirlab.edu/public/programs/ctio/

Telescopes
- Vera C. Rubin Observatory: 8.4 m reflector
- SOAR Telescope: 4.1 m reflector
- Blanco Telescope: 4.0 m reflector
- SMARTS 1.5-meter: 1.5 m reflector
- SMARTS 1.3-meter: 1.3 m reflector
- SMARTS "Yale" Telescope: 1.0 m reflector
- LCOGTN (u/c): 3× 1.0 m reflectors
- SMARTS 0.9-meter: 0.9 m reflector
- PROMPT 7 (u/c): 0.8 m reflector
- Curtis-Schmidt Telescope: 0.6 m reflector
- Wisconsin H-Alpha Mapper: 0.6 m telescope
- SARA South Telescope: 0.6 m reflector
- CHASE telescope: 0.5 m reflector
- PROMPT: 6× 0.4 m reflectors
- GONG: solar telescope
- Related media on Commons

The Cerro Tololo Inter-American Observatory (CTIO) is an astronomical observatory located on the summit of Mt. Cerro Tololo in the Coquimbo Region of northern Chile, with additional facilities located on Mt. Cerro Pachón about 10 kilometres (6.2 mi) to the southeast. It is approximately 80 kilometres (50 mi) east of La Serena, where support facilities are located. The principal telescopes at CTIO are the 8.4 m surveying Vera C. Rubin Observatory, the 4 m Víctor M. Blanco Telescope, named after Puerto Rican astronomer Víctor Manuel Blanco, and the 4.1 m Southern Astrophysical Research Telescope, which is situated on Cerro Pachón. Other telescopes on Cerro Tololo include the 1.5 m, 1.3 m, 1.0 m, and 0.9 m telescopes operated by the SMARTS consortium. CTIO also hosts other research projects, such as PROMPT, WHAM, and LCOGTN, providing a platform for access to the southern hemisphere for U.S. and worldwide scientific research.

== History ==
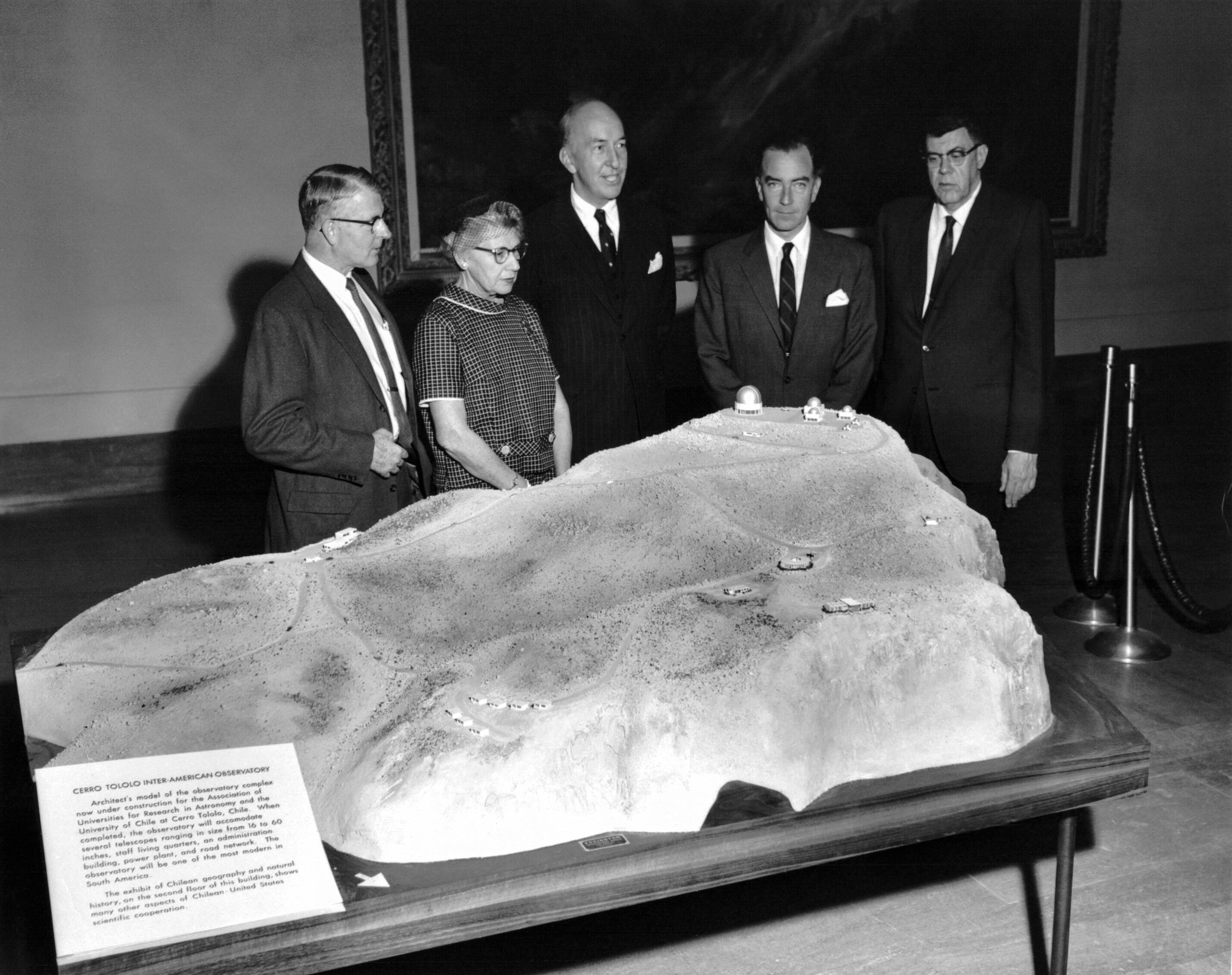
A model of CTIO at the Smithsonian

In 1959, German astronomer Jürgen Stock arrived in Santiago to look for the optimum site for an observatory, working on behalf of the Yerkes Observatory by the University of Chicago under Gerard Kuiper. He went to the semi-arid region of Coquimbo, South of the Atacama Desert, and climbed numerous mountains, carrying a Danjon telescope and an interferometer to determine visibility and accurately measure the wavelength of light. He did not have a barometer to do meteorological forecasting and learnt from muleteers to observe animal behavior, like condor accumulations, for weather changes.

The site for the Inter-American Observatory on Mt. Cerro Tololo was identified by a team of scientists from Chile and the United States in 1959, and it was selected in 1962. Construction began in 1963 with Stock as the first director, and regular astronomical observations commenced in 1965.

In 1974, construction of large buildings on Cerro Tololo ended with the completion of the Víctor Blanco Telescope, but smaller facilities have been built since then. Cerro Pachón is still under development, with two large telescopes (Gemini South and SOAR) inaugurated since 2000, and the Vera C. Rubin Observatory completed in 2025, starting its survey in 2026.

== Organization ==
CTIO is one of two observatories managed by NOIRLab, the other being Kitt Peak National Observatory (KPNO) near Tucson, Arizona. NOIRLab is operated by the Association of Universities for Research in Astronomy (AURA), which owns the property around the two peaks in Chile and at the headquarters in La Serena, Chile. AURA also operates the Space Telescope Science Institute and the Gemini Observatory. The 8.1 m (320 in) Gemini South Telescope located on Cerro Pachón is managed by AURA separately from CTIO for an international consortium. The National Science Foundation (NSF) is the funding agency for NOIRLab.

The Small and Medium Research Telescope System (SMARTS) is a consortium formed in 2001 after NOAO, the predecessor to NOIRLab, announced it would no longer support anything smaller than two meters at CTIO. The member institutions of SMARTS now fund and manage observing time on four telescopes that fit that definition. Access has also been purchased by individual scientists. SMARTS contracts with NOIRLab to maintain the telescopes it controls at CTIO, and NOIRLab retains the right to 25% of the observing time, and Chilean scientists retain 10%. SMARTS began managing telescopes in 2003.

CTIOPI is the Cerro Tololo Interamerican Observatory Parallax Investigation. It began in 1999 and uses two telescopes at Cerro Tololo, the SMARTS 1.5 m reflector and the SMARTS 0.9 m reflector. The purpose of CTIOPI is to discover nearby red, white, and brown dwarfs that lurk unidentified in the solar neighborhood. The goal is to discover 300 new southern star systems within 25 parsecs by determining trigonometric parallaxes accurate to 3 milliarcseconds.

== Telescopes ==
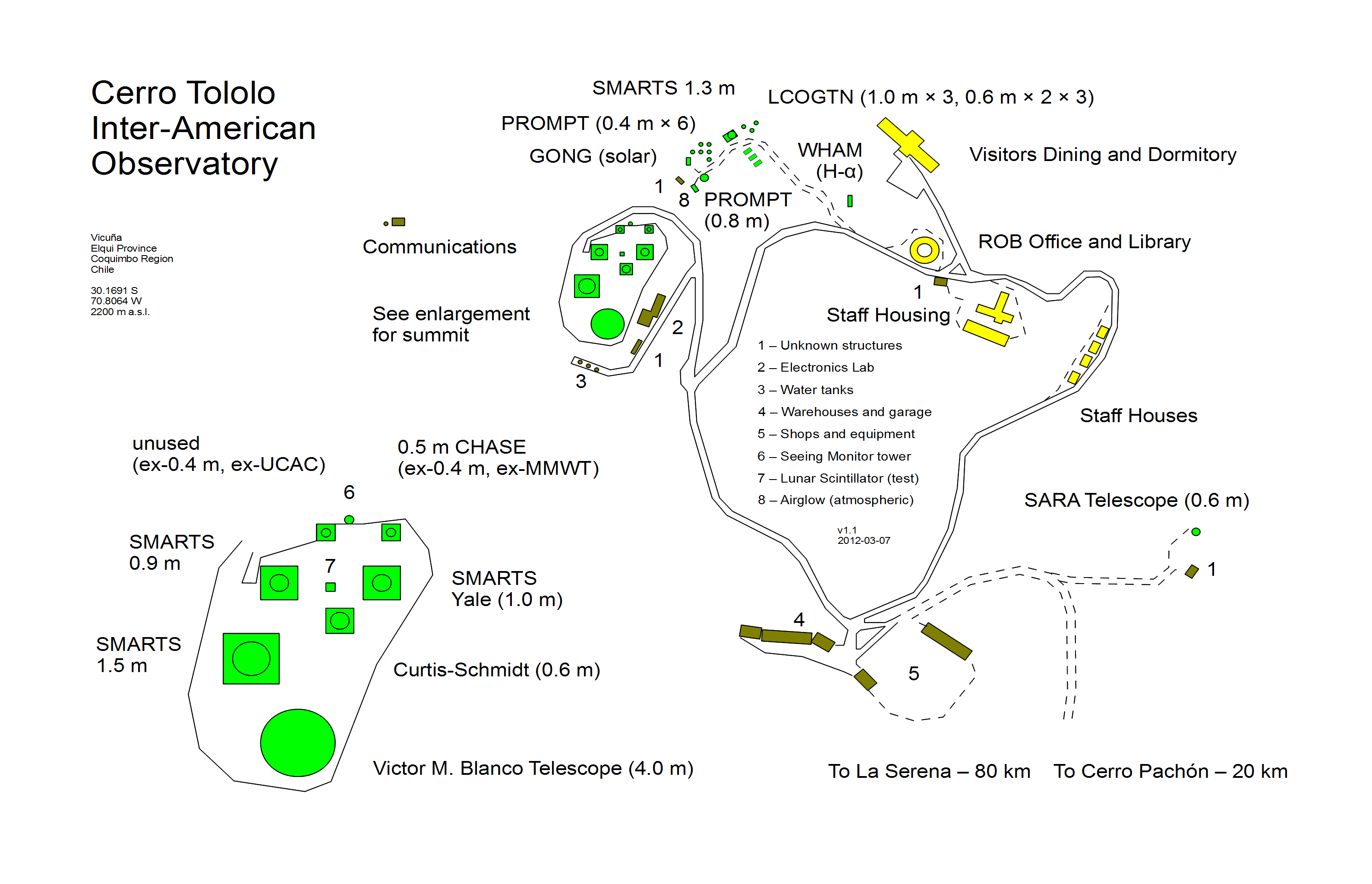
Telescopes and other facilities on the summit of Cerro Tololo

- The Vera C. Rubin Observatory (st-T) is a 8.4 m (330 in) wide-field reflecting telescope completed in 2025 on Cerro Pachón. Construction began in 2011, first light was achieved in mid 2025, and regular operation began mid 2026. It is being used to generate a decade-long astronomical survey similar to the 2MASS survey performed at CTIO. As with Gemini, the LSST is managed separately from CTIO.30°14′40.68″S 70°44′57.90″W.
- The 4.0 m (158 in) Víctor M. Blanco Telescope (Blanco 4m) was completed in 1974 and is very similar to the Nicholas U. Mayall Telescope that was completed at KPNO in 1973. Testing of the telescope and instruments lasted until the beginning of 1976 when science operations began. The Blanco 4m is the only telescope on Cerro Tololo managed directly by NOIRLab.30°10′10.78″S 70°48′23.49″W
- The 4.1 m (161 in) Southern Astrophysical Research Telescope (SOAR) is an optical and near-infrared telescope located on Cerro Pachón. It was dedicated in 2004 and is managed by NOIRLab for an international consortium of which NOIRLab is a partner.30°14′16.41″S 70°44′01.11″W

=== SMARTS telescopes ===
From left to right: the UBC Southern Observatory, the SMARTS 1.0-meter Telescope, the Curtis Schmidt Telescope, the Víctor M. Blanco 4-meter Telescope, the SMARTS 1.5-meter Telescope and the SMARTS 0.9-meter Telescope

- The 1.5 m (59 in) SMARTS Telescope is a Cassegrain reflector on an equatorial mount. Regular observations began in 1968.30°10′09.42″S 70°48′24.44″W
- The 1.3 m (51 in) SMARTS Telescope is a Cassegrain reflector on an equatorial mount. It was built by M3 Engineering and Technology Corporation and used for the 2-micron All-Sky Survey (2MASS). It began operating in 1998 and was given to CTIO in 2001 after the survey was completed.30°10′02.81″S 70°48′17.92″W
- The 1.0 m (39 in) SMARTS Yale Telescope is a closed-tube Cassegrain reflector built by Boller and Chivens. It was first installed in 1965 at the Bethany Observing Station of the Yale University Observatory. It was moved to CTIO in 1974. From 1998 to 2002, it was used by the Yale University–AURA–University of Lisbon–Ohio State University (YALO) consortium with a custom-built sensor. In 2004 it was integrated into SMARTS.30°10′07.92″S 70°48′21.83″W
- The 0.9 m (35 in) SMARTS Telescope is a closed-tube Cassegrain reflector. It was installed at CTIO in 1966.30°10′07.90″S 70°48′23.86″W

=== Tenant telescopes ===
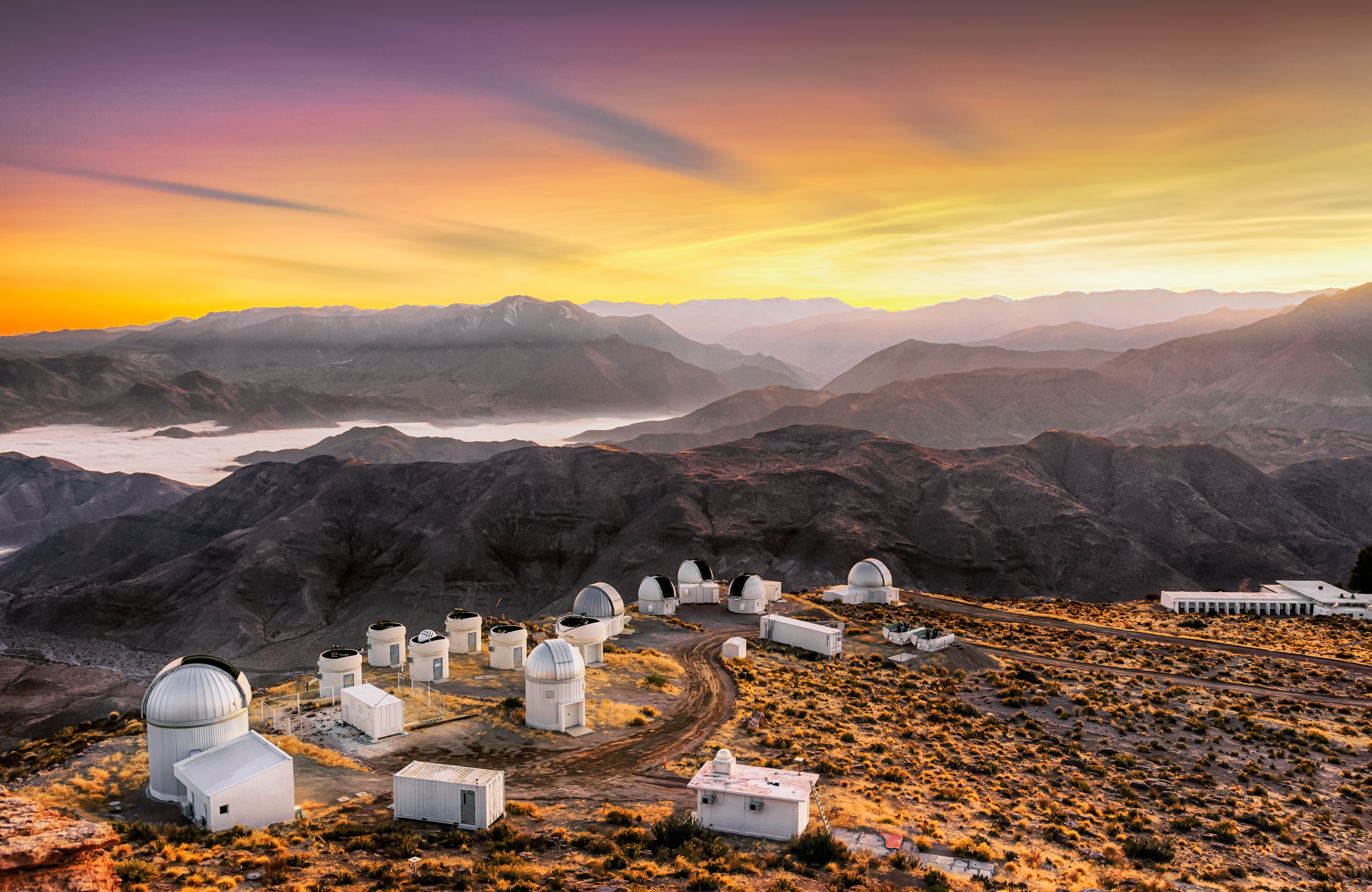
A view of the entire facility

- The 0.6 m (24 in) Southeastern Association for Research in Astronomy (SARA) South Telescope is a reflecting telescope built by Boller and Chivens. Installed in 1968 for the International Planetary Patrol Program, it was owned and operated by Lowell Observatory. At some point control shift to CTIO, which lasted until 1996, after which Lowell used the telescope intermittently. It was refurbished by SARA and put back into use in 2010. Observing time is shared between the members of the SARA consortium. 30°10′19.72″S 70°47′57.13″W
- The 0.61 m (24 in) Curtis-Schmidt Telescope is a Schmidt camera that was installed at CTIO in 1966. Previously, it was located at the University of Michigan's Portage Lake Observatory. It is currently used for the Michigan Orbital DEbris Survey Telescope (MODEST) project, which is part of NASA's program to detect and catalog orbital debris. Two-thirds of observing time was at the discretion of NOAO prior to 2001. From 1989 to 1995 it was used in part by the Calán/Tololo Survey. 30°10′08.60″S 70°48′22.63″W
- The Wisconsin H-Alpha Mapper (WHAM) is a custom-built 0.6 m (24 in) telescope used to study the warm ionized medium. In 2009, it was moved to CTIO from KPNO, where it operated from 1996 to 2008.30°10′05.92″S 70°48′12.85″W
- A 0.5 m (20 in) reflecting telescope built by Officina Stellare of Italy was installed in 2010 as part of the Chilean Automatic Supernova Search (CHASE). The project is run by the Center for Excellence in Astrophysics and Associated Technologies (CATA) of the University of Chile Department of Astronomy. The telescope will also be part of Global Robotic-telescopes Intelligent Array (GLORIA). It is located in the building that previously housed the Millimeter-wave Telescope. 30°10′06.97″S 70°48′21.65″W The existing dome was replaced by a new clamshell-style dome as part of the project. CHASE has used the PROMPT telescopes for 10% of the time since 2009.
- The Panchromatic Robotic Optical Monitoring and Polarimetry Telescopes (PROMPT) installation consists of five 0.4 m (16 in) Ritchey-Chrétien reflectors built by RC Optical Systems. Each telescope is fitted with a filter and camera designed to observe gamma ray bursts at different wavelengths. When not observing an event, the telescopes are used remotely by public school students in North Carolina. Construction of six fully automated domes started in 2004 and the telescopes began operating in 2006. The status of a sixth telescope, originally planned to observe at near-infrared wavelengths, is unclear. The building for a seventh PROMPT telescope, a larger 0.8 m (31 in) unit, was completed in 2011.30°10′03.52″S 70°48′18.91″W
- The Global Oscillations Network Group (GONG) deployed an observing station to study helioseismology in 1995.30°10′03.92″S 70°48′19.84″W
- Eight 40 cm telescopes, each equipped with a CCD camera sensitive to red optical and near-infrared light used by the MEarth Project.
- Las Cumbres Observatory Global Telescope Network operates three 1.0 m (39 in) and two 0.4 m (16 in) telescopes at Cerro Tololo. Construction of the domes began in 2010 and was completed in 2011. The telescopes were installed and commissioned in 2012.30°10′02.58″S 70°48′17.24″W
- The Korean Microlensing Telescope Network (KMTNet), led by the Korea Astronomy and Space Science Institute (KASI), operates a 1.6 m (63 in) telescope as part network of three telescopes dedicated to detecting exoplanets. The large CCD camera was installed on the telescope in September 2014.30°10′01.84″S 70°48′14.39″W
- The Evryscope is a multiple-aperture (22x 0.061 m (2.4 in) telescopes) wide-field survey telescope taking approximately 5000 images per night.
- The 0.82 m (32 in) T80S telescope is operated by the Southern Photometric Local Universe Survey (S-PLUS) collaboration.

=== Former telescopes ===
- The 1.2 m (47 in) Millimeter-wave Telescope is a Cassegrain reflector with a primary mirror made of machined aluminum, remachined in USA by Phelps-Dodge to a surface accuracy of lambda/400. It was installed at CTIO in 1982, and an identical telescope is located at the Center for Astrophysics | Harvard & Smithsonian. It was used for spectrometric mapping-surveys of the distribution of carbon monoxide at a rest-wavelength of 2.6 millimeters in molecular clouds in the third and fourth quadrants of the Milky Way, and in the Magellanic Clouds while at CTIO. In 2009, it was moved to the Chilean National Astronomical Observatory's campus on Cerro Calán near Santiago.30°10′06.97″S 70°48′21.65″W
- A 0.41 m (16 in) telescope was transported to the summit on mules in 1961 to perform site testing. It was later installed in a dome at CTIO in 1965. Its dome was used by the Millimeter-wave Telescope beginning in 1982.30°10′06.97″S 70°48′21.65″W
- A second 0.41 m (16 in) telescope was installed in 1965. It was removed at some point and the building was used for UCAC.30°10′06.95″S 70°48′22.82″W
- A 0.2 m (7.9 in) astrograph was used by the USNO CCD Astrograph Catalog (UCAC) project from 1998 to 2001. It was located in one of the 16-inch telescope domes. After surveying the southern sky, it was moved to United States Naval Observatory Flagstaff Station to complete its mission.30°10′06.95″S 70°48′22.82″W
- The Southern H-Alpha Sky Survey Atlas (SHASSA) operated at CTIO from 1997 to 2006 in its own small dome, which was dubbed El Enano ('the Dwarf') by the local staff. It was removed at the end of the project and donated to a school in La Serena.

=== Other scientific projects ===
- The Andes Lidar Observatory is a National Science Foundation project to measure the upper atmosphere above the Andes which uses several passive optical instruments.

== Discoveries ==
Asteroids discovered: 6
(87269) 2000 OO67	July 29, 2000
(87555) 2000 QB243	August 25, 2000
88611 Teharonhiawako	August 20, 2001
(134210) 2005 PQ21	August 9, 2005
(139775) 2001 QG298	August 19, 2001
2022 AP7	January 13, 2022

Supernovae discovered: 1
December 7, 2013

On the morning of Saturday, December 7, 2013, Luis González, a research assistant at the University of Chile, discovered what would later be confirmed as a supernova by José Maza, an astronomer at University of Chile and a researcher for CATA (Centro de Astrofísica y Tecnologías Afines or “Centre for Astrophysics and Related Technologies”). The supernova is the first discovery to be made by the CATA 500, a robotic telescope designed and operated by a Chilean team located in Santiago, approximately 500 kilometres to the south. It is part of the GLORIA project, which provides open access to astronomers from around the world to a network of remotely operated robotic telescopes. The new supernova lies in the galaxy ESO 365-G16, located 370 million light years from Earth, and has a mass eight times that of the Sun.

Gomez's Hamburger, believed to be a young star surrounded by a protoplanetary disk, was discovered in 1985 on sky photographs obtained by Arturo Gomez, support technical staff at the Observatory.

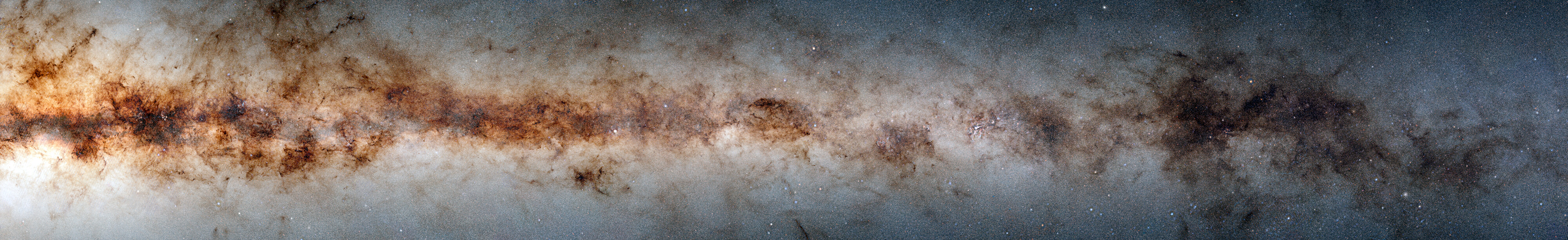
A program of NOIRLab has published a mammoth survey of the galactic plane of the Milky Way.

== See also ==
- List of astronomical observatories
- List of highest astronomical observatories
- Other observatories in Chile:
  - Atacama Large Millimeter Array
  - Cerro Armazones Observatory (Very Large Telescope, Extremely Large Telescope)
  - Cerro El Roble Astronomical Station
  - La Silla Observatory
  - Las Campanas Observatory
  - Llano de Chajnantor Observatory (Atacama Large Millimeter Array)
  - Paranal Observatory
- MEarth Project
- MCELS (Magellanic Cloud Emission-line Survey)
- Tololo 1247-232 - One of only two known Lyman continuum photons emitters
