= Pelicano Airport =

Airport in Chile

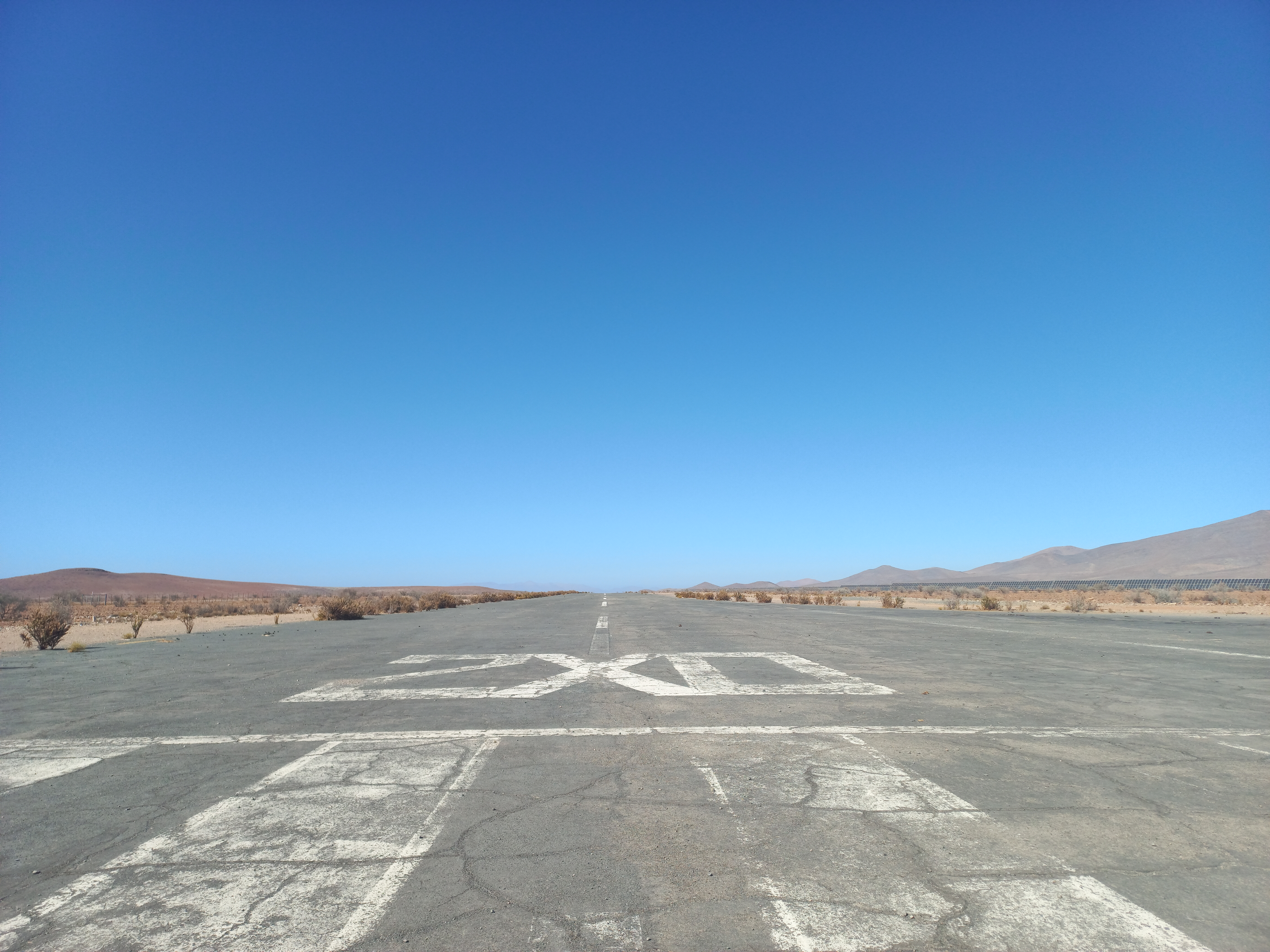
- IATA: none; ICAO: SCEC

Summary
- Airport type: Public
- Serves: Las Campanas Observatory
- Location: Estación Chañar, Chile
- Elevation AMSL: 3,678 ft / 1,121 m
- Coordinates: 29°08′40″S 70°53′16″W

Map
- Location of Pelicano Airport in Chile

Runways
Direction	Length		Surface
Direction	m	ft	Surface
02/20	1,320	4,331	Asphalt
- Source: Landings.com Google Maps GCM

Pelicano Airport Spanish: Aeropuerto Pelicano, (ICAO: SCEC) is a desert airport near Estación Chañar, La Higuera, in the Coquimbo Region of Chile.

The airport serves the astronomy community of the Las Campanas Observatory, one of the high elevation observatories in the Atacama Desert.

The runway has an additional 360 metres (1,180 ft) of gravel overrun on the south end, which then drops into a canyon.

== See also ==
- Transport in Chile
- List of airports in Chile
