= Prompt =

Prompt may refer to:

== Computing ==
- Command prompt, characters indicating the computer is ready to accept input
- Command Prompt (Windows), also known as cmd.exe or cmd, the command-line interpreter in some operating systems
- Prompt engineering, instructions issued to a client software system (such as a generative artificial intelligence agent harness) in the form of written or spoken language

== Other uses ==
- Project Resource Organisation Management Planning Techniques, a project management method; the predecessor to PRINCE2
- Prompt NO_{x}, a source of nitrogen oxides
- PROMPT, the Performing arts ephemera collection at the National Library of Australia
- PROMPT Telescopes (Panchromatic Robotic Optical Monitoring and Polarimetry Telescopes), Chile
- Prompter (theatre), sometimes prompt, one who prompts an actor if they forget their line

== See also ==
- Prompt neutron, in nuclear engineering
  - Prompt criticality
