= Cerro Morado, Chile =

Mountain in Chile

Cerro Morado
- Location within Chile

Highest point
- Elevation: 2,135 m (7,005 ft)
- Coordinates: 30°12′38″S 70°48′16″W

Geography
- Country: Chile

Cerro Morado is a mountain in north-central Chile, located east of the city of La Serena in the Coquimbo Region. Cerro Morado was scouted along with Cerro Tololo and other nearby mountains by AURA astronomers in 1960 as a potential site for an observatory. At the invitation of AURA, that by then owned property on the top of the mountain, Cerro Morado was the site of a 1963 meeting of European Southern Observatory officials to discuss their plans in Chile. It was attended among others by Charles Fehrenbach, Otto Heckmann, Jan Oort, Nicholas U. Mayall and Frank K. Edmondson. In late 1962 and early 1963 Cerro Morado was investigated by the Carnegie Institute as a potential site for an observatory that was eventually done on Cerro Las Campanas becoming the Las Campanas Observatory. In 1969 the mountain was again a candidate site for a telescope with Harvard and Yale Universities and MIT planning one on it.

== See also ==
- List of astronomical observatories
