= Southern Astrophysical Research Telescope =

Observatory in Chile

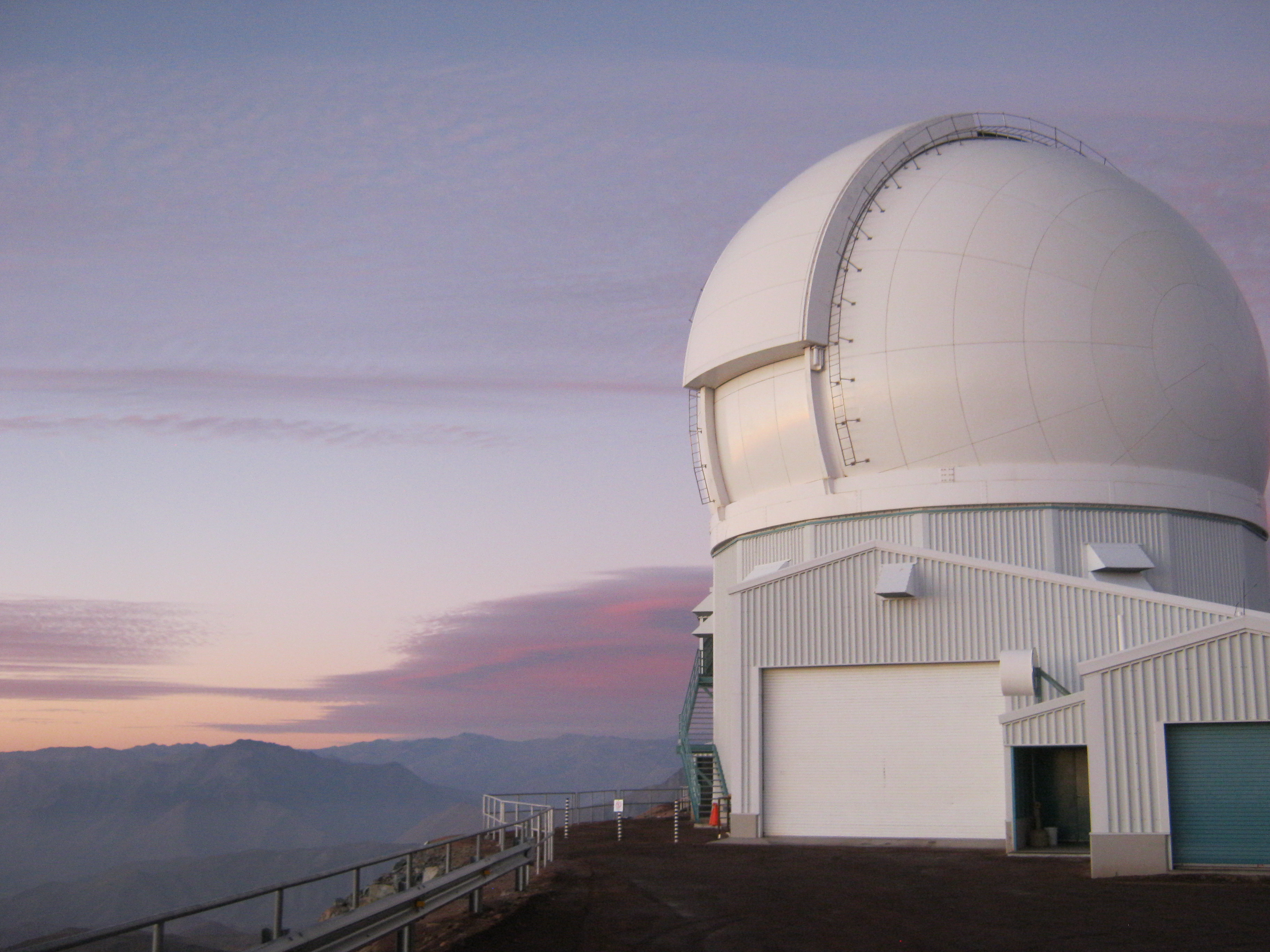
- SOAR Telescope, as seen at evening twilight
- Alternative names: SOAR
- Location(s): Vicuña, Elqui Province, Coquimbo Region, Chile
- Coordinates: 30°14′17″S 70°44′01″W
- Altitude: 2,738 m (8,983 ft)
- Diameter: 4.1 m (13 ft 5 in)
- Website: noirlab.edu/science/programs/ctio/telescopes/soar-telescope
- Location of Southern Astrophysical Research Telescope
- Related media on Commons

The Southern Astrophysical Research (SOAR) telescope is a modern 4.1-meter-aperture (13 ft) optical and near-infrared telescope located on Cerro Pachón, Chile, at 2,738 metres (8,983 ft) elevation. It was commissioned in 2003, and is operated by a consortium including the countries of Brazil and Chile, Michigan State University, the Cerro Tololo Inter-American Observatory (CTIO) (part of the National Optical Astronomy Observatory, NOAO), and the University of North Carolina at Chapel Hill. Partners have guaranteed shares varying from 10 to 30 percent of the observing time.

The telescope uses active optics on its primary and secondary mirrors to attain median image quality 0.7 arcsec at a wavelength of 500 nm. Multiple instruments are available on standby, mounted at unusually high weight-capacity Nasmyth foci and two lower capacity bent-Cassegrain foci. Switching is accomplished within a few minutes by rotating the 45° tertiary mirror. The pointing of this mirror is adjusted at high speed to prevent image blur from vibrations induced by wind-shake of the telescope structure.

== Overview ==
Its optical specifications are:

- M1 total diameter 4300mm
- Entrance Pupil Diameter 4100mm
- Pupil central Obstruction 980mm
- M1 working f/# 1.6855 (no prime focus is available)
- Focal plane working f/# 16.625
- Effective Focal Length 68176.3mm
- Gamma ratio (dZ(foc)/dZ(M2)) 100.5
- Zero-Vignetting Field Diameter 14.4arcmin
- Focal Plane Radius of curvature 966.3mm
- Sag w/r to Maximum Field 10.59mm

== Instruments ==
Current (5/2014) instruments are:

- UV–optical 16-million pixel imager (SOI, CTIO)
- near-infrared (1–2.4 μm wavelength) 1-million pixel HgCdTe imager and spectrograph (OSIRIS, Ohio State University/CTIO)
- UV–optical 16-million pixel imager and spectrograph (Goodman Spectrograph, UNC)
- near-infrared (1–2.4 μm wavelength) 16-million pixel HgCdTe imager (SPARTAN, MSU)
- adaptive optics module (SAM, CTIO)

Additional facility instruments are being commissioned:

- UV–optical 16-million pixel integral-field spectrograph (SIFS, Brazil)

User instruments are employed by individual astronomers or teams but not available to all users.

US astronomers access the telescope remotely over the Internet 2. Chilean and Brazilian astronomers use their high-speed networks. An on-site operator controls where the telescope points while the remote astronomer controls the instrument and data retrieval.

The SOAR telescope dome is a $2 million, 66-foot-diameter (20 m), weatherproof structure weighing over 70 tons.

== Gallery ==
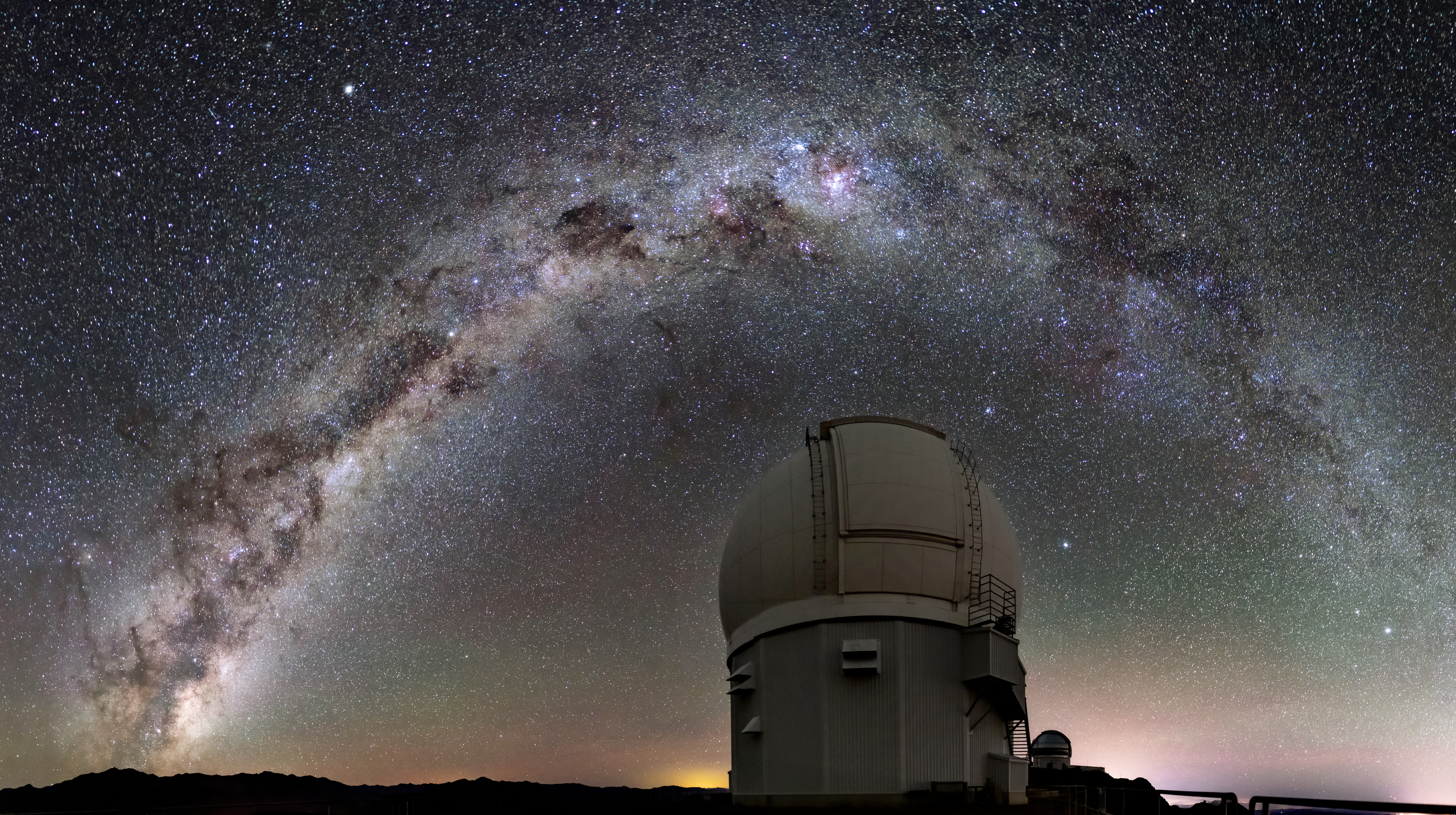
SOAR Below the Milky Way

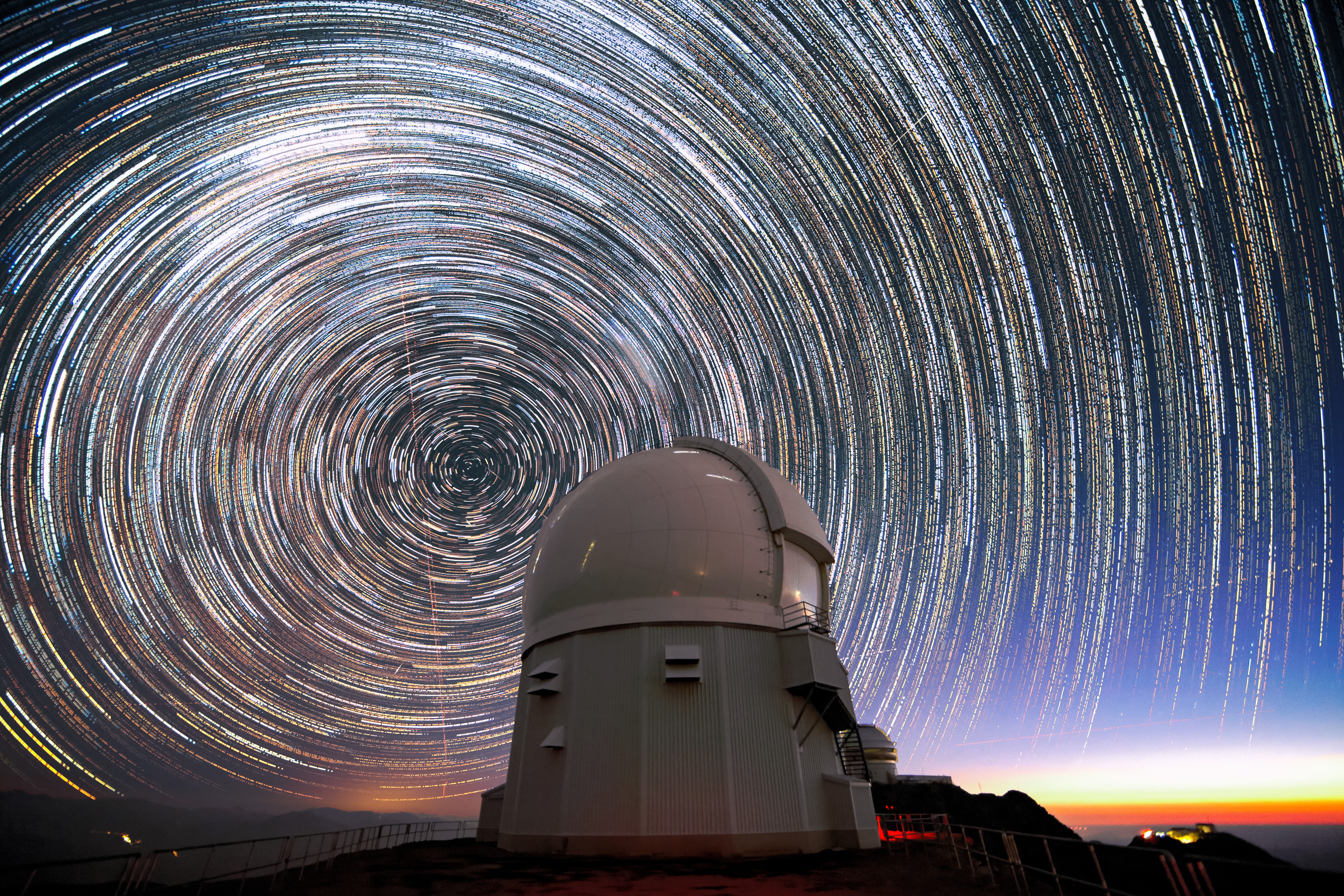
This image shows stars appearing to "trail" around the south celestial pole (at the center of the circles) above the Southern Astrophysical Research Telescope

== See also ==
- List of largest optical reflecting telescopes
- List of observatories
