= Reynolds Layer =

The Reynolds Layer is a layer of ionised hydrogen gas in the plane of the Milky Way. It was named after Ron Reynolds who discovered that there is such gas. The layer is a disk 750,000 light years in diameter, and 6000 light years thick. The whole disk rotates in the same direction as the Milky Way.
