= Robinson Observatory =

Observatory in Florida, US

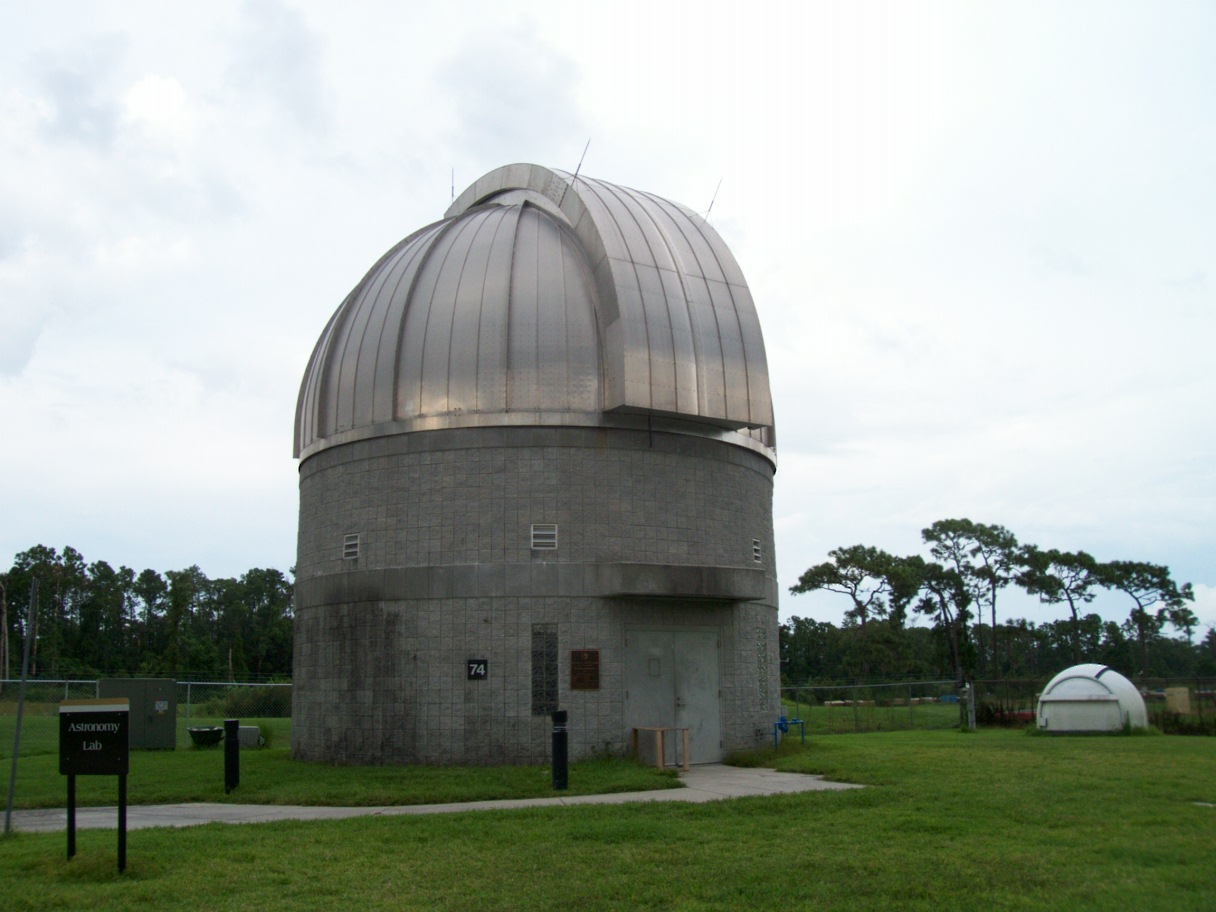
- Organization: University of Central Florida; College of Sciences
- Location: Orlando, FL, United States
- Coordinates: 28°35′30″N 81°11′26″W
- Established: 1995
- Website: physics.ucf.edu/observatory.php

Telescopes
- Primary telescope: RCOS Ritchey-Chrétien 20-inch reflector
- Secondary telescope: Meade LX200 14-inch reflector
- Portable telescope: Meade LX200 8-inch reflector
- Portable telescope: Meade LX90 8-inch reflector (6)

The Robinson Observatory is an astronomical observatory owned and operated by the University of Central Florida College of Sciences in Orlando, Florida, USA.

Public viewings are held the first and third Wednesday of each month and are sponsored by the Central Florida Astronomical Society (CFAS).

== History ==
The observatory was built at a cost of over $500,000 in 1995, with Herbert Robinson donating almost half of the total cost. The observatory was given the name Robinson posthumously, eight months after Herbert Robinson's death, on April 25, 1996.

In the 2000s, a number of updates and renovations were completed at the observatory. The most recent addition was in 2007; it included high speed internet, a new 20-inch (50 cm) Ritchey-Chrétien telescope, and the ability to remotely operate the telescope and dome.

== Future ==
Plans are under way to expand the Robinson Observatory to include two smaller telescopes with domes donated by the United States Air Force.

== See also ==
- List of astronomical observatories
- University of Central Florida
- College of Sciences
