= Las Campanas Observatory =

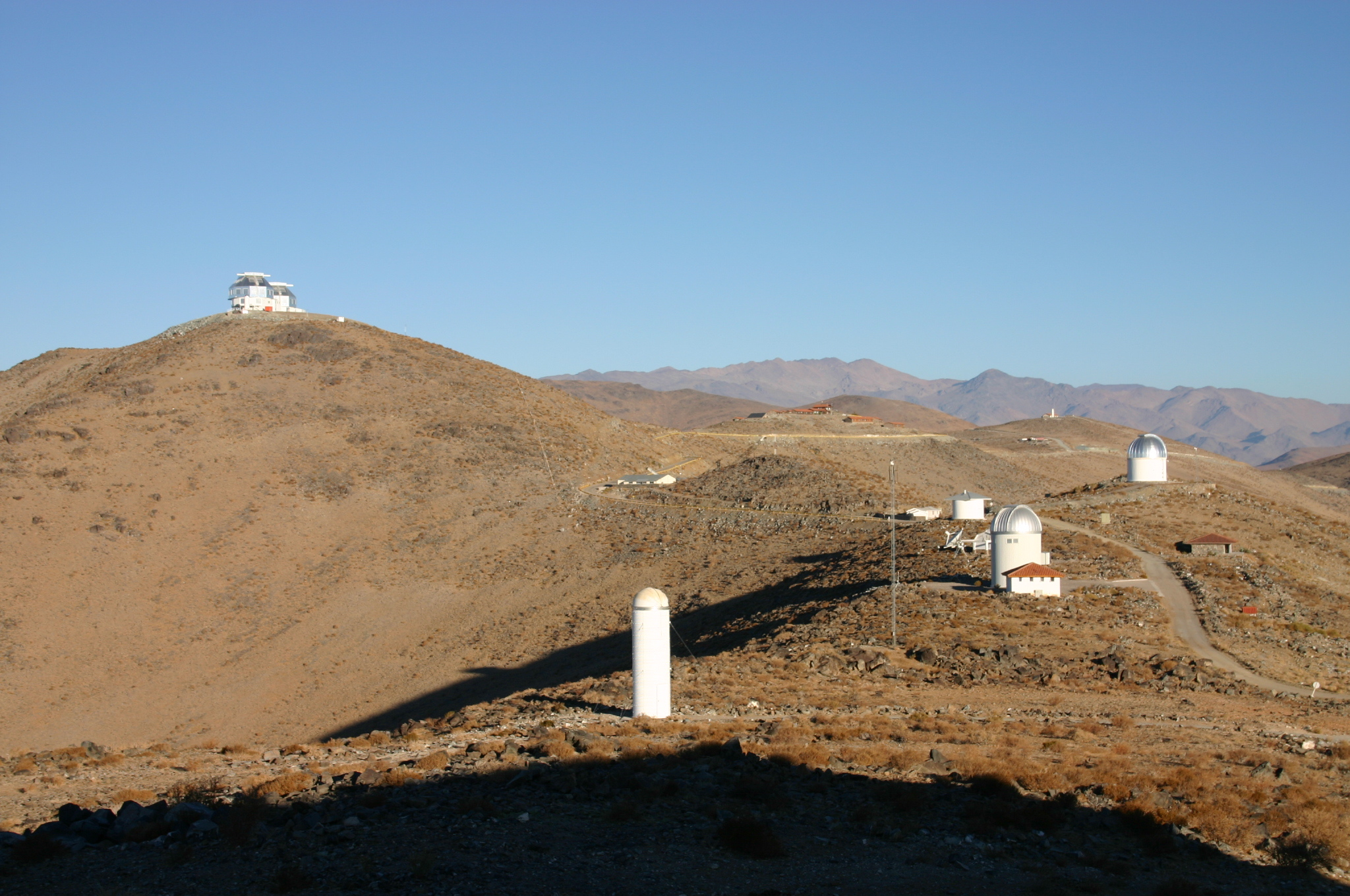
- Telescopes at Las Campanas Observatory
- Alternative names: LCO
- Organization: Carnegie Institution for Science
- Observatory code: 304, I05
- Location: Atacama Region, Chile
- Coordinates: 29°00′57″S 70°41′31″W
- Altitude: 2,380 m (7,810 ft)
- Established: 1969
- Website: www.lco.cl
- Telescopes: Du Pont Telescope; Swope Telescope; Warsaw Telescope; Giant Magellan Telescope; Magellan Telescopes
- Location of Las Campanas Observatory
- Related media on Commons

Las Campanas Observatory (LCO) is an astronomical observatory managed by the Carnegie Institution for Science (CIS). Located in Chile's Atacama Region, it sits about 100 kilometres (62 mi) northeast of the city of La Serena. The LCO's telescopes and facilities are positioned near the northern end of a 7 km (4.3 mi) mountain ridge. Cerro Las Campanas, situated near the southern end of this ridge and standing over 2,500 m (8,200 ft) tall, will be the future site of the Giant Magellan Telescope.

Established in 1969, LCO is CIS's primary observatory, having taken over this role from Mount Wilson Observatory due to increasing light pollution in the Los Angeles area. The headquarters of Carnegie Observatories is in Pasadena, California, while the main office in Chile is in La Serena, close to the University of La Serena and near the Association of Universities for Research in Astronomy facility.

The observatory is served by Pelicano Airport, located 23 kilometres (14 mi) to the southwest. Prior to the establishment of the observatory on Cerro Las Campanas the mountain of Cerro Morado was surveyed in late 1962 and early 1963 as a potential site.

== Telescopes ==
- The 6.5 m (260 in) Magellan Telescopes are two identical single-mirror reflecting telescopes. The Walter Baade Telescope saw first light in 2000, and the Landon Clay Telescope in 2002. They are managed by LCO for an international consortium of institutions which includes LCO.
- The 2.5 m (98 in) du Pont Telescope is named after industrialist Irénée du Pont and has been in operation since 1977. It is a Ritchey-Chrétien telescope with a Gascoigne corrector lens, and was built by Boller & Chivens and L&F Industries.
- The 1.0 m (39 in) Swope Telescope was the first telescope installed at LCO, and began operating in 1971. It is named after CIS astronomer Henrietta Swope. It is a Ritchey-Chrétien telescope built by Boller & Chivens with a Gascoigne corrector lens.

=== Tenant telescopes ===
- The 1.3 m (51 in) Warsaw Telescope is the main instrument of the Optical Gravitational Lensing Experiment operated by the University of Warsaw Observatory. Installed in 1996, it is a Ritchey-Chrétien design built by DFM Engineering. Exact location: 29°00′35.8″S 70°42′05.9″W ± 1 meter, altitude of the base of the building 2,275 metres (7,464 ft) over mean sea level.
- The All Sky Automated Survey (ASAS) is a project to monitor the southern sky for variable stars. It consists of two wide-field telescopes, one narrow field telescope, and one ultra-wide field telescope. A prototype system was installed in 1996 and a second in 1997, both in the same enclosure as the 10-inch astrograph. The three larger telescopes were installed in 2000. The ultra-wide device was added in 2002 when the existing telescopes were moved to a new, smaller enclosure. Location: 29°00′36.9″S 70°42′05.1″W ± 5 meter.
- The Hungarian Automated Telescope South (HAT-South) facility is part of the HATNet Project to detect exoplanets using the transit method. It consists of a pair of four 0.18 m (7.1 in) Takahasi reflecting astrographs on a common mount. It was installed in 2009.
- The Birmingham Solar Oscillations Network (BiSON) operates at station at LCO.
- The Local Volume Mapper of the SDSS-V consists of four telescopes (siderostats) each with 0.16 m diameter near 29°00′39.0″S 70°42′02.34″W.

=== Former telescopes ===
- The 4.0 m (13.1 ft) NANTEN millimeter-wavelength radio telescope was located at LCO from 1995 to 2004. It is now located at the Pampa La Bola site of the Llano de Chajnantor Observatory and is known as the NANTEN2 Observatory.
- The 0.61 m (24 in) Helen Sawyer Hogg Telescope (HSHT) was operated at LCO by the University of Toronto Southern Observatory from 1971 to 1997. It is now located at Leoncito Astronomical Complex.
- A 0.25 m (10 in) astrograph operated at the site for some time, and was used to discover Supernova 1987A (SN 1987A).
- The Pi of the Sky project operated two wide-angle cameras that searched for the optical signature of gamma ray bursts at LCO starting in 2004. The installation was moved to a commercial telescope hosting site in San Pedro de Atacama in 2011.

=== Future telescopes ===
- The Giant Magellan Telescope is an extremely large telescope under construction at LCO, with commissioning expected to begin in 2029. It is 24.5 m (80 ft) effective aperture design with seven 8.4 m (28 ft) segments. The telescope will have a light-gathering area of 368 m^{2} (3,960 ft^{2}), which is roughly fifteen times greater than one of the Magellan telescopes. The mirrors are being fabricated by the Steward Observatory Mirror Laboratory, and the first was started in 2005.

== Discoveries ==
On February 24, 1987 at LCO, Ian Shelton and Oscar Duhalde became the first official observers of Supernova 1987A (SN 1987A).

On August 17, 2017 at LCO, SSS17a, the optical counterpart to the gravitational wave source GW170817, was discovered with the Swope telescope.

== Gallery ==
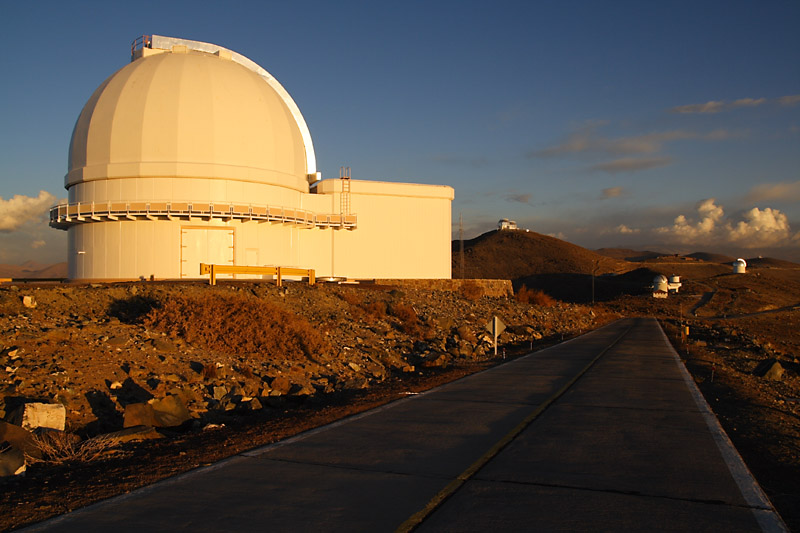
du Pont telescope

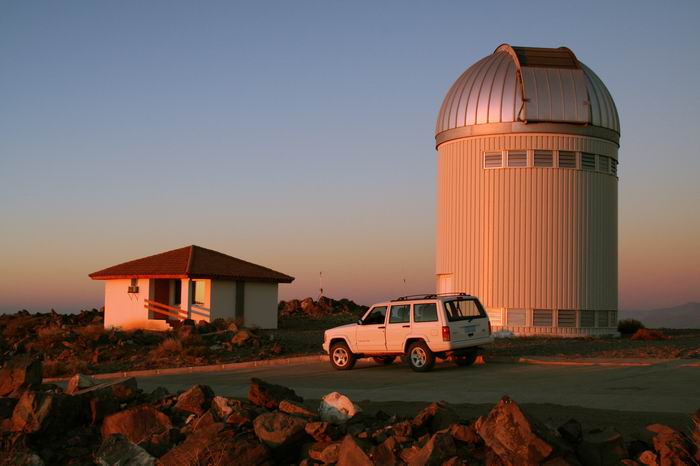
Warsaw telescope dome and control building

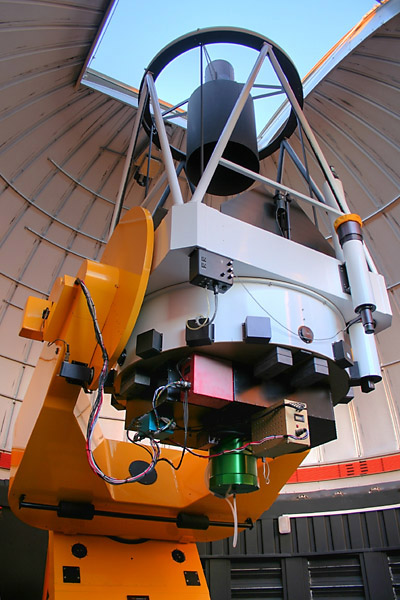
Warsaw telescope

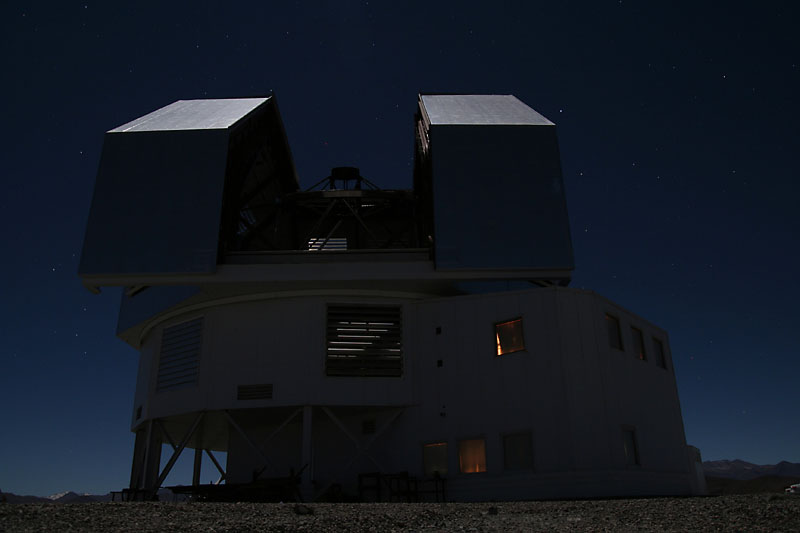
Clay telescope (one of the Magellan telescopes)

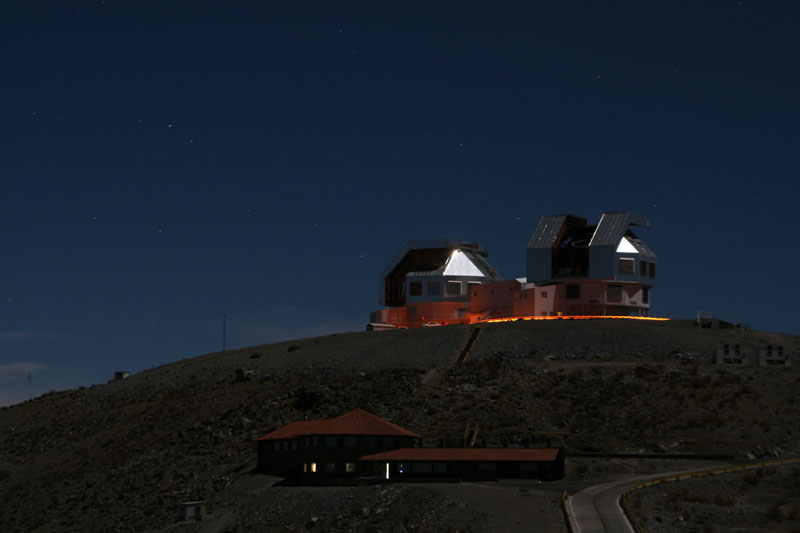
Magellan telescopes

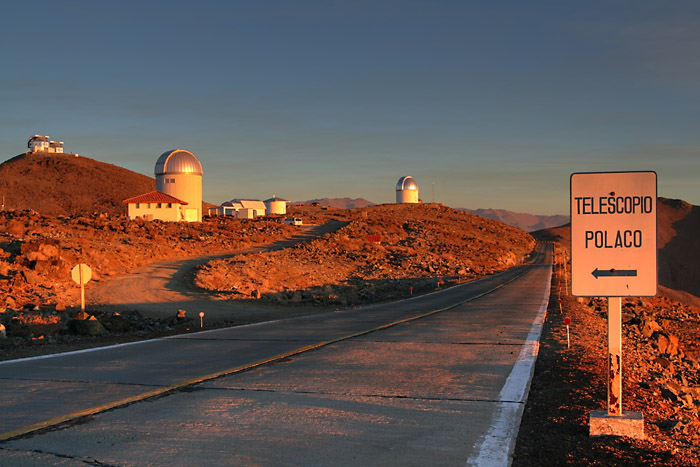
Magellan telescopes, Warsaw and Swope telescopes (LTR)

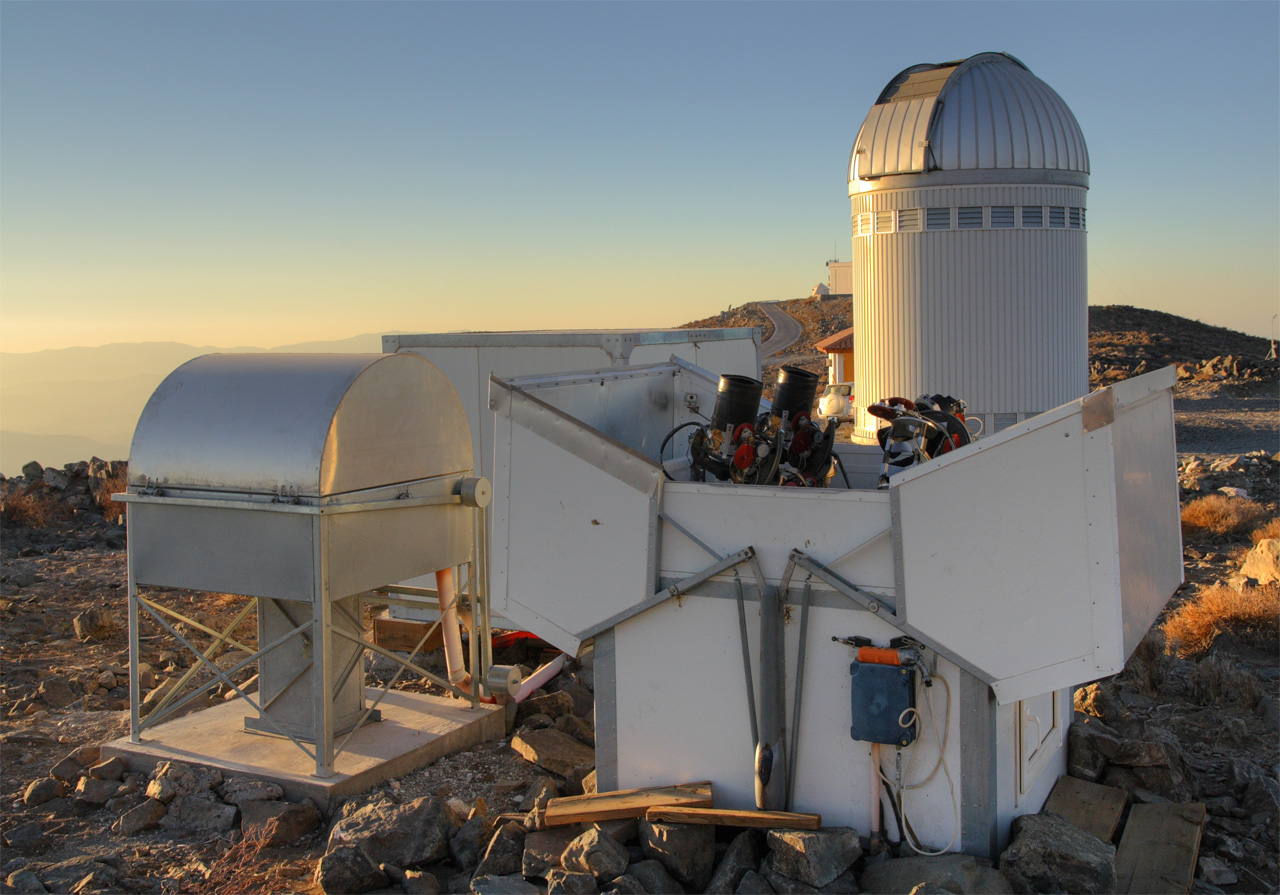
ASAS telescopes

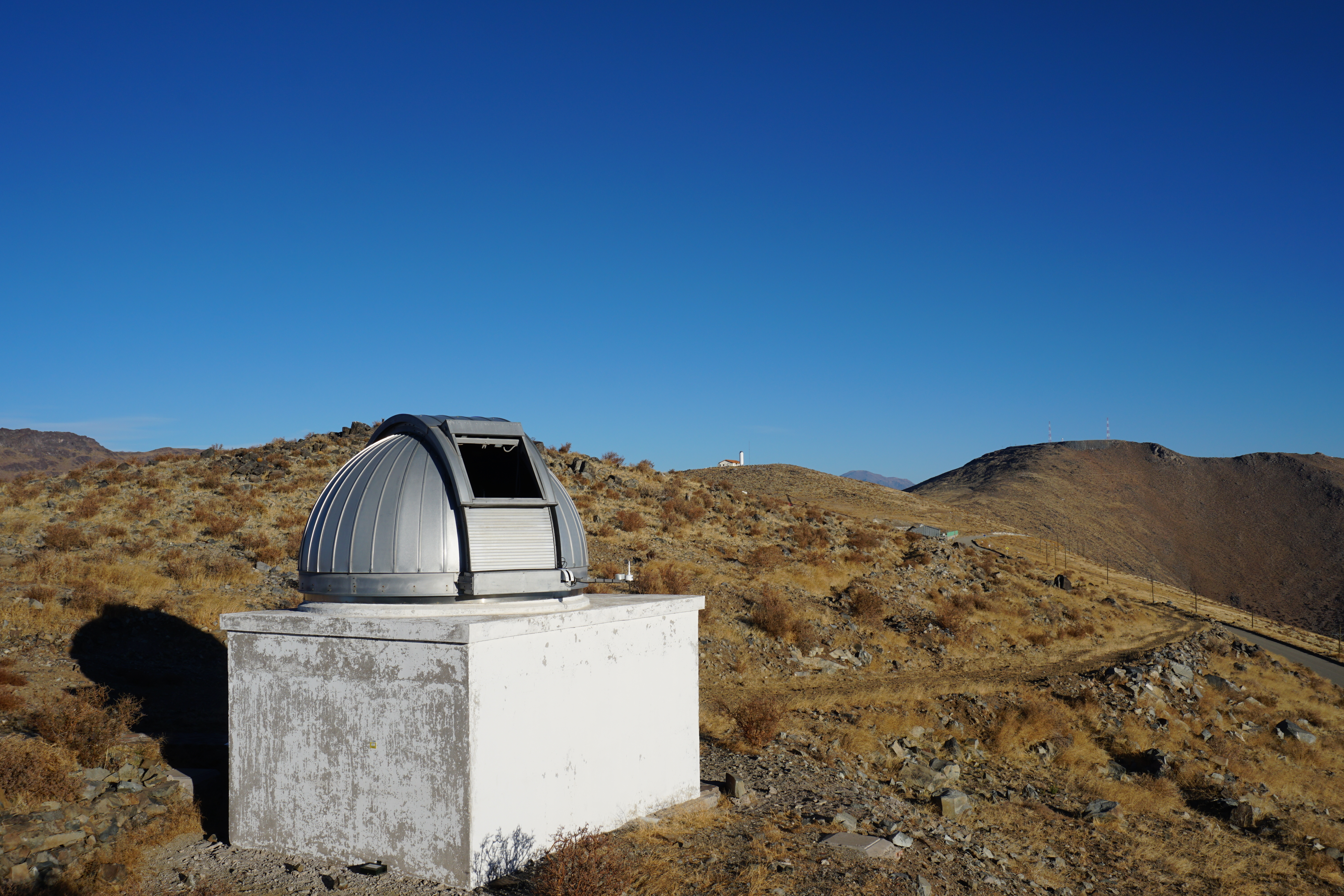
BiSON Solar Telescope

== See also ==
- List of astronomical observatories
- Mount Wilson Observatory
