= University of Central Florida College of Sciences =

Coordinates: 28°36′03″N 81°12′01″W

College of Sciences
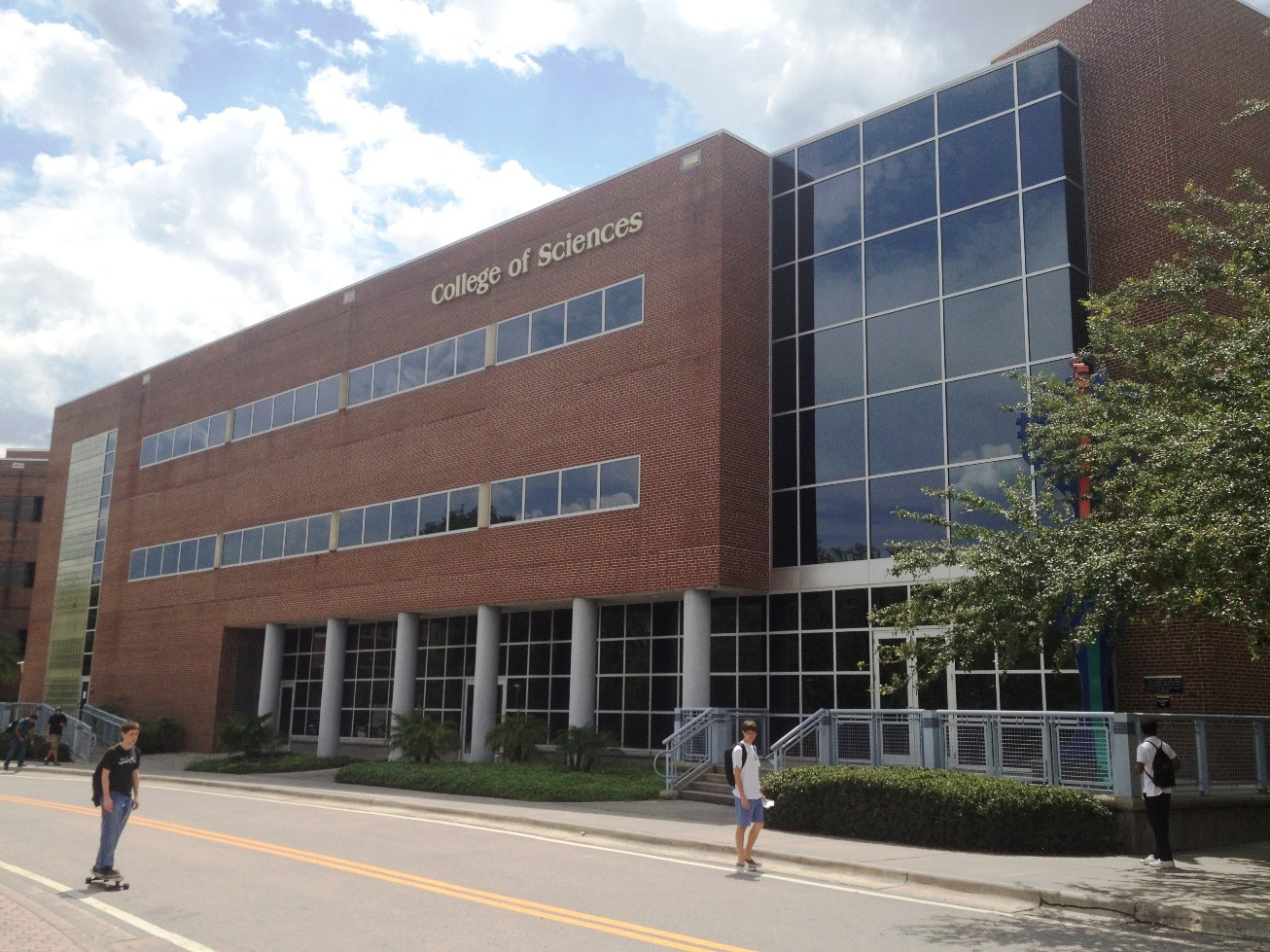
- Type: Public
- Established: 2005; 21 years ago
- Dean: Joshua Colwell, Ph.D. (Interim)
- Undergraduates: 14,994
- Postgraduates: 1,011
- Location: Orlando, Florida, United States
- Website: sciences.ucf.edu

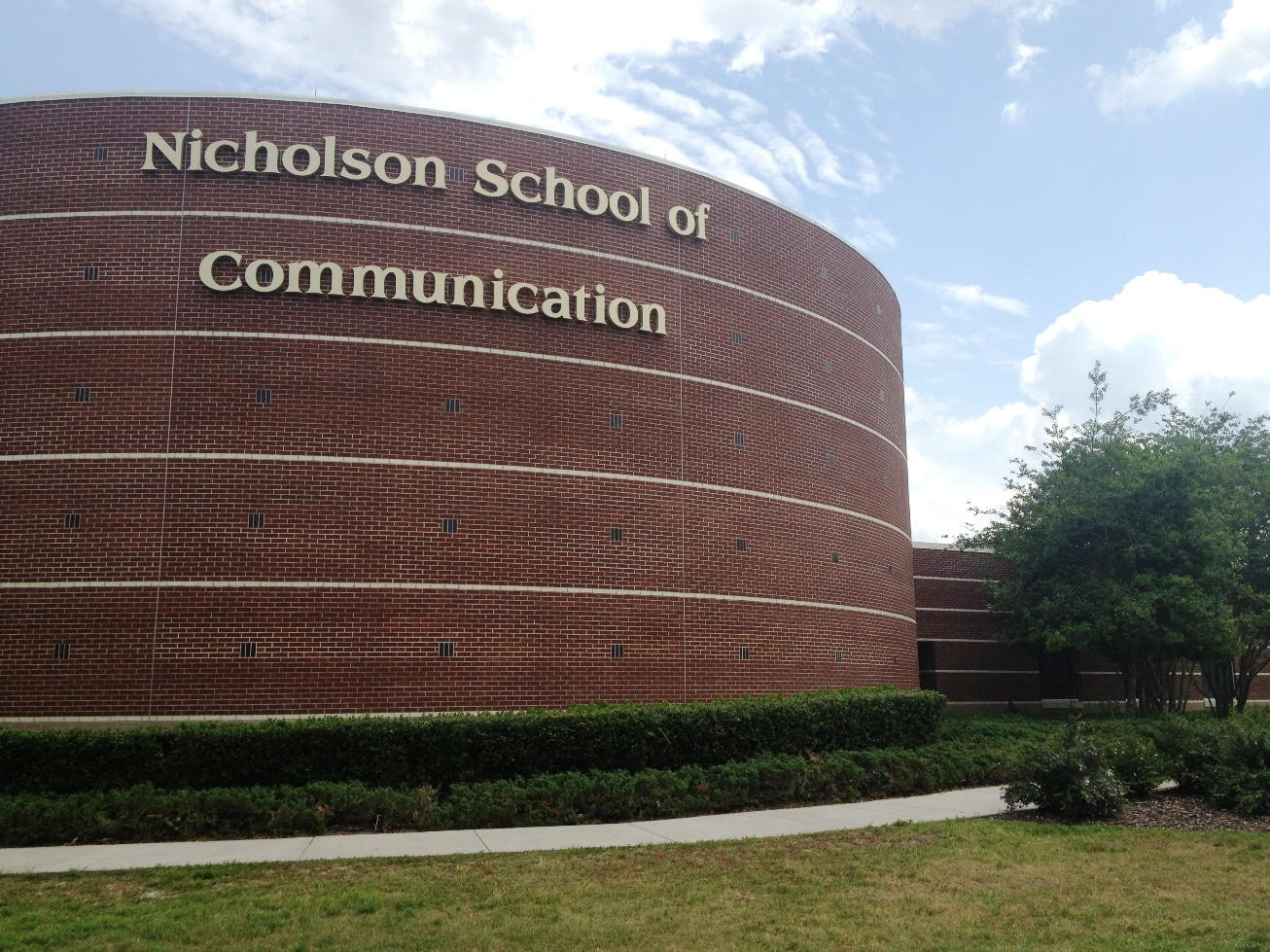
Nicholson School of Communication

The University of Central Florida College of Sciences is the largest academic college of the University of Central Florida located in Orlando, Florida, United States. From 2011 until 2020, the dean of the college was Michael Johnson, Ph.D, before he was elevated to Provost and Executive Vice President for Academic Affairs. From 2021 until 2025, the dean was Maggy Tomova, Ph.D. who left to take a new role with Agusta University in Georgia as their executive vice president for academic affairs and provost. Since 2025, the interim dean has been Joshua Colwell, Ph.D.

The College of Sciences was established in October 2005 after the division of the former College of Arts & Sciences into two separate colleges. It consists of two divisions: the Division of Natural Sciences and the Division of Social and Behavioral Sciences. The Division of Natural Sciences is home to the National Center for Forensic Science, while the division of Social and Behavioral Sciences includes the Nicholson School of Communication and Media, one of the largest schools of communication in the nation. The college is also home to the Lou Frey Institute of Politics and Government. In 2007, the college completed construction of a Psychology Building and the second phase of a new Physical Sciences Building.

== Organization ==
=== Natural Sciences ===
- Biology
- Chemistry
- Mathematics
- Physics
- Statistics and Data Science
- Actuarial Sciences

=== Social and Behavioral Sciences ===
- Anthropology
- Communication (Nicholson School of Communication and Media)
- Political Science (including Security Studies)
- Psychology
- Sociology

Notes:

- a: Denotes a program that is no longer available to incoming students due to budget cuts.
