= PROMPT Telescopes =

Gamma-ray telescope

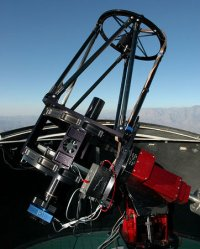
- Location: Chile
- Coordinates: 30°10′04″S 70°48′19″W
- Website: skynet.unc.edu
- Location within Chile
- Related media on Commons

PROMPT, an acronym for Panchromatic Robotic Optical Monitoring and Polarimetry Telescopes, is being built by the University of North Carolina at Chapel Hill at Cerro Tololo Inter-American Observatory (CTIO) in Chile. PROMPT's primary objective is rapid and simultaneous multiwavelength observations of gamma-ray burst afterglows, some when they are only tens of seconds old. In addition to measuring redshifts by dropout, and early-time SFDs and extinction curves of sufficiently bright afterglows in unprecedented detail, PROMPT will facilitate quick response observations at larger observatories such as the UNC-led 4.1-m SOAR Telescope. PROMPT will also serve as a platform for undergraduate and high school education throughout the State of North Carolina.

PROMPT consists of six 0.41-m Ritchey-Chrétien telescopes by RC Optical Systems on rapidly slewing (9°/sec) Paramount ME mounts by Software Bisque, each under a clamshell dome by Astro Haven. Five of these telescopes use rapid-readout (<2 sec) Alta U47+ cameras by Apogee, which make use of E2V CCDs. The sixth is being outfitted with an LN2-cooled Micro-Cam by Rockwell Scientific for NIR imaging. Each mirror and camera coating combination has been optimized for a different wavelength range, including a u-band optimized telescope. Although other filters are available, PROMPT automatically observes GRB localizations in ugriz simultaneously. The R-band telescope will additionally measure polarizations. The polarimeter was designed and built at UNC's Goodman Laboratory for Astronomical Instrumentation.

PROMPT is under the control of "Skynet," a prioritized queue scheduling system that is being developed at UNC-Chapel Hill. Skynet is written in LabView and runs on a computer at UNC's Morehead Observatory. Skynet interacts with a MySQL database and commands "Terminator" programs at each telescope. Images are automatically transferred back to a 6.5 terabyte RAID 5 with tape backup at Morehead Observatory. Users can submit jobs and retrieve data from any location via a PHP-enabled web server that interacts with the MySQL database. However, GRBs receive top priority and are automatically added to the queue via a socket connection.
