= Embry-Riddle Observatory =

Observatory in Florida, US

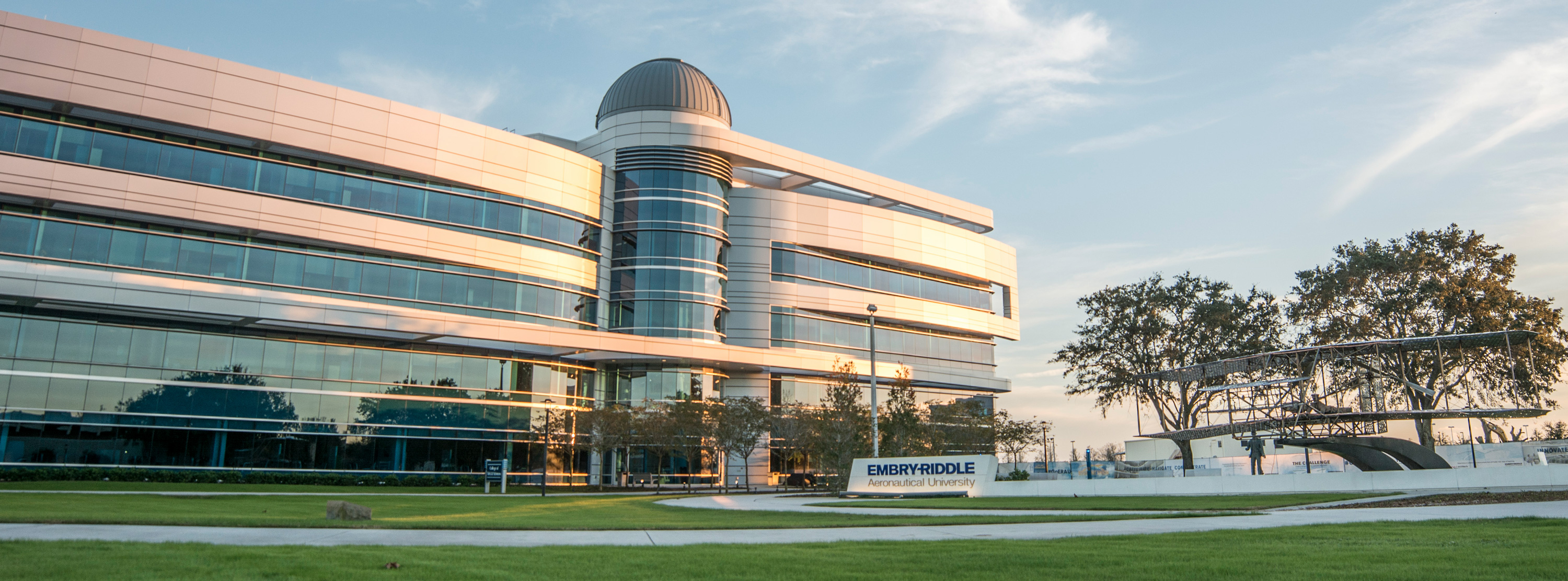
- Organization: Embry–Riddle Aeronautical University
- Location: Daytona Beach, Florida, United States
- Coordinates: 29.188183°N 81.048313°W
- Altitude: 36 m (118 ft)
- Established: 2005
- Website: daytonabeach.erau.edu/about/labs/telescope

Telescopes
- DFM: 1-meter f/8 Ritchey–Chrétien reflector from DFM Engineering
- APM: 203mm f/9 apochromat refractor from APM
- TOA-130: 130mm refractor from Takahashi
- FSQ 106: 106mm refractor from Takahashi
- CDK20: 20 inch CDK reflector from Planewave Instruments
- TOA-150: (6) 150mm refractors from Takahashi
- Heliostat: Modified Meade Instruments LX-200 mount with flat mirrors
- Related media on Commons

The Embry–Riddle Observatory is an astronomical observatory owned and operated by Embry-Riddle Aeronautical University, Daytona Beach. Hosting an array of optical instruments, this observatory is situated on the roof of the College of Arts and Sciences building in Daytona Beach, Florida.

== History ==
Embry-Riddle Observatory, originally known as Embry-Riddle Creekside Observatory, began in a Technical Innovations Pro-Dome 15 feet (4.6 m) dome located between the Lehman Engineering Building and a creek that ran through campus. In 2012, Embry-Riddle broke ground on the new 140,000 sq-ft College of Arts and Sciences building which included a 30.5 feet (9.3 m) Ash Dome on the roof. Upon completion of the building, existing telescopes were moved from the Creekside Observatory to the new building and the university installed a new 1-meter Ritchey–Chrétien telescope in June, 2014.

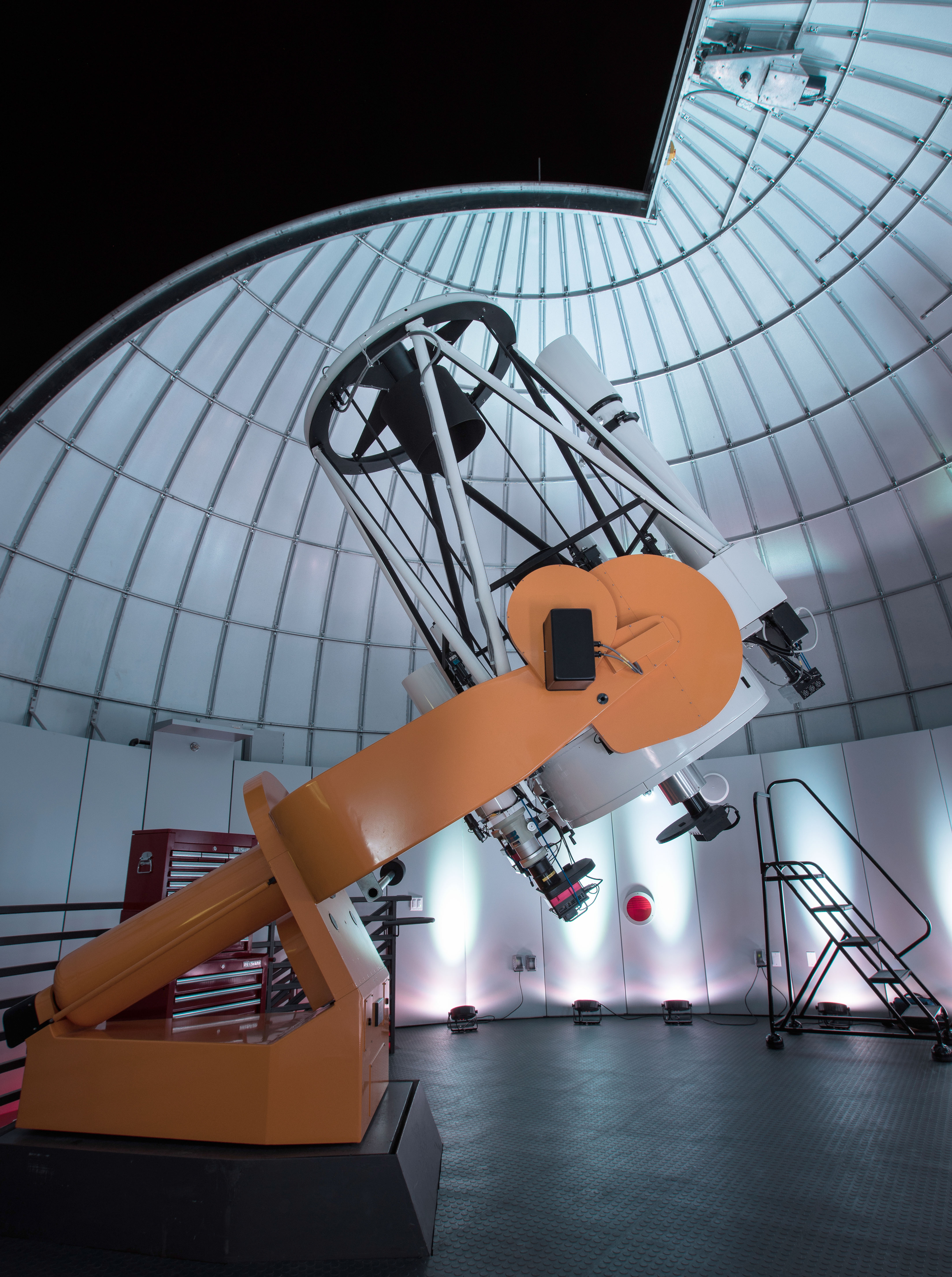
1-meter f/8 Ritchey–Chrétien reflector installed at Embry-Riddle Observatory.

== General information ==
The fifth floor of the College of Arts and Sciences building is used exclusively for astronomy and astronomical research. A rooftop veranda hosts six steel piers for supporting a fleet of Software Bisque Paramount telescope mounts. The fifth floor classroom houses the primary telescope control room and various apparati for astronomy and astrophotography instruction. A dedicated workshop holds all the eyepieces, cameras, adapters, and various support equipment needed to maintain the telescopes. The primary 30.5 feet (9.3 m) dome weighs 18,000 pounds (8,200 kg) and is elevated above the classroom. A smaller 7 feet (2.1 m) diameter dome housing a heliostat sits atop the classroom roof. The portable telescopes are stored in a dehumidified storage room on the veranda.

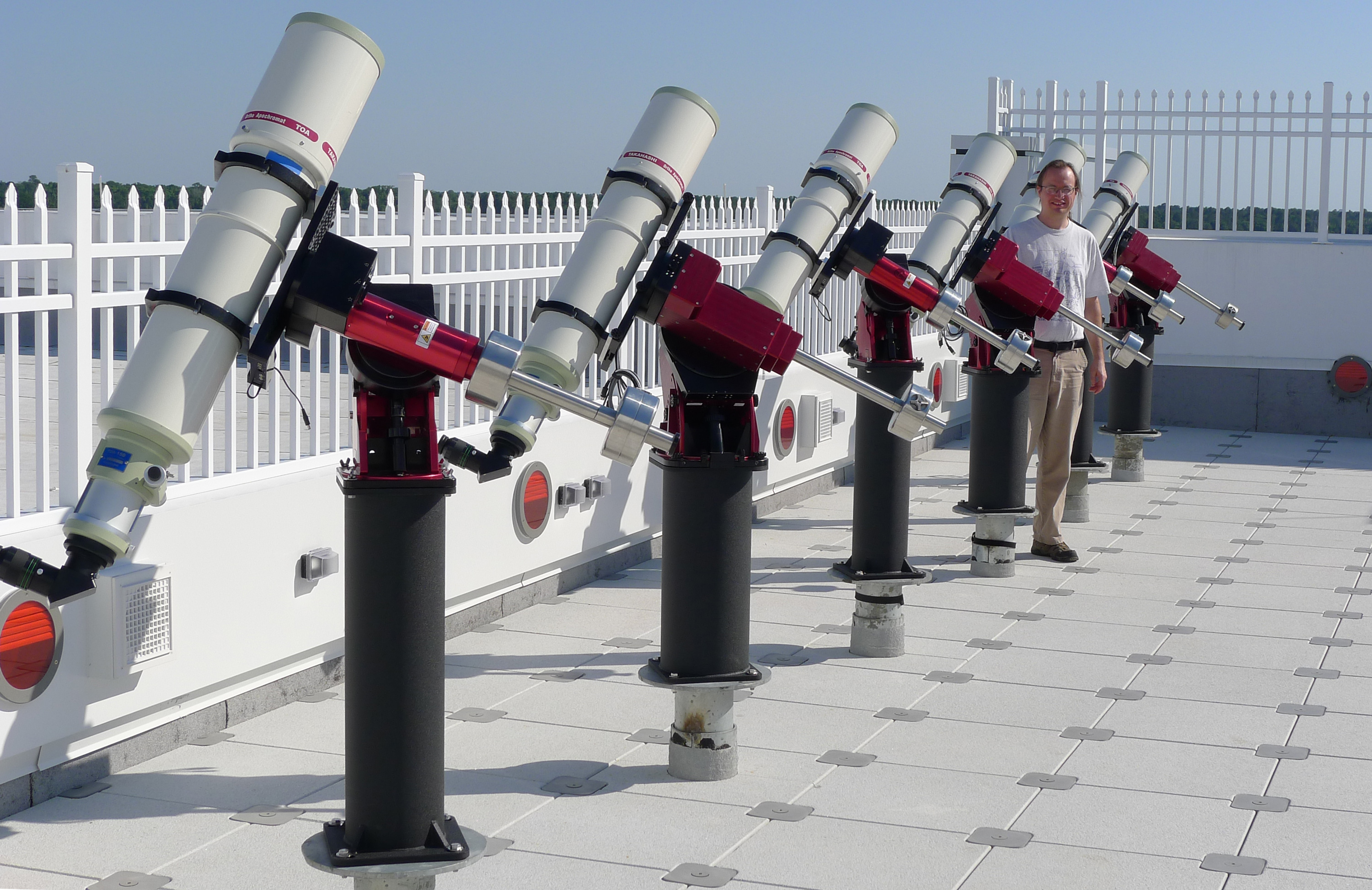
Fleet of portable telescopes on the rooftop veranda of ERAU's COAS building.

== Structural ==
The primary telescope is supported by a 4-story, 164,313 pounds (74,531 kg) steel truss located inside the building. The steel structure, designed by Leo A Daly and built by Trinity Fabricators, was erected during the early stages of the building's construction. The College of Arts and Sciences building was finished around the truss, leaving a 1 inch (2.5 cm) minimum gap between the truss and the building on all levels. The concrete pads for the truss are separated from the building foundation by insulating foam. This isolation prevents building vibrations from coupling into the telescope structure.

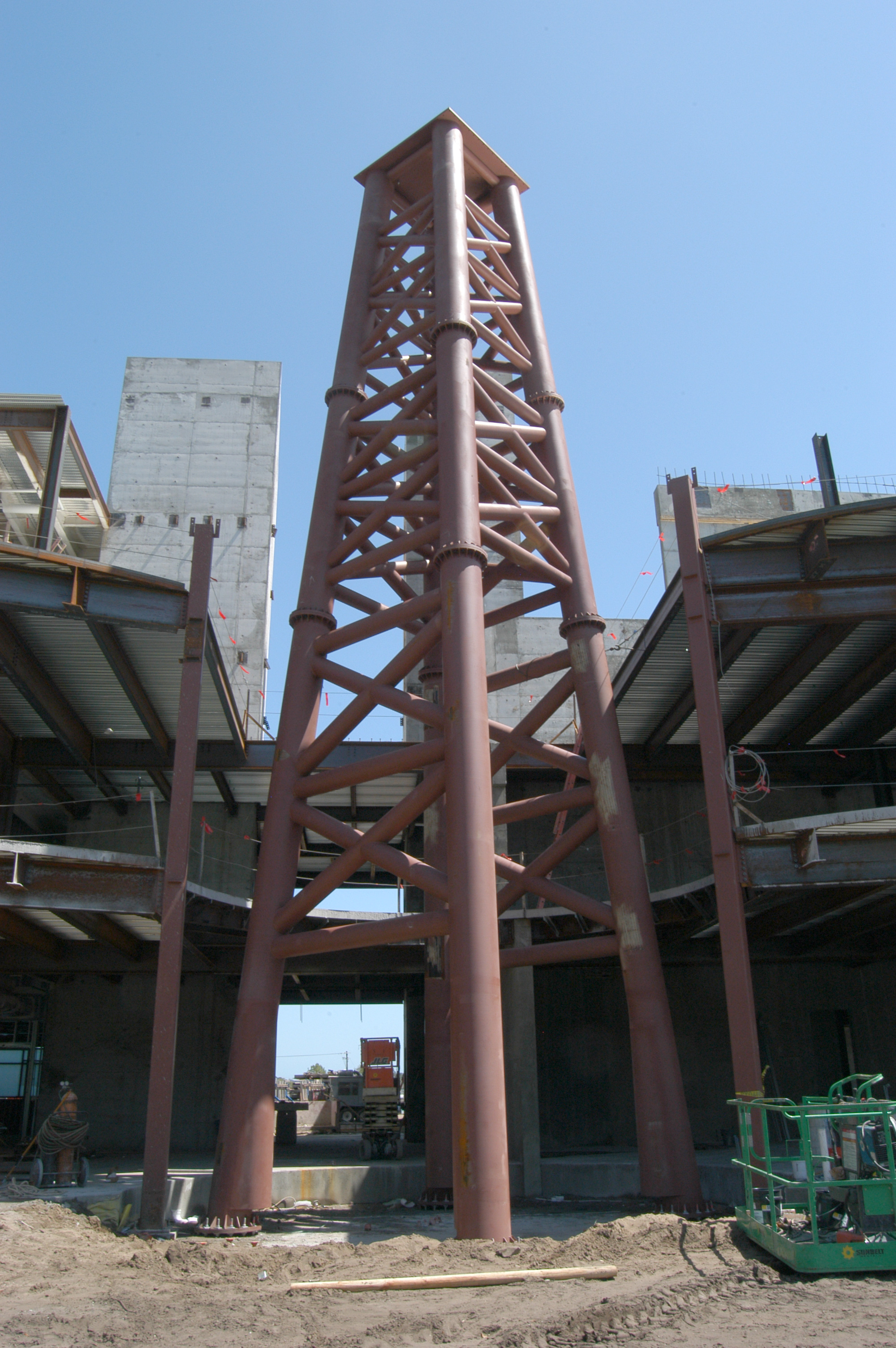
An 82-ton, 4-story steel truss securing the telescope and isolating it from the surrounding building.

== Usage ==
The Embry-Riddle Observatory is used primarily for faculty and student teaching and research. Both undergraduate and graduate teams have independent access to the observatory and its facilities. In addition to research, the observatory hosts public open house viewing nights roughly once a month during the spring and fall semesters.

== Primary ==
The primary telescope, a 100 centimetres (39 in) diameter Ritchey–Chrétien f/8 reflector from DFM Engineering, is the largest optical telescope in Florida. The 560 pounds (250 kg) astrosital primary mirror was manufactured by DFM Engineering and the Ultra low expansion glass secondary mirror was built by Brunache Instrumental Optics.

== Instruments ==
The observatory has roughly two dozen scientific grade cameras, mostly from Santa Barbara Instrument Group and Finger Lakes Instruments, with a variety of filters for supporting a wide variety of research needs. The primary instrument, a cryogenically-cooled 4k x 4k x 15 um back-thinned STA4150 CCD from Astronomical Research Cameras, is expected to be fully operational in Fall 2016. Initial testing shows dark current of 1.5 electrons per pixel per hour and less than 3 electrons read-out noise. Two SBIG STX16803 cameras attached to Takahashi piggy-back scopes provide larger field images while a Finger Lakes FLI-4022C attached to an 8 inches (20 cm) APM provides a single-shot color image matching the field of a 40mm eyepiece on the primary.

== Operation ==
The primary telescope and its three piggy-back scopes are designed to be operated from a climate-controlled room built into the 5th floor classroom. All four instruments can be operated simultaneously, either from a single computer or from separate machines. The portable veranda telescopes are designed to be operated from a user seated near each pier. A portable pier can be assembled in about 15 minutes while the primary telescope can be imaging in less than five minutes.

== See also ==
- Embry-Riddle Aeronautical University, Daytona Beach
- List of Astronomical Observatories
