= Vega–Bray Observatory =

Observatory in Cochise County, Arizona

- Organization: Astronomers Inn
- Location: Benson, Arizona (US)
- Coordinates: 31°56′27″N 110°15′27″W
- Altitude: 1,180 m (3,870 ft)

Telescopes
- Clark Telescope: 3" refractor, f10
- Meade Telescope: 12" reflector, computerised, f10
- Meade Telescope: 12" reflector, f10
- Newtonian Telescope: 18" reflector, f5.5
- Maksutov telescope: 20" reflector, f10
- Takahashi hyperbolic astrograph: 6" f3.3
- Newtonian Telescope: 14.5" reflector
- Meade Dobsonian Telescope: 16" f4.5 reflector
- Planetary telescope: 8" reflector
- Radio telescope: 12 foot parabolic reflector

Vega–Bray Observatory is an astronomical observatory owned and operated by Astronomers Inn located on a small hill overlooking the San Pedro River Valley, just east of Benson, Arizona (US). Founded in 1990 by Max Bray, an optician and Dr. Eduardo Vega, a pathologist, it is home to the Hoot–Vega Radio Telescope.

Previously known as Sky Watchers Inn, the Astronomers Inn is located next to the Vega–Bray Observatory at approximately 4,000 feet above the river valley. The Inn and Observatory were initially opened by Bray and Vega who saw the place as somewhere for friends to visit. Following the deaths of both Bray (2000) and Vega (2003), Vega’s wife sold the operation. In June 2006 the Observatory and Inn were purchased by Whetstone Development.

The Inn is home to binoculars as well as refractor and reflector telescopes ranging in sizes from 6 to 20 inches in diameter. The telescopes are either computerized or can be operated manually. The 20” Maksutov catadioptric telescope is the largest of its kind in Arizona. This telescope is permanently mounted in its own dome and is used for both star gazing and for taking digital photographs. It was built by Dr. Max Bray. Amateur astronomers assist in the use of the Observatory and its telescopes for a fee.

Other telescopes, which are not permanently mounted, are located in the main observing room which can be transformed into an open-air observatory for stargazing and observing.

The Vega–Bray Observatory is privately owned and dedicated to the education of the public. The Observatory is located just outside the town of Benson, about a two-and-a-half-hour drive from Phoenix. It attracts amateur astronomers from all over the nation. The observatory also offers its facilities to the local schools.

The Astronomers Inn, ran in conjunction with the Observatory, was a family run bed and breakfast managed by Sara and Jason Brown. It had four astronomically-based themed rooms: the Egyptian, the Garden Room, the Galaxy as well as the Astronomers Studio. It also contained a science classroom, a planetarium, a media room and a library.

In August 2009, the observatory and bed and breakfast were under new ownership. The current owners are remodeling the inn and upgrading the observatory. While currently closed to the public to accommodate the renovations, the owners plan to reopen first the observatory and, at a later date, the bed and breakfast.

== See also ==
- List of observatories
