= DFM Engineering =

American telescope and optics manufacturer

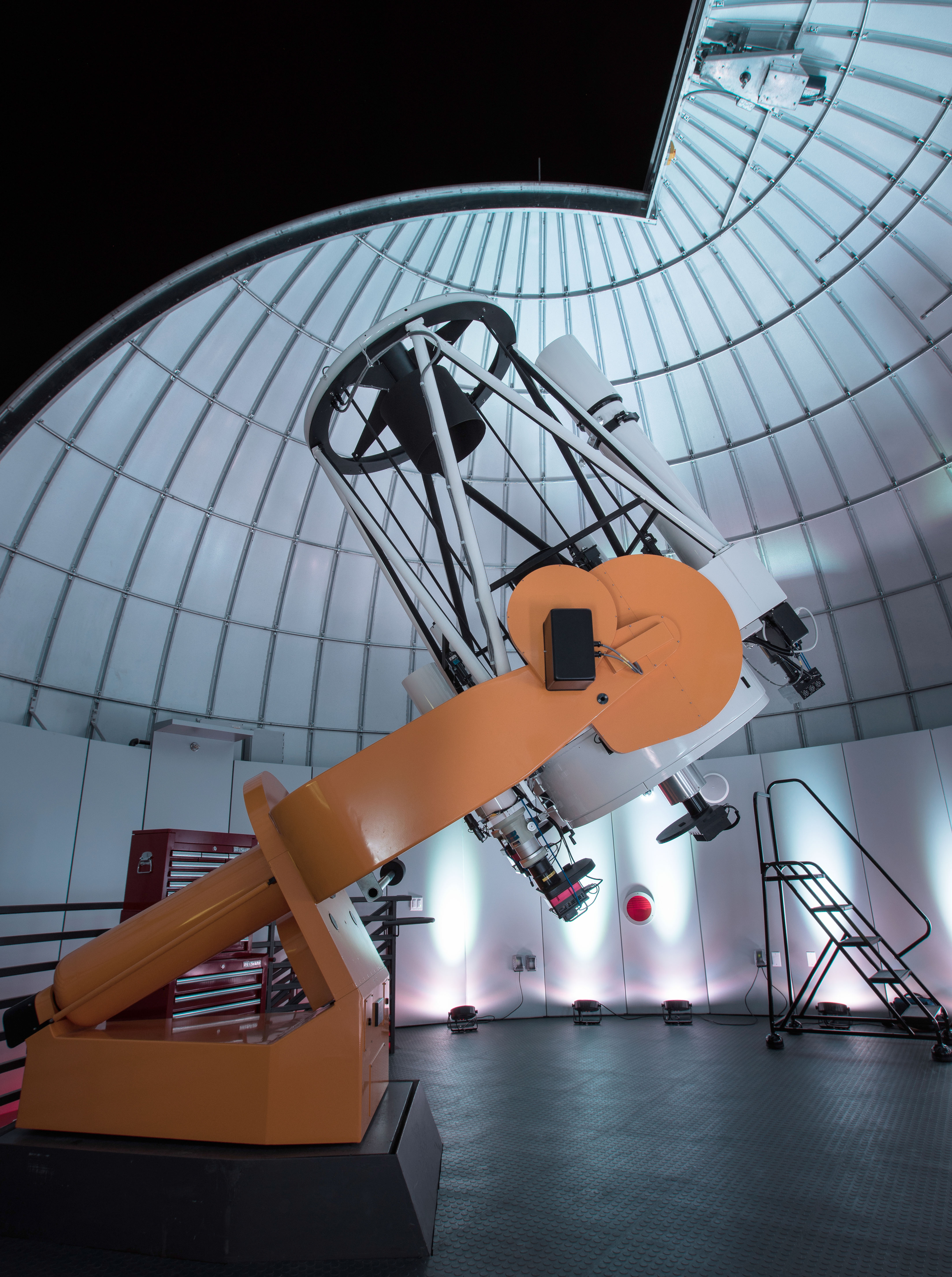
Embry-Riddle Observatory's telescope produced by DFM. This is a 1-meter, f/8, Ritchey–Chrétien design.

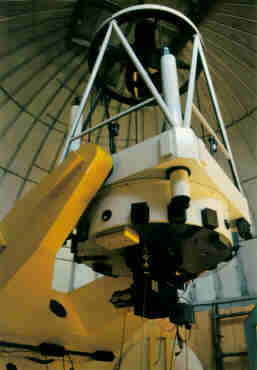
1.3 meter aperture DFM telescope at United States Naval Observatory Flagstaff Station in Arizona, with a wide field view and main mirror by Kodak and Corning

DFM Engineering is an American telescope and optics manufacturer founded in 1979 by Frank Melsheimer in Longmont, Colorado, following the successful construction of a then-novel 36-inch telescope for the Monterey Institute for Research in Astronomy. DFM makes medium size Cassegrain telescopes and their associated systems including telescope optics, control systems, and mounts. A range of pre-designed telescopes are made, as are various custom installations. DFM produces its classical Cassegrain design in various apertures from 16 inches (0.4 m) to 50 inches (1.3 m) and larger. The base DFM 16-inch (40 cm) telescope system cost roughly 94 thousand USD in 2005.

DFM produced a 1.6 m solar telescope for the Big Bear Solar Observatory. The United States Navy purchased a 1.3 m (51-inch) DFM telescope for the United States Naval Observatory Flagstaff Station in Arizona, USA.

DFM installations include many universities and institutions, including: Alfred University, Appalachian State University, Central Michigan University, Chabot Center, Clay Center-Dexter School, College of Charleston, College of Southern Idaho, University of Colorado, Dickinson College, Emory University, Embry-Riddle Aeronautical University, Daytona Beach, Florida Institute of Technology, Johns Hopkins University, Lewis & Clark College, Middlebury College, Monterey Institute for Research in Astronomy, PARI / UNCA, Rowan University, Westmont College, University of Alabama, University of Calgary, University of Victoria, University of Michigan, University of Montreal, University of Wyoming, Valdosta State University, Virginia Military Institute, Williams College, Academia Sinica Institute of Astronomy and Astrophysics, University of the Free State, and Optical Gravitational Lensing Experiment.

DFM engineering produced the telescope for the Asteroid Terrestrial-impact Last Alert System (ATLAS) project. ATLAS was funded by a grant from NASA and includes initially two telescopes set 100 miles (160 km) apart. The telescopes were tested by DFM in Colorado, U.S. in 2015 and are now operational in the Hawaiian Islands. The telescopes are designed to detect large near-Earth objects and identify those which threaten to impact Earth.

DFM also produced the telescope for Meter Class Autonomous Telescope (MCAT). MCAT is designed to look for space debris, with a wide (41 degree) field of view, f/4 optics, and 1.4 m aperture. It is a reflecting telescope on a double horseshoe mount. MCAT is located on Ascension Island in the South Atlantic Ocean.
