= Falera =

- Municipality
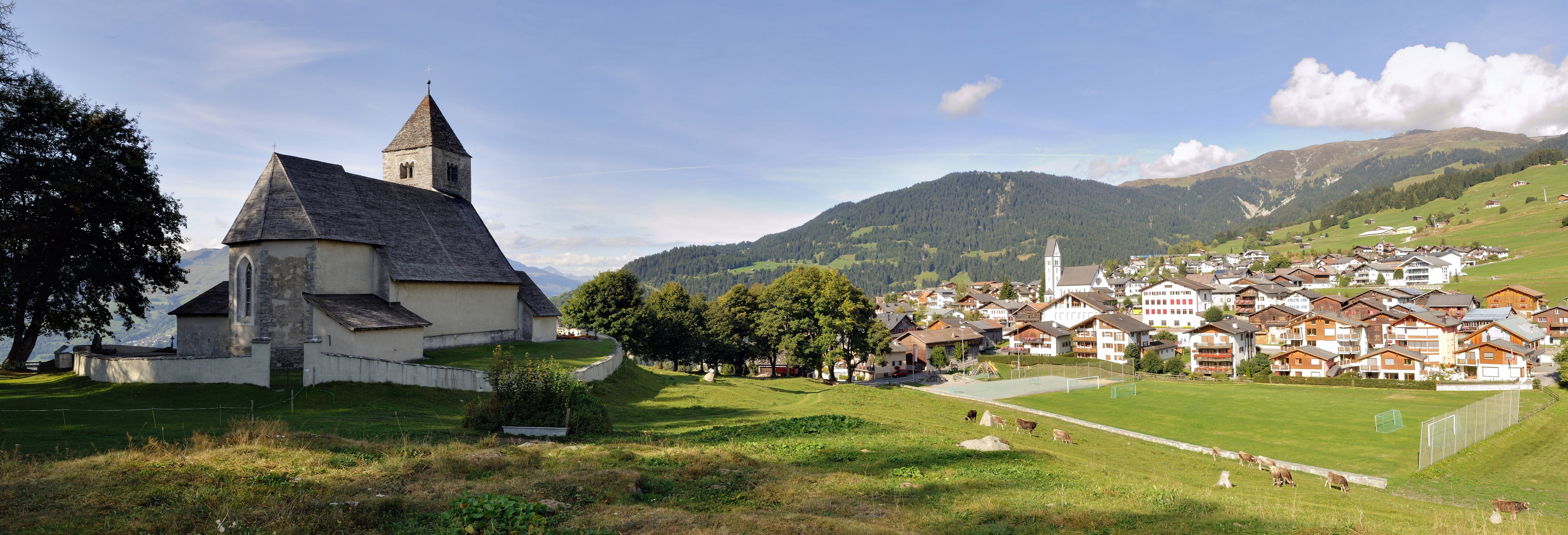

- Flag Coat of arms
- Location of Falera
- Location within Switzerland Location within Canton of Grisons
- Coordinates: 46°48′N 9°13′E
- Country: Switzerland
- Canton: Grisons
- District: Surselva

Area
  - Total: 22.35 km^{2} (8.63 sq mi)
- Elevation: 1,220 m (4,000 ft)

Population (December 2015)
  - Total: 614
  - Density: 27.5/km^{2} (71.2/sq mi)
- Time zone: UTC+01:00 (CET)
  - Summer (DST): UTC+02:00 (CEST)
- Postal code: 7153
- SFOS number: 3572
- ISO 3166 code: CH-GR
- Surrounded by: Laax, Ladir, Ruschein, Sagogn, Schluein, Schnaus
- Website: www.falera.net

Falera is a municipality in the Surselva Region in the Swiss canton of the Grisons.

Falera is a part of the Alpenarena along with the towns of Flims and Laax and is the most secluded of the three.

== History ==
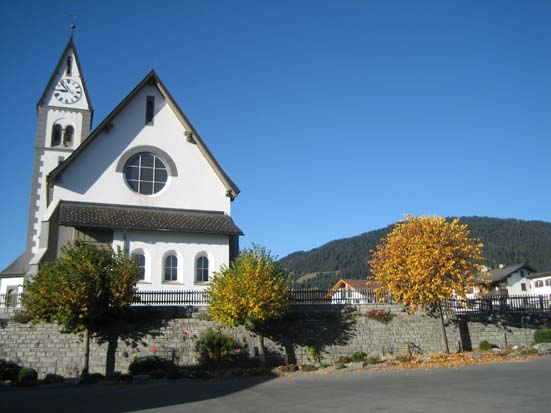
Herz-Jesu-Kirche or "Sacred Heart of Jesus Church"

Aerial view from 400 m by Walter Mittelholzer (1923)

Falera is a town of rich culture and history. In 1800 B.C., a settlement was started on the Mutta. This came during the Bronze Age and was very significant in the early development of what today is Switzerland. The village is first mentioned in 765 as Falariae. While the first actual mention of a church in Falera was in 840-841. However, the current church was not built until 1491. The church was built on the foot of the Mutta and was named after St. Remigius. Around the church are stone pillars (megaliths or menhirs), arranged geometrically, that are said to date around 1500 B.C.

Later, in the year 1903, another church was built. This church was built directly in the village and was named the Herz-Jesu-Kirche or "Heart of Jesus Church" . It, along with the original Falera church, are still standing today and the main attractions of Falera.

=== Falera today ===
Today, Falera is mostly overshadowed by the other two villages of the Alpenarena: Laax and Flims. Most people that have apartments in Falera do not live there year-round, but rather use them as vacation homes and weekend trips. The main language spoken is Romansh, a Romance language that is said to have descended from vulgar Latin.

The Sternwarte Mirasteilas, an astronomical observatory, was established by José De Queiroz in 2006.

== Geography ==
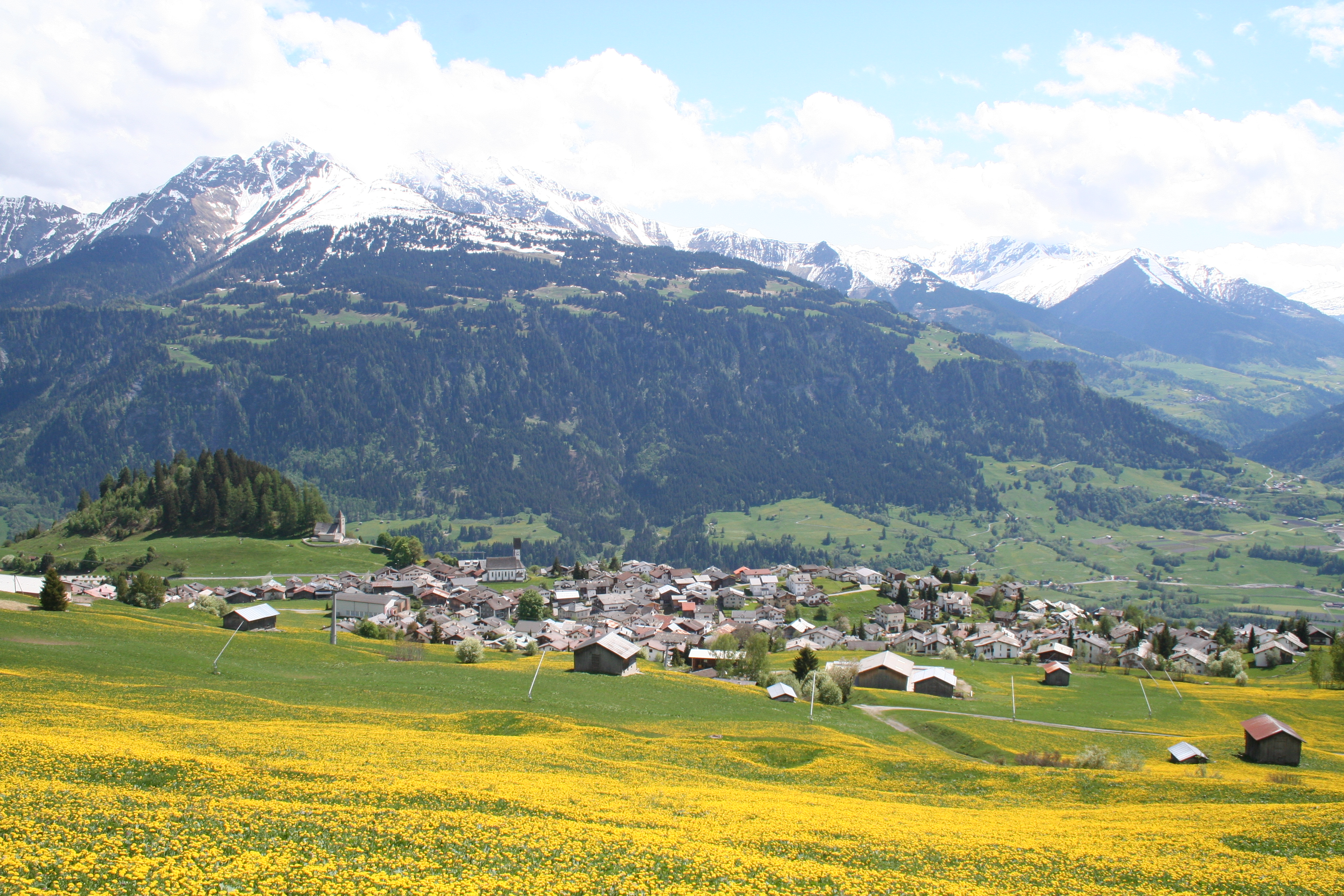
Village of Falera

Falera has an area, (as of the 2004/09 survey) of 22.36 km^{2} (8.63 sq mi). Of this area, about 60.0% is used for agricultural purposes, while 20.0% is forested. Of the rest of the land, 2.6% is settled (buildings or roads) and 17.3% is unproductive land. In the 2004/09 survey a total of 37 ha (91 acres) or about 1.7% of the total area was covered with buildings, an increase of 12 ha (30 acres) over the 1984/85 amount. Of the agricultural land, 394 ha (970 acres) is fields and grasslands and 1,035 ha (2,560 acres) consists of alpine grazing areas. Since 1984/85 the amount of agricultural land has decreased by 100 ha (250 acres). Over the same time period the amount of forested land has increased by 40 ha (99 acres). Rivers and lakes cover 17 ha (42 acres) in the municipality.

Before 2017, the municipality was located in the Ilanz sub-district of the Surselva district, after 2017 it became part of the Surselva Region. It is located on a terrace above the left bank of the Vorderrhein river at an elevation of 1,218 m (3,996 ft). Until 1969 Falera was known as Fellers.

== Demographics ==
Falera has a population (as of December 2020) of 625. As of 2017, 13.6% of the population are resident foreign nationals. In 2015 a small minority (63 or 10.3% of the population) was born in Portugal. Over the last 7 years (2010-2017) the population has changed at a rate of 7.60%. The birth rate in the municipality, in 2017, was 11.4, while the death rate was 3.2 per thousand residents.

As of 2017, children and teenagers (0–19 years old) make up 18.5% of the population, while adults (20–64 years old) are 54.7% of the population and seniors (over 64 years old) make up 26.8%. In 2015 there were 244 single residents, 326 people who were married or in a civil partnership, 18 widows or widowers and 26 divorced residents.

In 2017 there were 268 private households in Falera with an average household size of 2.32 persons. In 2015 about 23.7% of all buildings in the municipality were single family homes, which is much less than the percentage in the canton (49.4%) and much less than the percentage nationally (57.4%). Of the 321 inhabited buildings in the municipality, in 2000, about 30.5% were single family homes and 59.8% were multiple family buildings. Additionally, about 17.1% of the buildings were built before 1919, while 17.8% were built between 1991 and 2000. In 2016 the rate of construction of new housing units per 1000 residents was 11.4. The vacancy rate for the municipality, in 2018, was 1.04%.

The historical population is given in the following chart:

== Economy ==
Falera is classed as a semitourist community.

As of 2016, there were a total of 173 people employed in the municipality. Of these, a total of 31 people worked in 11 businesses in the primary economic sector. The secondary sector employed 64 workers, of which 54 people worked for one business. Finally, the tertiary sector provided 78 jobs in 22 businesses.

In 2017 a total of 11.4% of the population received social assistance. In 2011 the unemployment rate in the municipality was 1.3%.

In 2015 the average cantonal, municipal and church tax rate in the municipality for a couple with two children making SFr 80,000 was 3.2% while the rate for a single person making SFr 150,000 was 13.8%. The canton has an average tax rate for those making SFr 80,000 and an average rate for those making SFr 150,000. In 2013 the average income in the municipality per tax payer was SFr 54,054 and the per person average was SFr 36,855, which is less than the cantonal average of SFr 69,964 but greater than the per person amount of SFr 33,075. It is also less than the national per tax payer average of SFr 82,682 but greater than the per person average of SFr 35,825.

== Politics ==
In the 2019 federal election the most popular party was the CVP with 45.4% of the vote. The next three most popular parties were the SVP (29.3%), the GLP (7.8%) and the FDP (7.2%). In the federal election, a total of 260 votes were cast, and the voter turnout was 57.3%.

== Languages ==
Most of the population (as of 2000) speaks Romansh (67.5%), with German being second most common (28.8%) and Italian being third (2.0%). Until the late 20th Century, the entire population spoke the Romansh dialect of Surselvisch. In 1880 about 99% spoke Romansh as a first language, while in 1941 it was 97% and in 2000 it had decreased to 67%. In 1990 about 90% of the population understood Romansh and in 2000 it was 78%.

Languages in Falera
Languages	Census 1980		Census 1990		Census 2000	
Languages	Number	Percent	Number	Percent	Number	Percent
German	42	10.97%	71	17.57%	145	28.77%
Romansh	309	80.68%	327	80.94%	340	67.46%
Italian	7	1.83%	3	0.74%	10	1.98%
Population	383	100%	404	100%	504	100%

End of 2013, 381 persons, 64.4% are of Romansh mother tongue, 145 persons, 24.5% are of German mother tongue and 66 persons, 11.1% indicate other languages as mother tongue.

== Religion ==
From the 2000 census 84% are Roman Catholic, while 10% belonged to the Swiss Reformed Church and 1% that are Orthodox. About 0.6% did not answer the question.

== Heritage sites of national significance ==
The Church of S. Rumetg/St. Remigius and the Muota/Mutta and Planezzas (prehistoric settlements and megalith sites) are listed as Swiss heritage sites of national significance.

Church St. Remigius and Menhirs near Falera

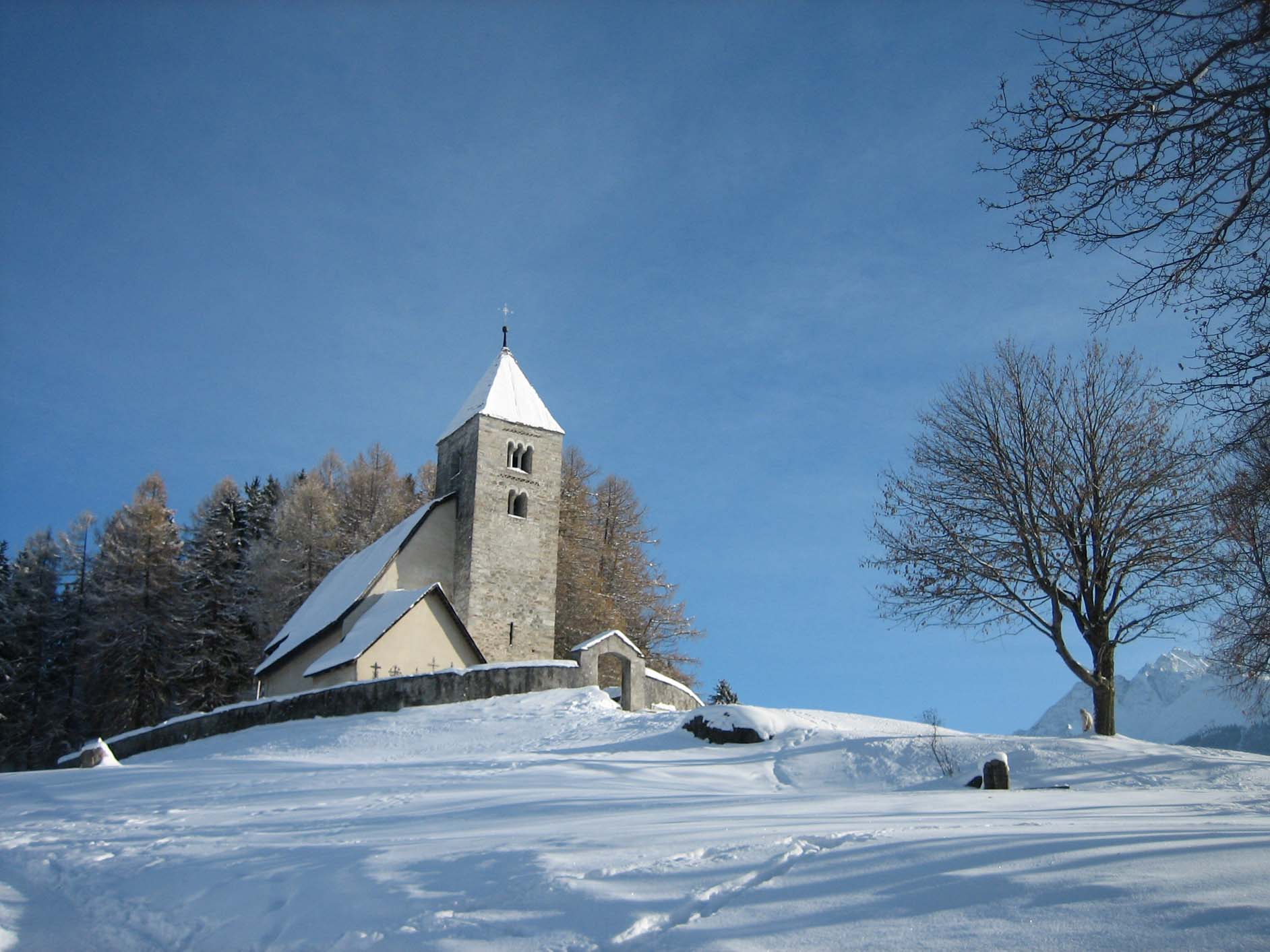
St. Remigius

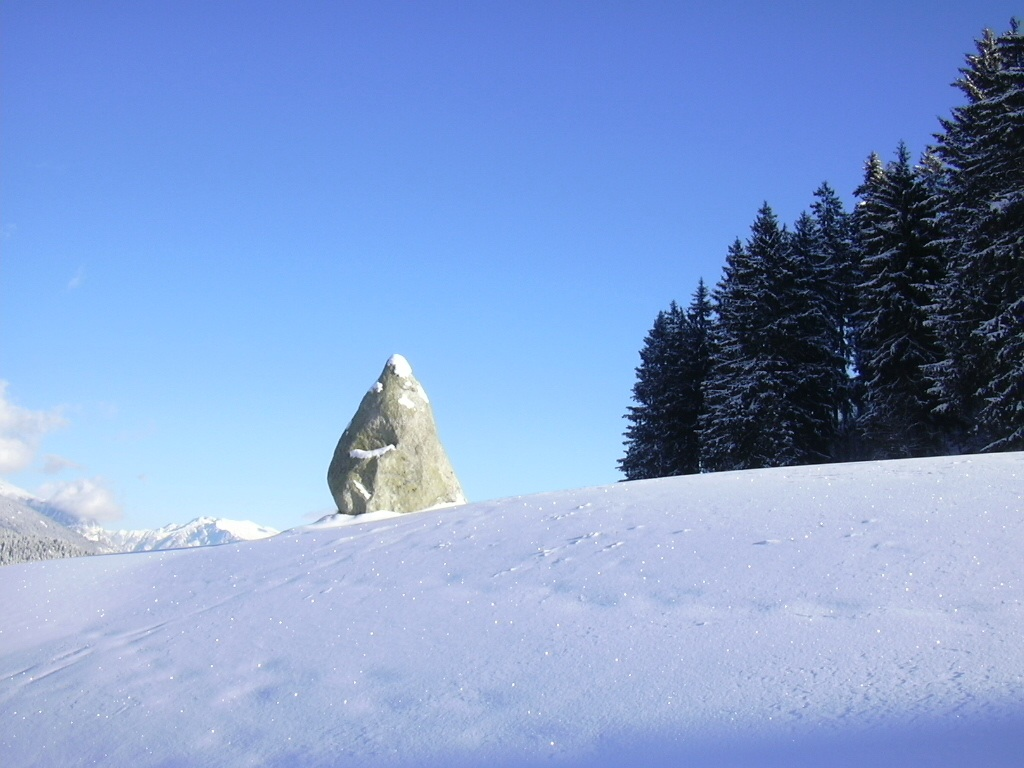
Menhir

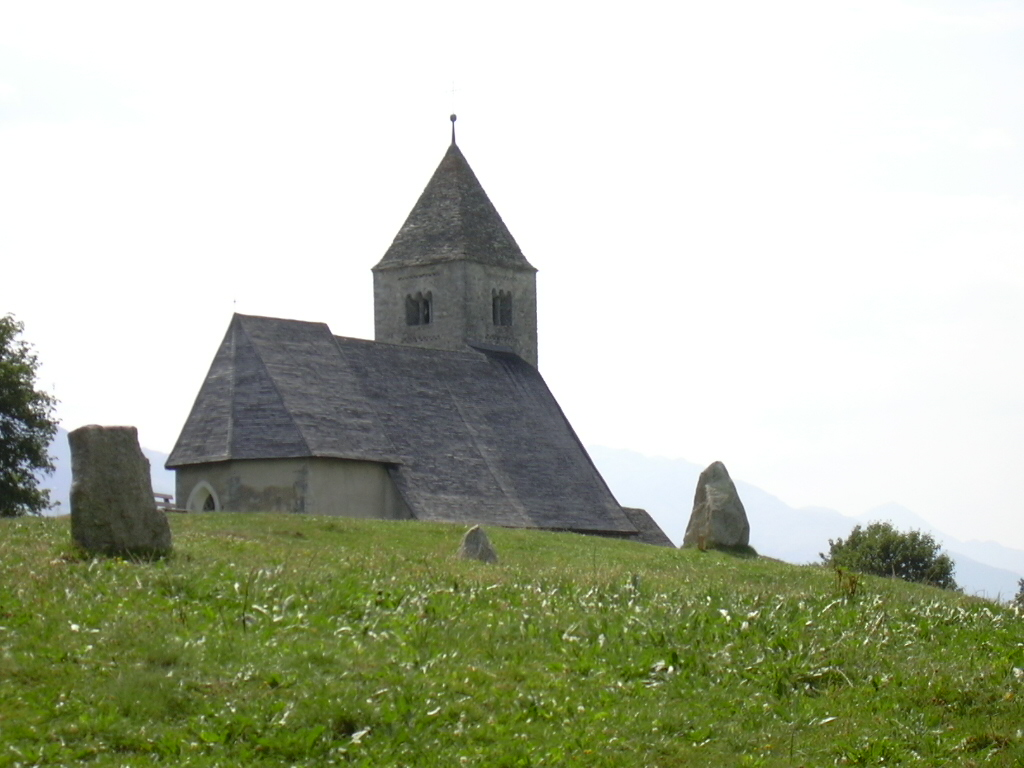
Menhirs near St. Remigius

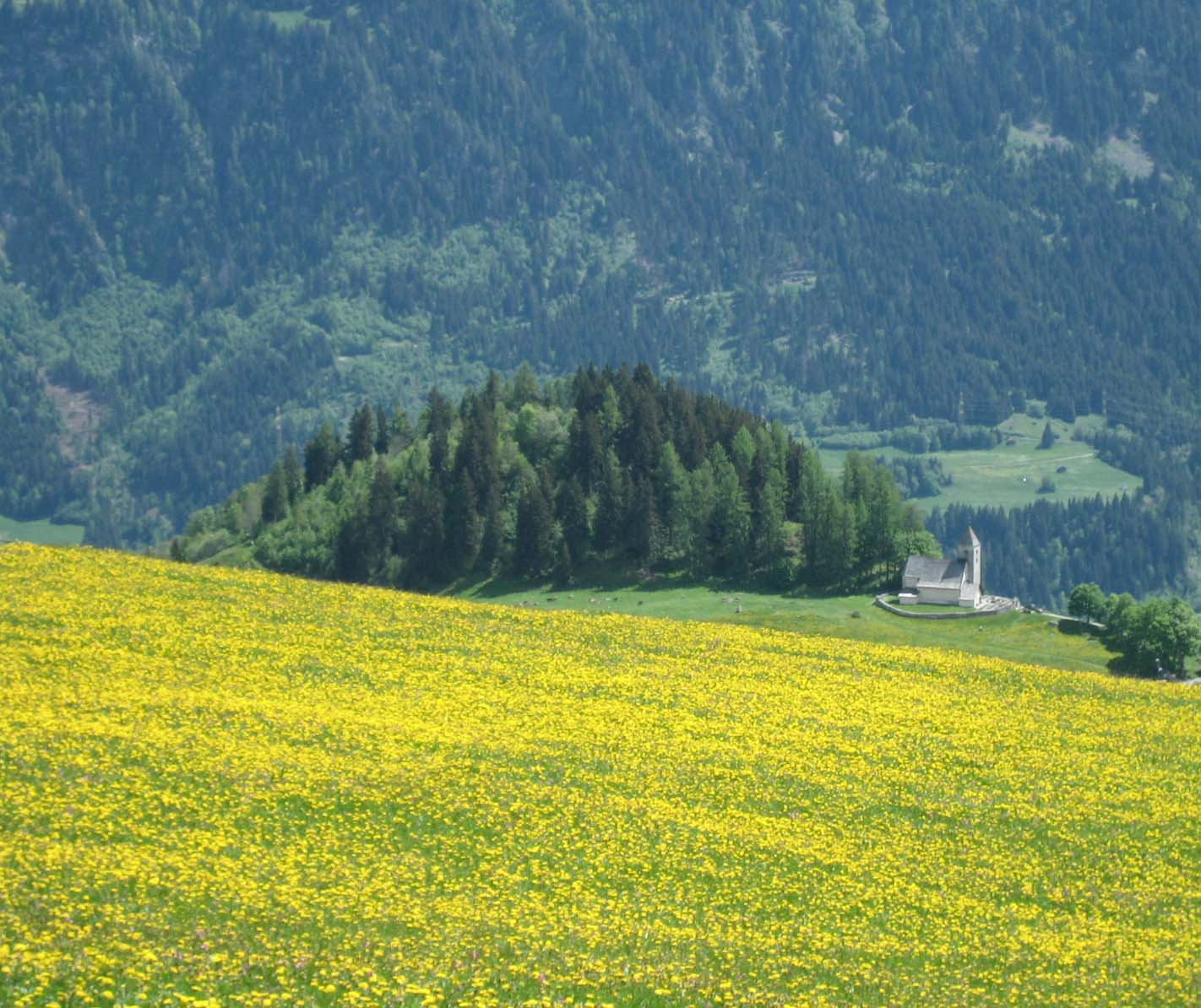
The Mutta and St. Remigius

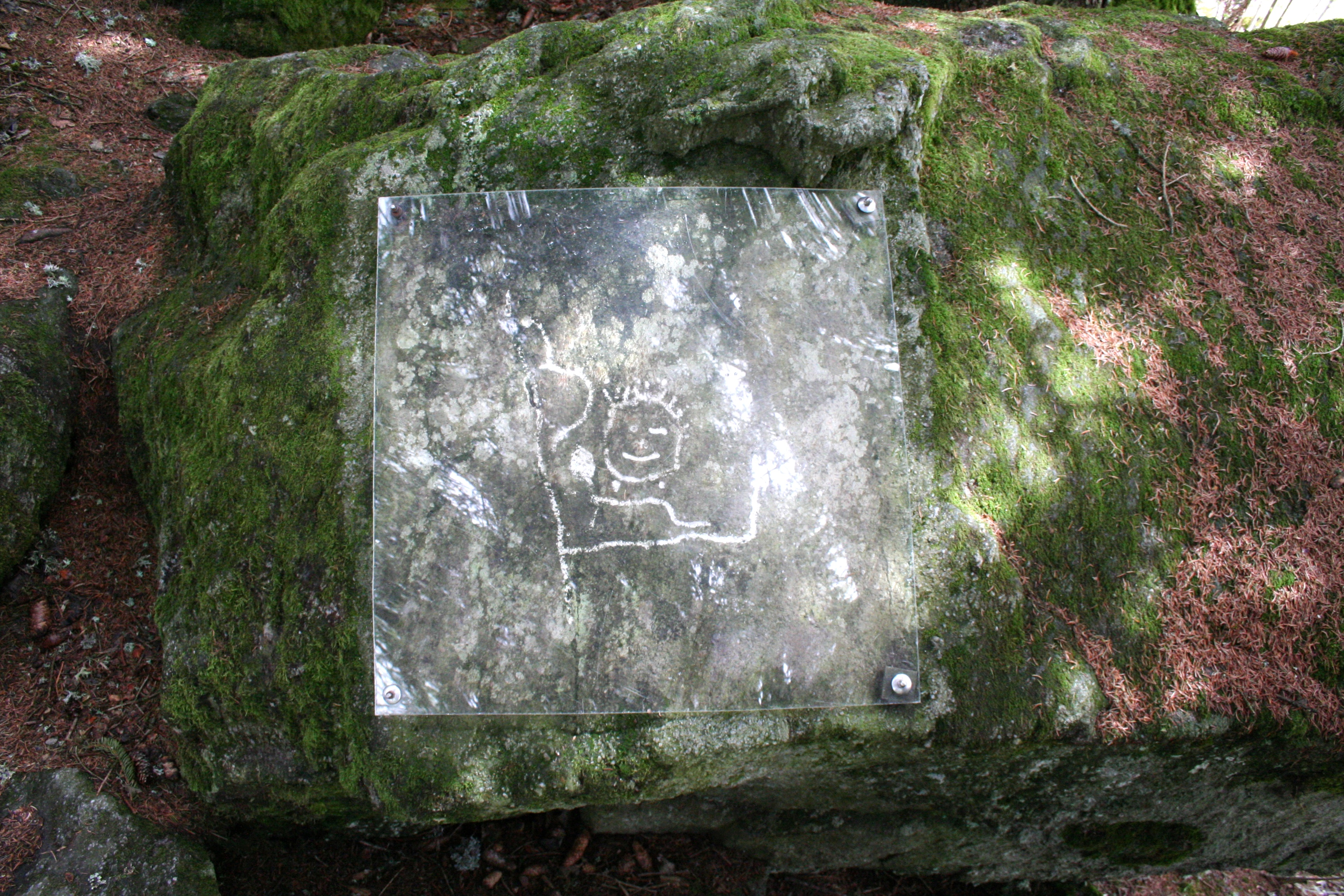
Petroglyph from the megalith site

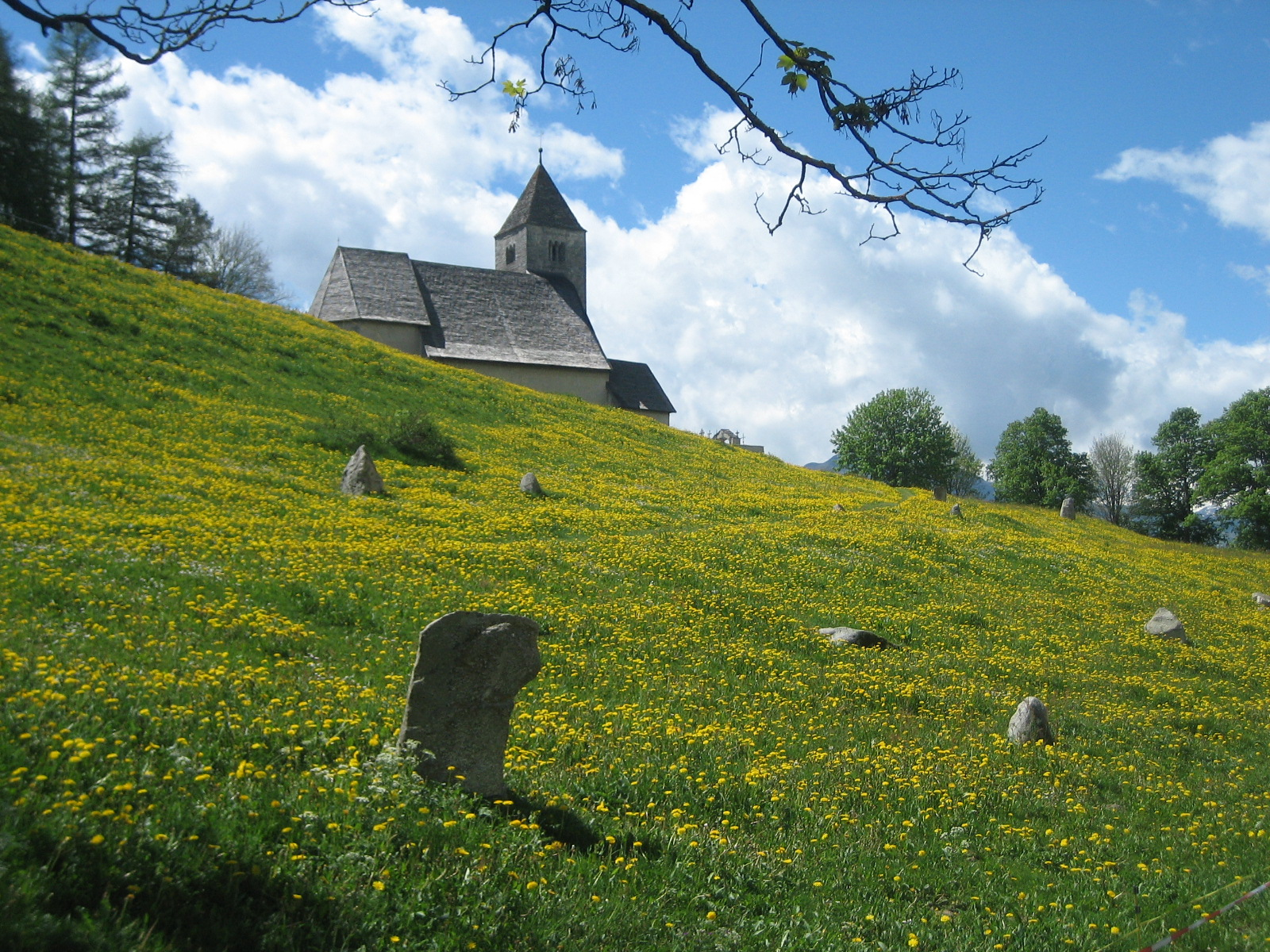
Menhir or standing stone (Megalith) with the Church of San Remigius

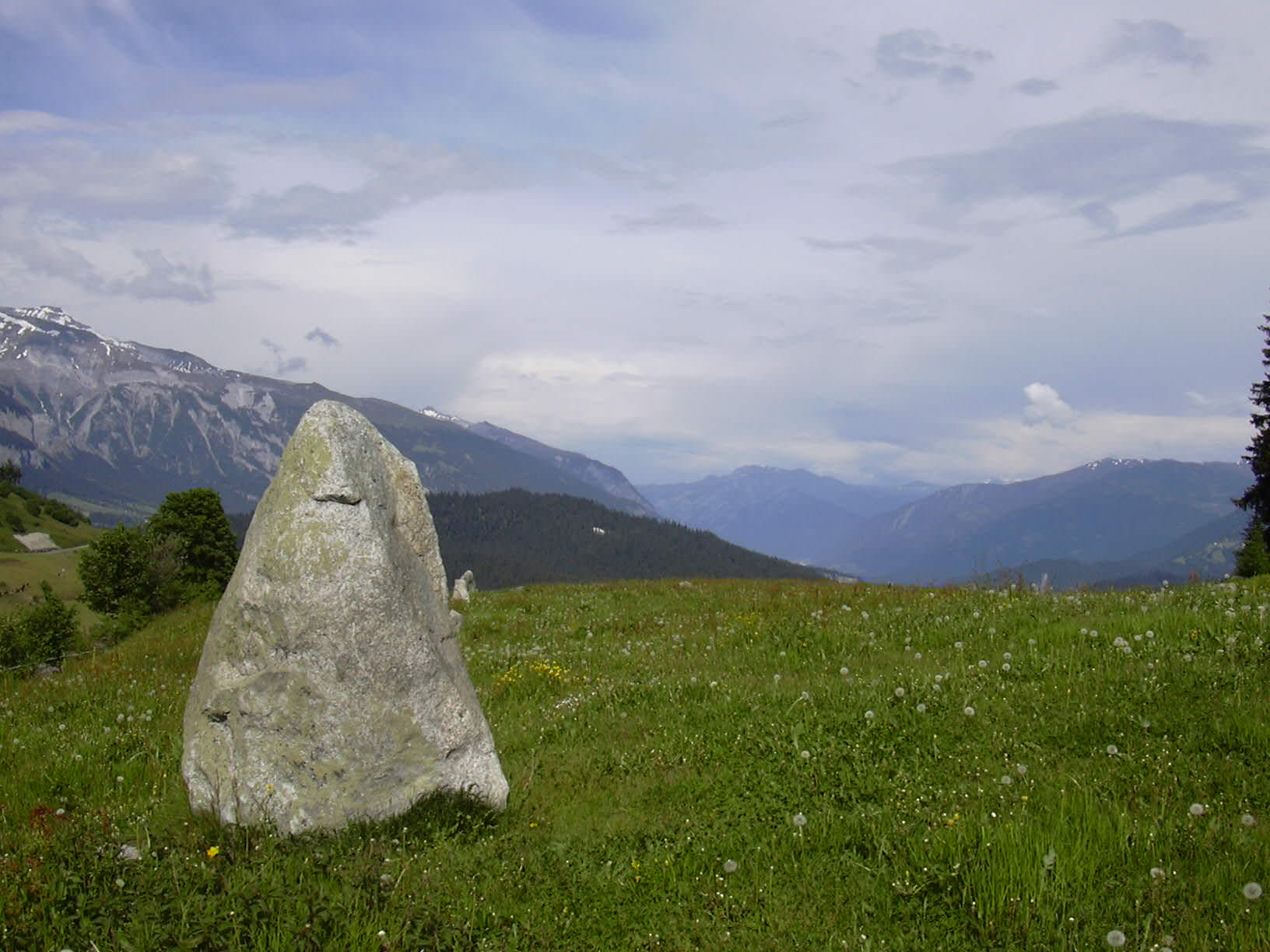
Standing stone near Falera
