= Takahashi Seisakusho =

Japanese manufacturer of telescopes and related equipment

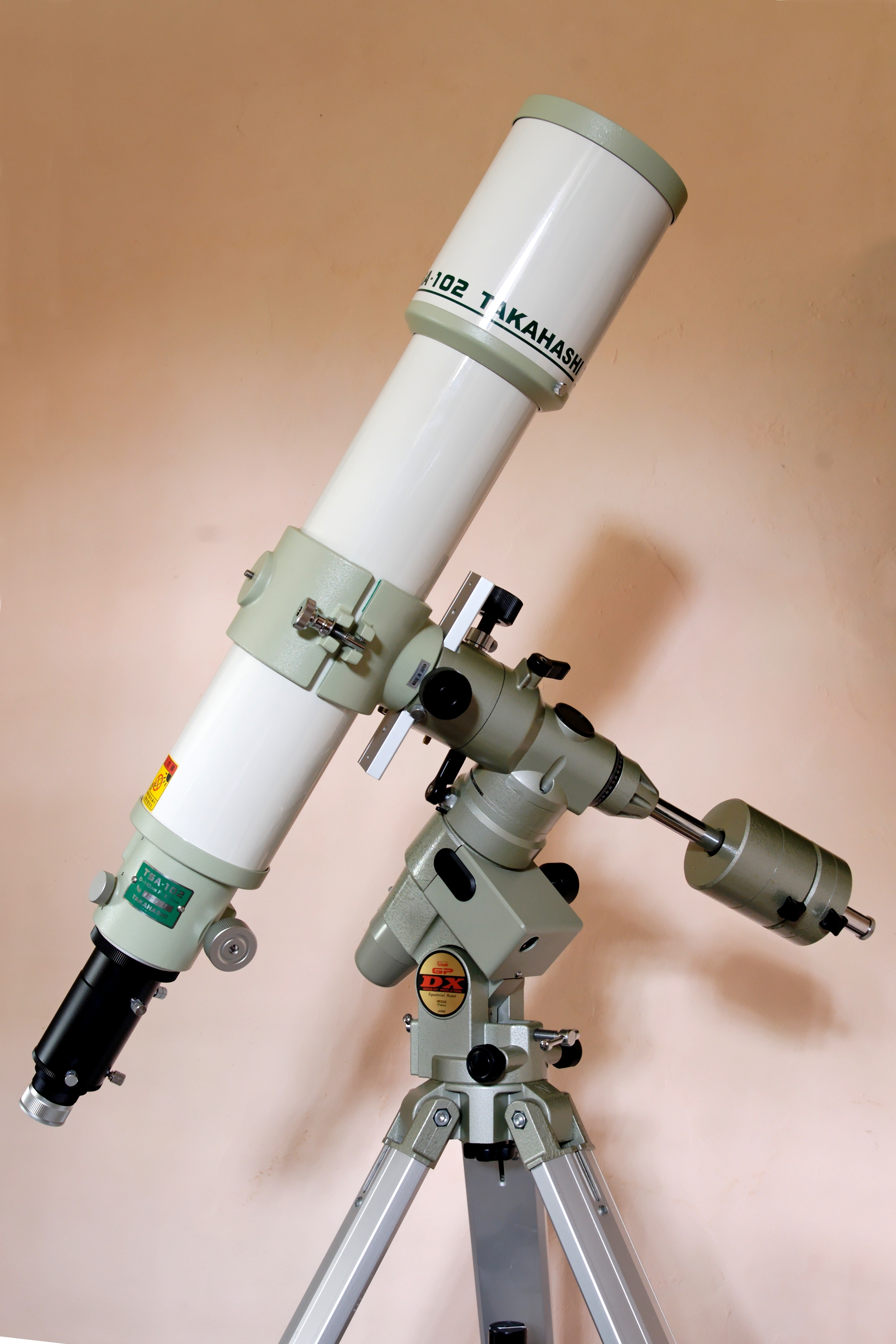

Takahashi Seisakusho Ltd. (株式会社高橋製作所) is a Japanese manufacturer of telescopes and related equipment (such as eyepieces and equatorial mounts) founded in 1932 by Kitaro Takahashi in Tokyo. Originally started as a foundry, Takahashi began manufacturing optical equipment after WWII in 1946.

Often known simply as 'Tak', the brand is especially noted amongst amateur astronomers for its range of apochromatic refractors, but also produces various types of reflectors, and instruments featuring compound optics. All Takahashi telescopes and mounts are made in Japan using traditional manufacturing methods, such as sand casting, with nearly all parts made in-house.

Takahashi pioneered the use of fluorite crystal in place of one of the glass elements in the objective lens of an astronomical telescope, although this material had previously been used in other optical devices. The company's name would become synonymous with the use of this type of crystal.

In recent years however, Takahashi has produced some telescopes using extra-low dispersion ("ED") FPL-53 glass in place of fluorite in the objective lens.

High-performance glass that contains fluorine should not be confused with fluorite crystal, which is not glass.

Some other telescope manufacturers use Takahashi refractors as collimating instruments for larger telescopes. Takahashi telescopes of various designs and sizes are installed in major observatories, such as Embry-Riddle Observatory, Hoober Observatory, Mirasteilas Observatory, Vega–Bray Observatory and others.
