= José De Queiroz =

Portuguese-born Swiss amateur astronomer

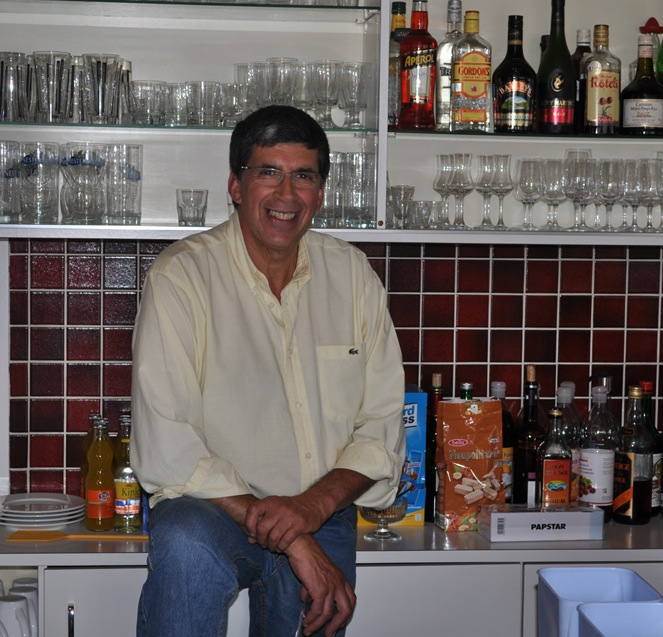
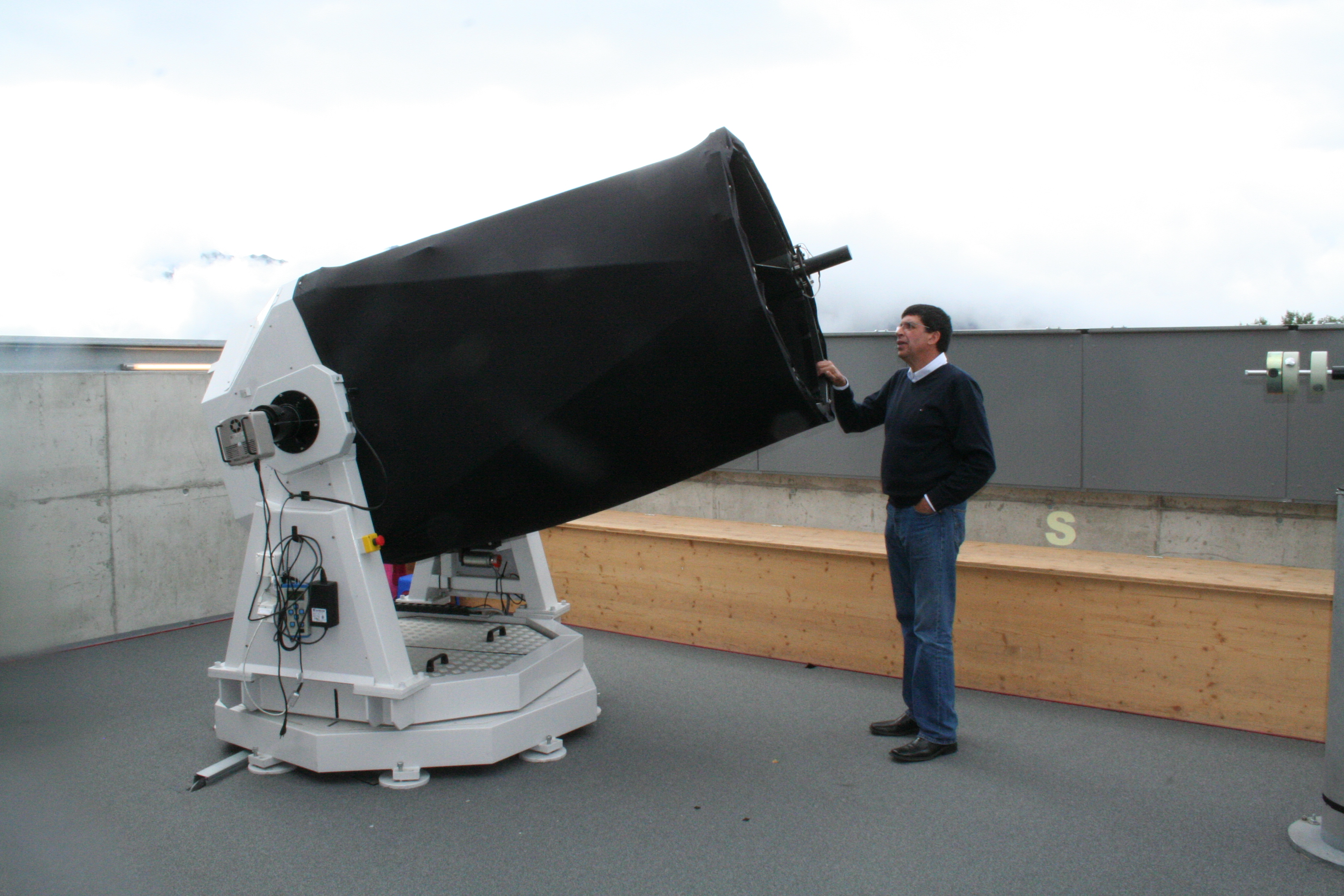
José De Queiroz in his Restaurant "Encarna" (left) and next to his 0.9-meter Cassegrain telescope

José De Queiroz (born 9 August 1954) is a Portuguese-born, Swiss amateur astronomer and discoverer of minor planets, as well as a restaurant manager in Falera in the Swiss canton of Graubünden.

== Career ==
Queiroz was born in Lisbon. In 1956 the family moved to Braga in northern Portugal, where José frequented school. Once graduated from a technical school, he then studied chemistry at the Instituto Superior de Engenharia in Porto. After the Carnation Revolution, José no longer felt at ease in Portugal and left the country in summer of 1974 for Switzerland.

Thanks to his knowledge of languages he found a job in Ormont-Dessus, in a holiday home as a caregiver for children of wealthy parents from all over the world. After a year, however, he started to work in the tourism industry. Following several years of working as a waiter in various hotels in the canton of Vaud and in the Bernese Oberland he came to Lenzerheide in the Grisons, where he worked at the hotel "Guardaval Sporz". At the same time he attended the Hotel Management School of Alpine Hotel Management and graduated as hotel assistant manager. In Lenzerheide he also got to know Ladina Jezek from the Engadin, whom he married in 1985. Soon after, he was naturalized as Swiss citizen of Zernez, the hometown of his wife.

After his graduation, the couple moved in the same year to Falera in the Surselva, where José was for two years assistant manager at the hotel "La Siala". In 1986 the daughter Marcia was born and a year later the couple took over the restaurant "Prau la Selva" in Flims. In December 1989, De Queiroz leased in Falera the restaurant "Casa Seeli". In 2005 it was sold and the new owner wanted operate the restaurant himself. Shortly afterwards, José De Queiroz leased the restaurant "Encarna" in Falera, which he manages until today.

== Astronomy ==
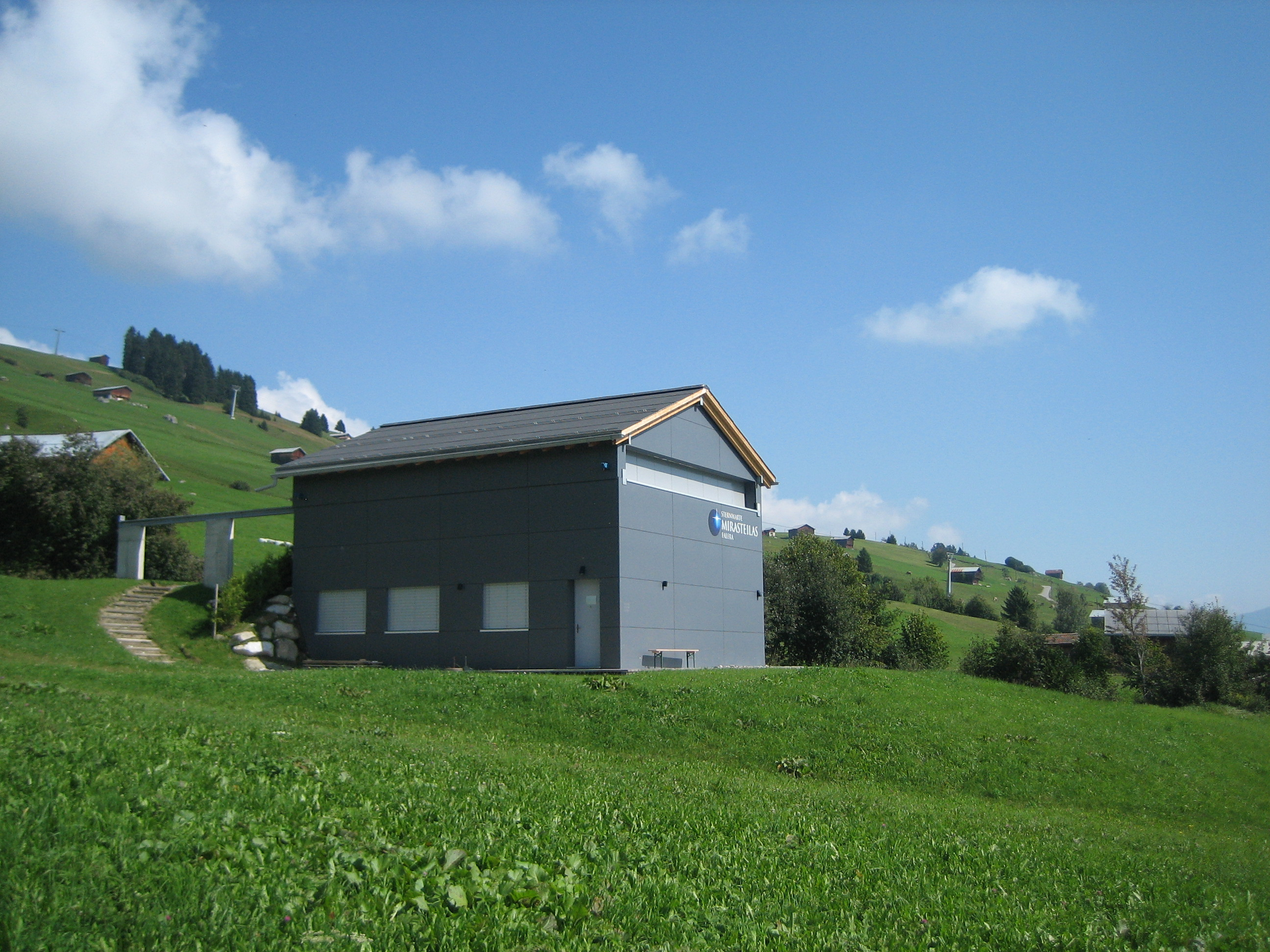
Enclosure of the publicly accessible Mirasteilas Observatory

In Falera, José De Queiroz became interested in astronomy. In the autumn of 1999, he observed the night sky for the first time with a small telescope from his terrace. He started to study all by himself; the telescopes became bigger.

In 2000, De Queiroz became a very active member of the "Astronomical Association of the Grisons". In 2002, at his initiative, the first telescope meeting took place in Falera, followed by yearly repetitions. Well-known speakers such as Bruno Stanek and the astronaut Claude Nicollier transmitted their expertise. The 'Astronomy Days' in Falera are now among the most popular meetings of amateur astronomers from all over Switzerland and neighbouring countries. From 13 to 16 September 2012, the meeting was held for the eleventh time.

The construction of the observatory Sternwarte Mirasteilas above Falera also goes back to the initiative of De Queiroz. It is equipped with a 90-centimeter Cassegrain reflector, the largest reflecting telescope of all private observatories in Switzerland. Inaugurated in summer 2007, Mirasteilas is the largest publicly accessible observatory in Switzerland .

In recognition of his services for Falera, the municipality granted José De Queiroz local citizenship 9 June 2009.

=== Minor planet discoveries ===
De Queiroz discovered the first minor planet on 18 March 2009; the last to date (with the provisional designation GP75) he photographed in the night from 13 to 14 April 2010. Such findings are reported to the Minor Planet Centre of the International Astronomical Union, where the data of all the minor planets, asteroids and comets are collected and reviewed.

José De Queiroz discovered so far 62 asteroids; three of which have received a name: in autumn 2009, he discovered with the large telescope three unknown asteroids that were named Falera, Chur and Marcia (the latter named after his daughter). Another asteroid (72042), discovered by his astronomer friend Stefano Sposetti of the observatory Gnosca in the canton of Ticino, was baptized by the discoverer in the name of Dequeiroz.

Since the autumn of 2012, De Queiroz has been busy with stellar occultation. Together with other amateur astronomers, including Stefano Sposetti from the Ticino and the Austrian Gerhard Dangl, he covers transit data, documenting diameter, shape and orbit of asteroids.
