= Mirasteilas Observatory =

Sternwarte Mirasteilas
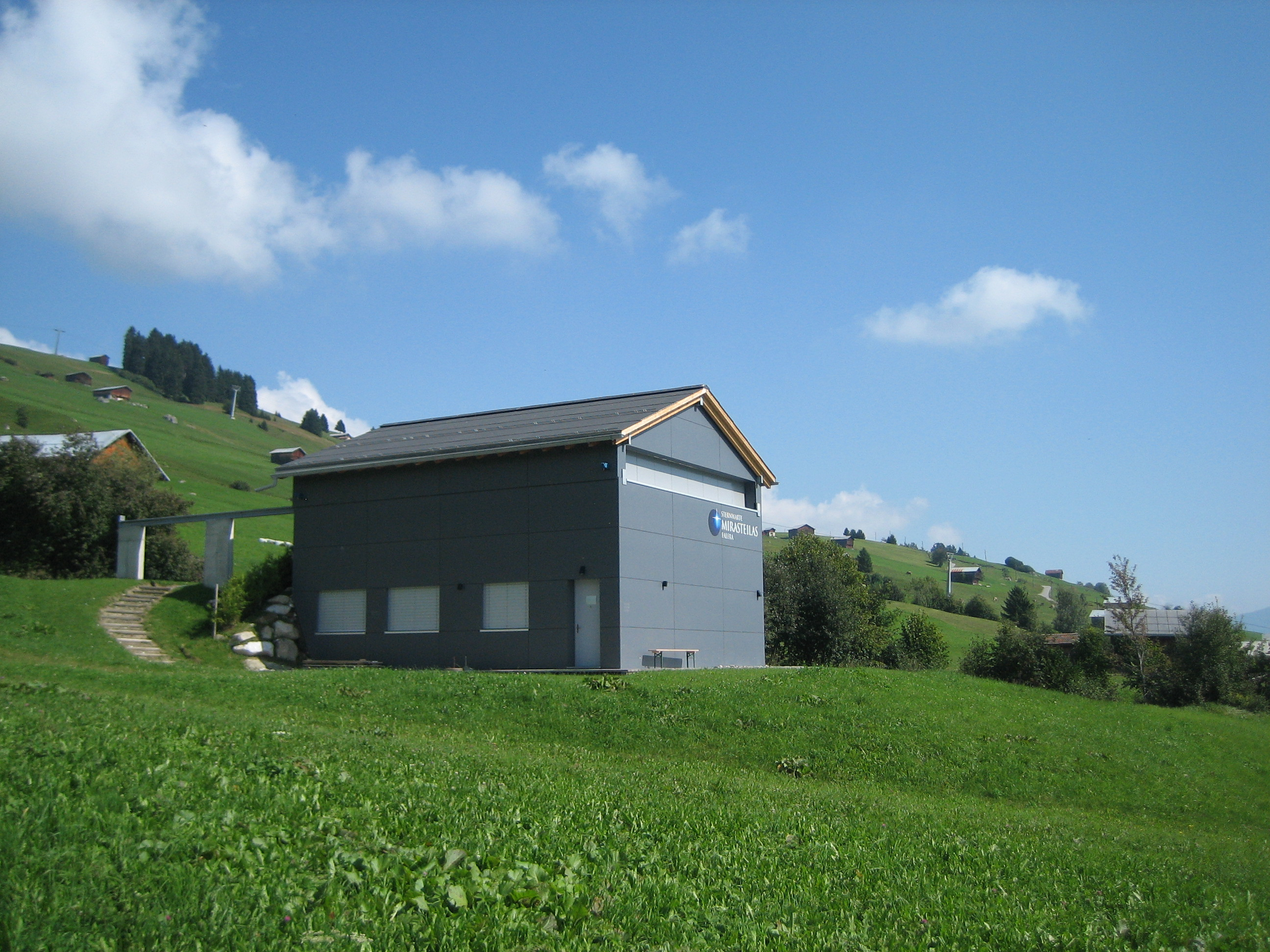
- Organization: Astronomische Gesellschaft Graubünden AGG
- Observatory code: B67
- Location: Falera, Grisons, Switzerland
- Coordinates: 46°48′15.55″N 9°13′27″E
- Altitude: 1,288 m (4,226 ft)
- Established: 2006
- Website: www.sternwarte-mirasteilas.ch
- Related media on Commons

The Mirasteilas Observatory (German: Sternwarte Mirasteilas; Romansh for "stargazer") is an astronomical observatory in Falera in the canton of Grisons in Switzerland. With its 90-centimeter telescope it is the largest publicly accessible observatory in Switzerland.

== History ==
In 2001, the Portuguese-born local community member José De Queiroz, innkeeper in Falera and a member of the Astronomical Society of the Grisons (Graubünden), organized the first astronomy meeting in Falera. Owing to its easy accessibility, its elevated position on a terrace with a broad sky to the west, south, and east and low light pollution, the place offers ideal conditions for observing celestial bodies.

During the next telescope meeting in Falera in 2002 the question was raised whether an observatory could be created here. The municipal council recognized that the construction of an observatory could be a big gain for the village, since no similar investment had been made in the Grisons by that time. Members of the municipal council and the Astronomical Society of the Grisons then visited several observatories in eastern Switzerland to learn about observatories. A suitable location was then found a few minutes outside the village by the ski slope.

On 11 September 2002, a working group was created and the architectural firm of Schneider & Cathomas from Falera took over the planning of the observatory. On 5 December 2005 the town meeting granted a loan of 690,000 Swiss Francs for the construction of the observatory. In addition to the observatory a small restaurant for visitors was to be built for the visitors of the ski slope. A foundation was established with the municipality Falera, the AAG, and Flims-Laax-Falera tourism as members. The groundbreaking ceremony took place on 9 May 2006 and the restaurant was opened in winter 2006/2007. Since the delivery of the large telescope was slightly delayed, the observatory was put into operation only on 22 June 2007.

== Building ==
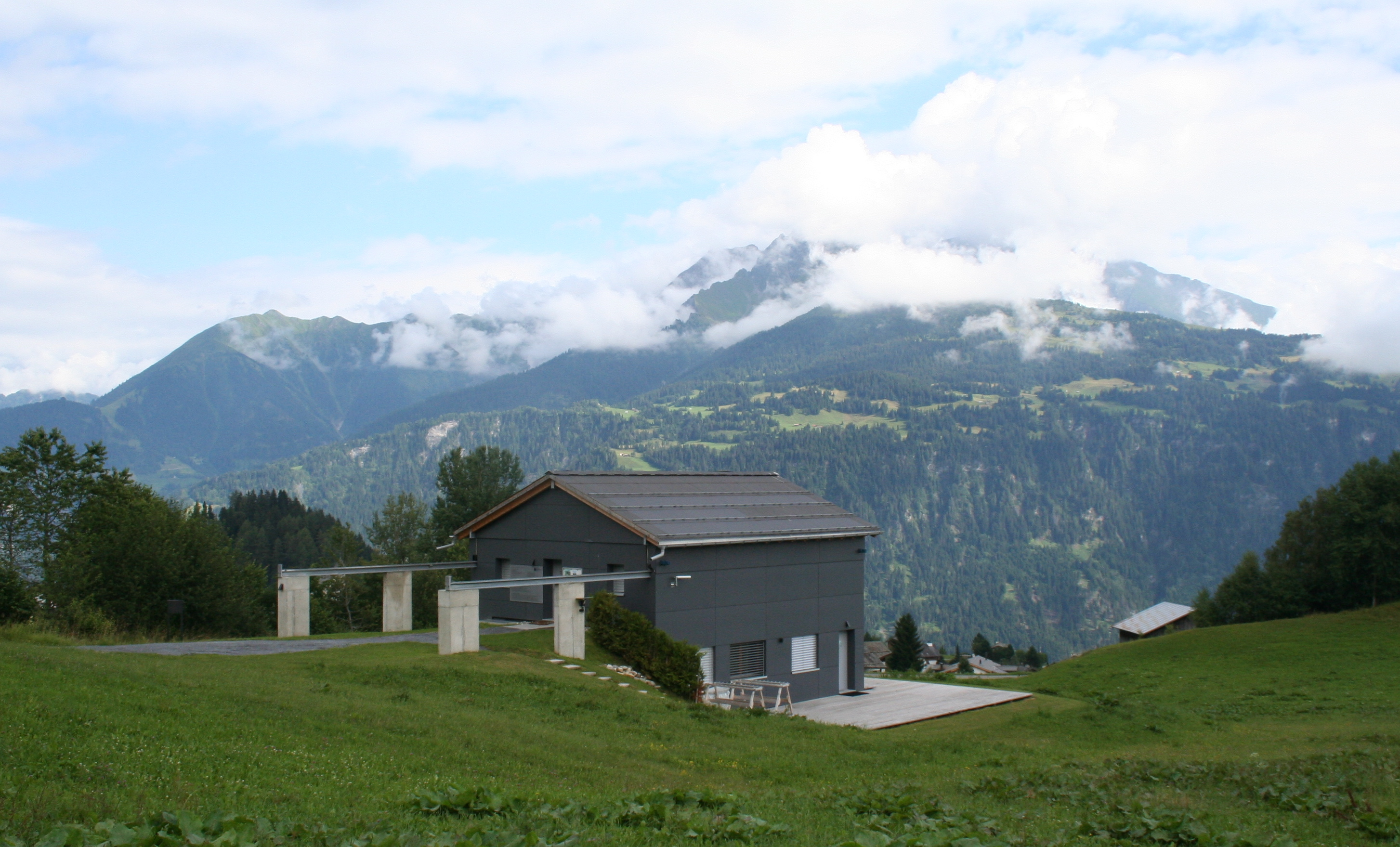
Mirasteilas

The core of the observatory is the observation deck on the first floor with the observation instruments. The roof can be retracted on two tracks so that instruments and the audience get a clear view of the sky. To prevent vibration transmission to the telescope, a separate foundation was created for it. Integrated in the wheelchair-accessible buildings are a technology room, a small restaurant and toilet facilities for the ski slope visitors during the day and for the observatory visitors in the evening. The restaurant space is also used for introduction to the observatory and bad weather programs as an alternative to star gazing.

== Instruments ==
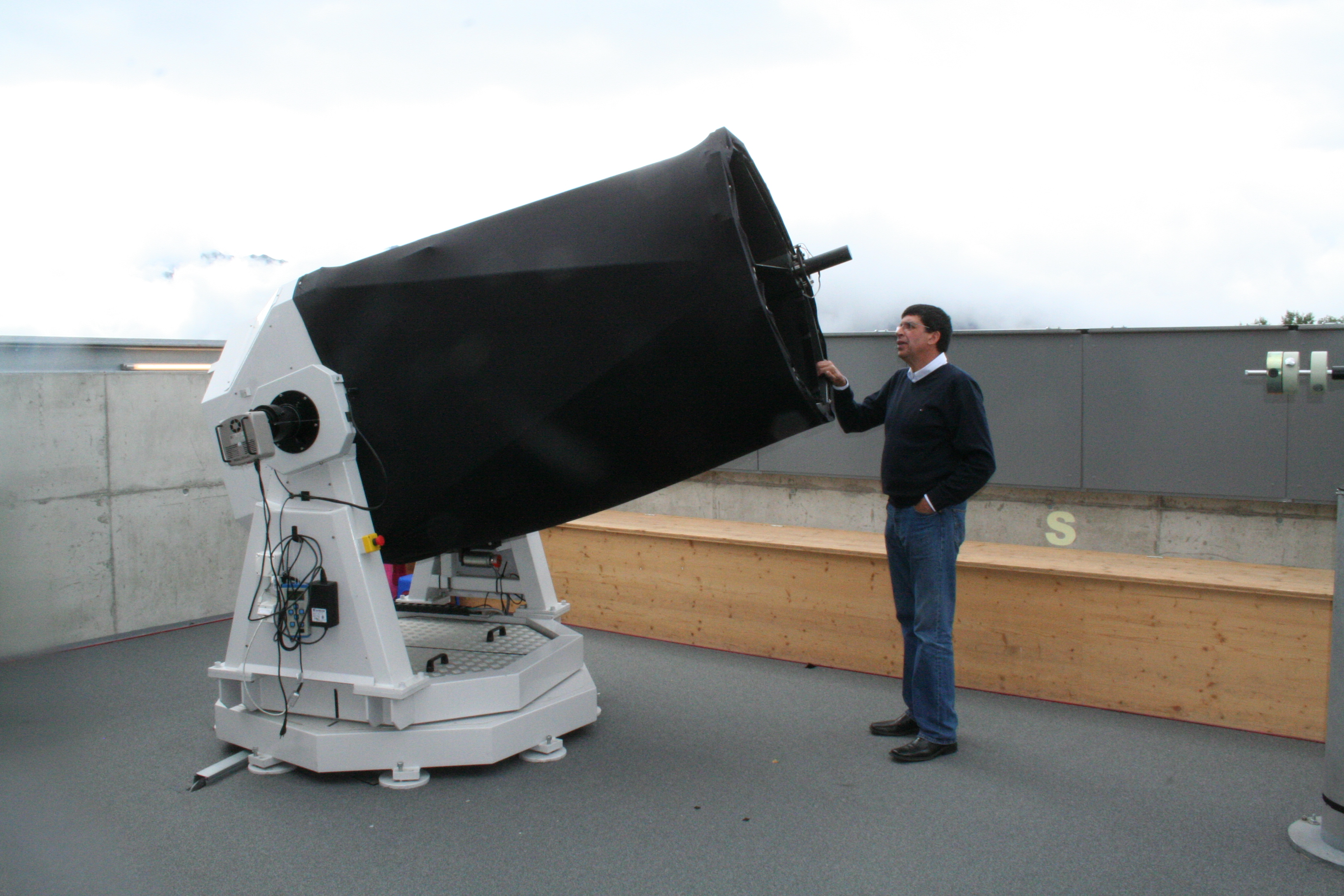
José De Queiroz at the 90 cm-Cassegrain-Telescope

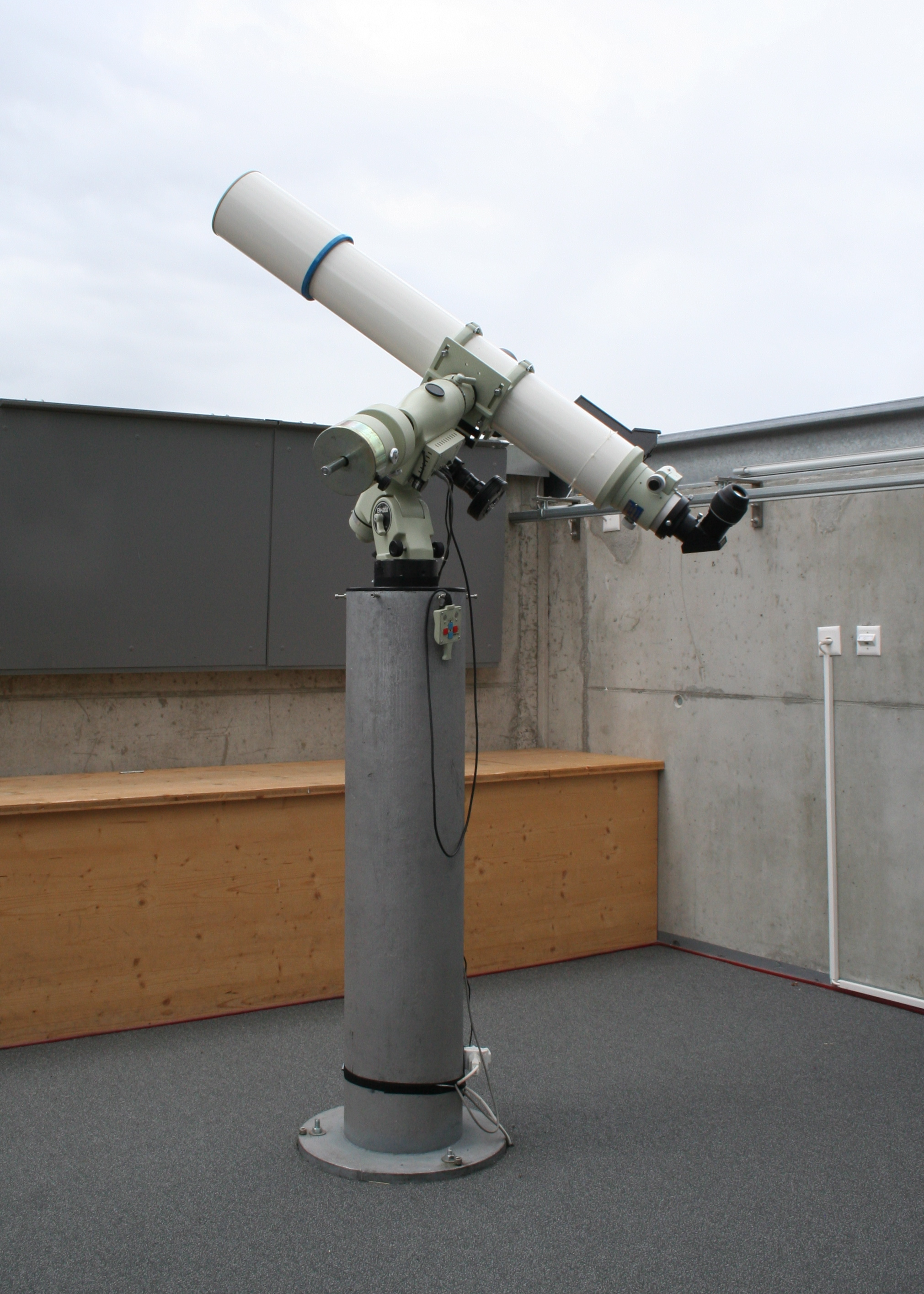
Takahashi-Telescope

The main instrument is a Cassegrain reflector with Nasmyth focus. It has a mirror diameter of 90 cm (35 in) and 2.7 m (9 ft) focal length, and is one of the largest publicly accessible telescopes in Europe. With it up to 1000-fold magnification can be reached. The instrument is fully computer-controlled and can be automatically aligned to any object in the sky. The ocular opening is on the side of the device in the declination axis at 145 cm (57 in) viewing height. Data: 900 mm clear aperture, 9000 mm focal width, with a 5940 mm reducer.

The second instrument is a Takahashi type FS-15, which is a classic refracting telescope. The instrument is particularly suitable for planetary observations. Data: 152 mm clear aperture and 1216 mm focal width.

To view nebulae, galaxies and star clusters in a large field of view, a binocular is available which is purpose-built for astronomical purposes. Specifications: 25x100 millimeters on fork support, optics: 100 mm opening. For astrophotography an astrograph on a separate socket is available.

== Management ==
The observatory is operated by the Astronomical Society of Graubünden AGG. Around 30 trained demonstrators are available to on an alternating schedule. Public tours take place every Friday and Saturday or by appointment.

== Observations ==
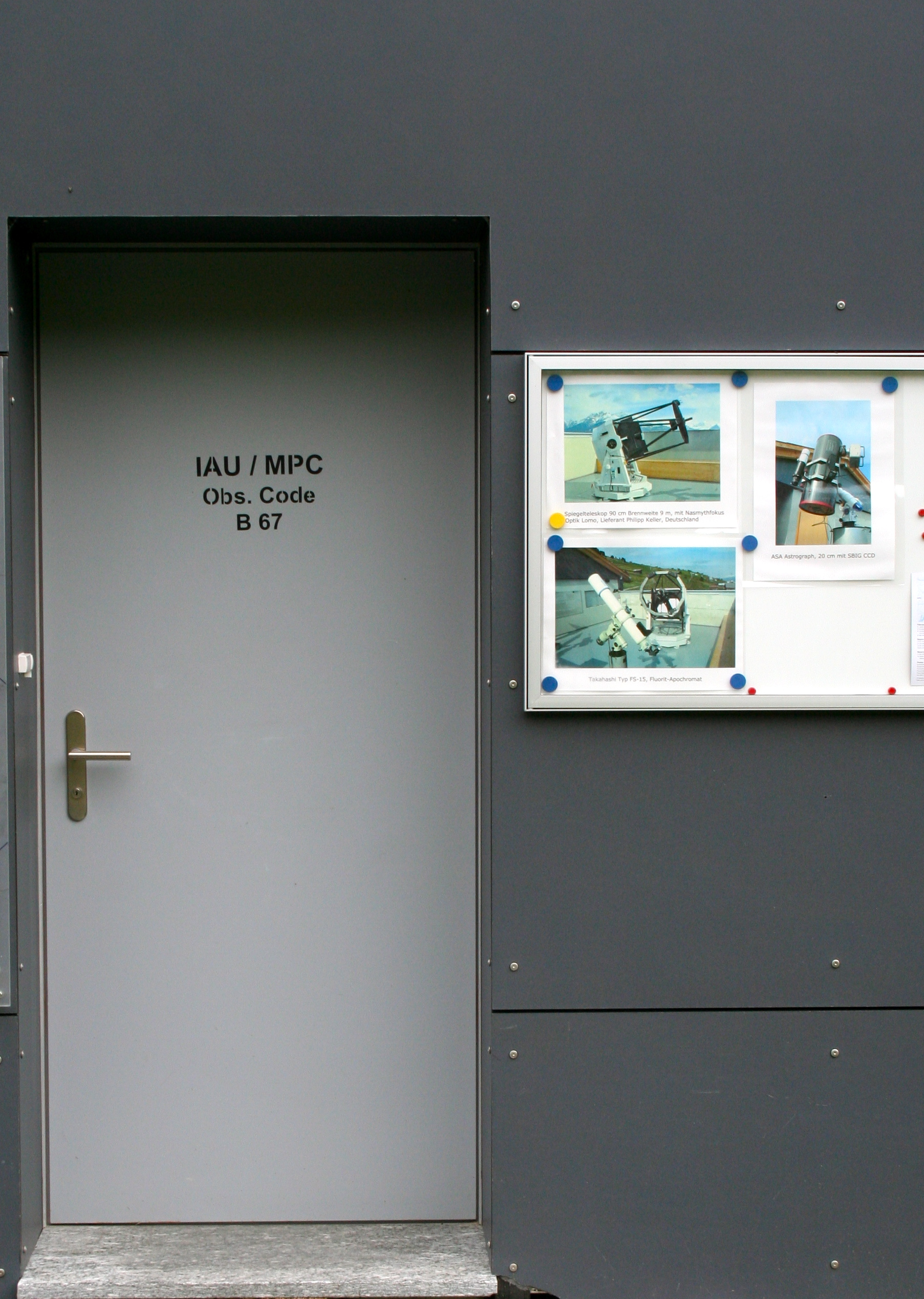
Entry door with IAU code

Thanks to its high quality instruments Mirasteilas can produce scientific work. The observatory of Falera, together with the ones of Winterthur, Carona and Ependes is one of the stations that observe asteroids, comets and satellites and measure their pathways. The data are sent to the Minor Planet Center of the International Astronomical Union at Harvard University and from there to NASA. There, they are available for further scientific research available. The individual measurements allow to detect changes in the pathways of known asteroids or to calculate the orbits of newly discovered objects, discovering thereby possible dangers at an early stage.

== Minor planet "Falera" ==
The asteroid "Falera" was discovered on 21 November 2009 by the founder of the observatory José de Queiroz. The object has a diameter of about 3 kilometers; it orbits the Sun at an average distance of about 471 million kilometers and requires 5 years and 6 months for a complete orbit. At the time of its discovery, the asteroid was about 315 million kilometers from the Earth. It was 16,000 times less bright than stars in the sky that are visible to the naked eye.

On behalf of the International Astronomical Union, the asteroid was named "Falera" and given the minor-planet number (233943). With the naming, the work of the Observatory Mirasteilas is recognized, which deals with the discovery and orbit determination of unknown minor planets since 2008. The official naming citation was published by the Minor Planet Center on 27 May 2010 (M.P.C. 70412).
