= Pico dos Dias Observatory =

Astronomical observatory in Brazil

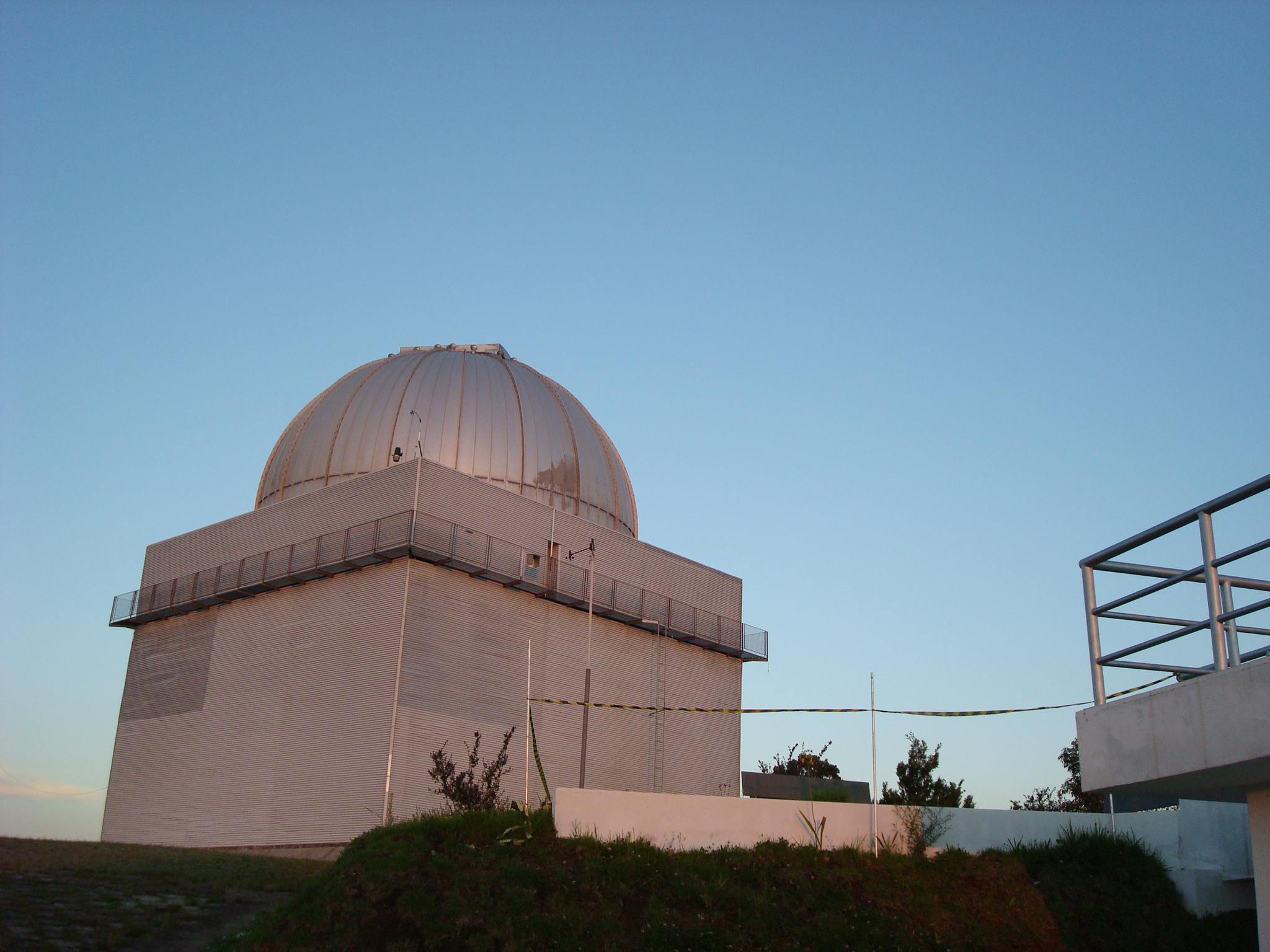
- The 1.6m telescope
- Organization: National Astrophysical Laboratory of Brazil
- Observatory code: 874
- Location: Brasópolis, Minas Gerais, Brazil
- Coordinates: 22°32′04″S 45°34′57″W
- Altitude: 1,864 m (6,115 ft)
- Established: 1980
- Website: www.lna.br/opd/opd_e.html
- Telescopes: 0.6m Boller & Chivens; 0.6m Zeiss Jena; 1.6m Perkin-Elmer
- Location of Pico dos Dias Observatory
- Related media on Commons

The Pico dos Dias Observatory (Portuguese: Observatório Pico dos Dias (OPD)) is an astronomical observatory owned and operated by the National Astrophysical Laboratory of Brazil (Portuguese: Laboratório Nacional de Astrofísica (LNA)). It is located in the Brazilian state of Minas Gerais, 37 kilometers (23 mi) from the city of Itajubá.

== Telescopes ==
- A 1.6 m (63 in) Cassegrain reflector built by Perkin-Elmer first became operational in 1981.
- A 0.6 m (24 in) Ritchey-Chrétien telescope built by Boller & Chivens and installed in 1992 is jointly used by LNA and the University of São Paulo.
- A 0.6 m (24 in) Cassegrain reflector built by Zeiss Jena was purchased in the 1960s through coffee trade with East Germany. It was installed in 1983.

=== ASPOS OKP ===
In April 2017, Russia's space agency, Roscosmos, opened the first Automated Warning System on Hazardous Situations in Outer Space (ASPOS OKP) at Pico dos Dias. There will be another three stations in the system.

== See also ==
- List of astronomical observatories
