= Ultra low expansion glass =

Ultra low expansion glass (ULE) is a registered trademark of Corning Incorporated. ULE has a very low coefficient of thermal expansion and contains as components silica and less than 10% titanium dioxide. Such high resistance to thermal expansion makes it very resistant to high temperature thermal shock. ULE has been made by Corning since the 1960s, but is still very important to current applications.

== Applications ==
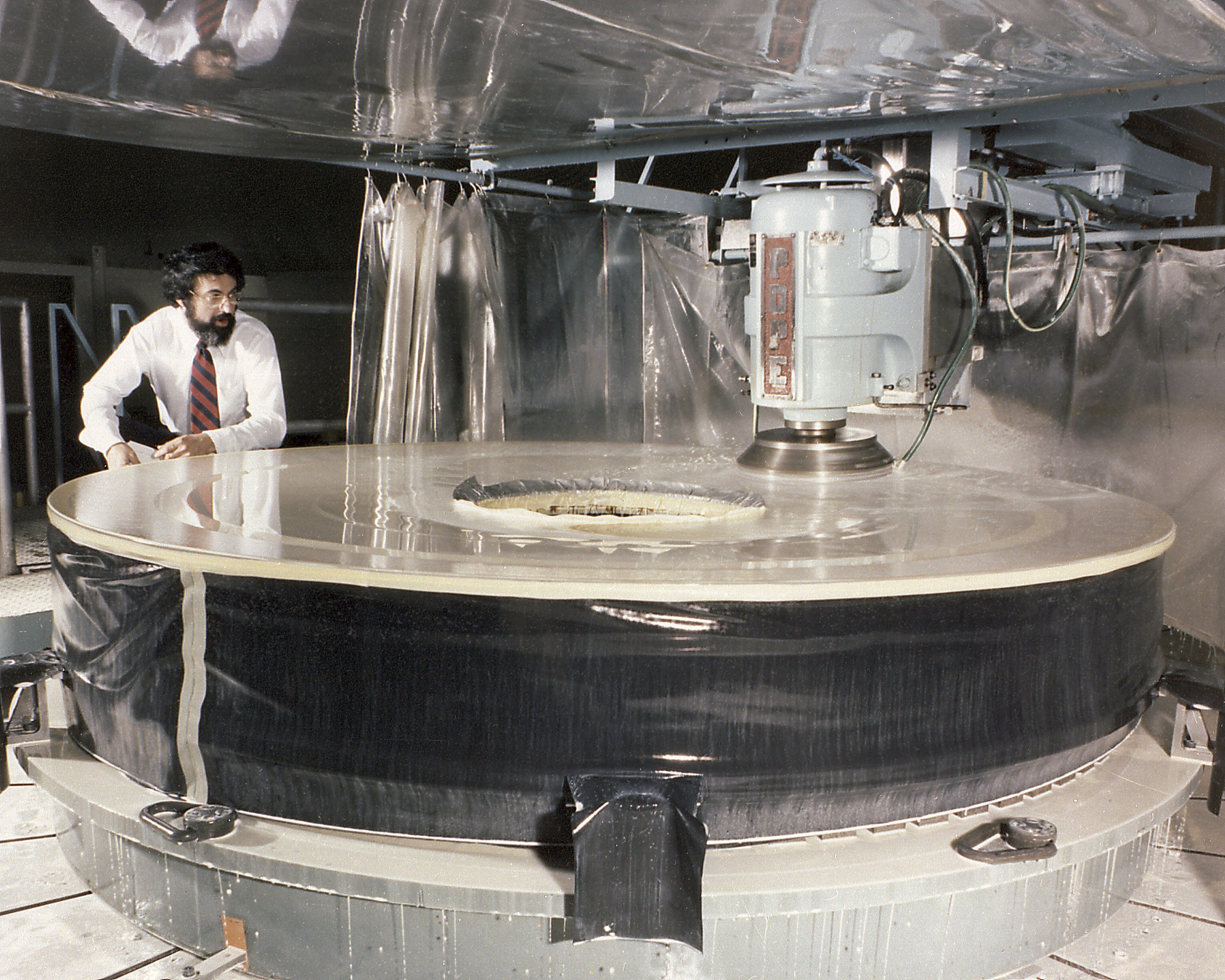
Hubble Space Telescope mirror made out of ULE glass.

There are many applications for ULE, but by far the most common is for mirrors and lenses for telescopes in both space and terrestrial settings. One of the most well known examples of the use of ULE is in the Hubble Space Telescope's mirror. Another good example of its application is in the Gemini telescope's mirror bank. This type of material is needed for this application because the mirrors on telescopes, especially very large, high-precision units, cannot bend or lose their shape even slightly. If this were to happen, the telescope would be out of focus. Some other examples and uses of ULE are:

- Ultra-low expansion substrates for mirrors and other optics
- Length standards
- Lightweight honeycomb mirror mounts
- Astronomical telescopes
- Precision measurement technology
- Laser cavities

Another newer use for this material that is showing promise is in the semiconductor industry, this again because of the purity and extreme low expansion of ULE glass.

== Structure ==
The structure of ULE is completely amorphous; because of this it is a glass, not a ceramic. The amorphous structure of the material comes from there being no crystal phases within the structure, so there is no long range order.

== Processing ==
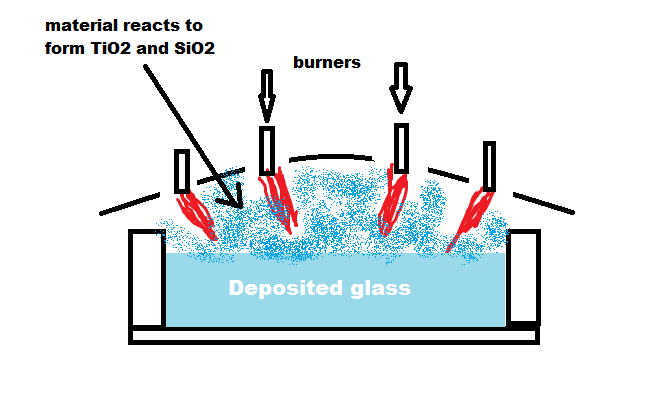
Diagram of process of making ULE glass.

The way that ULE is made is very different from the standard way that glass is made. Instead of mixing powdered materials together into a batch, melting that batch and pouring out sheets of glass, ULE, being such a high temperature glass, has to be made in a flame hydrolysis process. In this process high purity precursors are injected into the flames, which causes them to react and form TiO_{2} and SiO_{2}. The TiO_{2} and SiO_{2} then fall down and are deposited onto the growing glass.

== Properties ==
=== Thermal ===
Ultra low expansion glass has an coefficient of thermal expansion of about 10^{−8}/K at 5–35 °C. It has a thermal conductivity of 1.31 W/(m·°C), thermal diffusion of 0.0079 cm^{2}/s, a mean specific heat of 767 J/(kg·°C), a strain point of 890 °C [1634 °F], and an estimated softening point of 1490 °C [2714 °F], an annealing point of 1000 °C [1832 °F].

=== Mechanical ===
Ultra low expansion glass has an ultimate tensile strength of 49.8 MPa (7,220 psi), a Poisson’s ratio 0.17, a density of 2.21 g/cm^{3} (0.079 lb/in^{3}), a specific stiffness of 3.12×10^{6} m (1.23×10^{8} in), a shear modulus of 29.0 GPa (4.20×10^{6} psi), a bulk modulus of 34.1 GPa (4.95×10^{6} psi), and an elastic modulus of 67.6 GPa (9.80×10^{6} psi).

=== Optical ===
ULE has a Stress Optical Coefficient of 4.15 (nm/cm)/(kg/cm^{3}) [0.292(nm/cm) psi], and an Abbe number of 53.1.

=== Other ===
ULE has a high resistance to weathering because of its hardness, and is also unaffected by nearly all chemical agents. ULE also shows no changes when quickly cooled from 350 °C.
