= Caspar Schmid von Grüneck =

Grisons politician (fl. 1580–1659)

- Other name: Kaspar Schmid von Grüneck
- Occupations: Politician; envoy; military commander
- Parents: Wilhelm Schmid von Grüneck (father); Mierta von Mont (mother)
- Relatives: Jacob Schmid von Grüneck (brother)

Caspar Schmid von Grüneck (recorded 1580–1659) was a politician, envoy and military commander of the Grey League from Ilanz, a member of the Schmid von Grüneck family. He was twice Landrichter of the Grey League and an envoy of the Three Leagues to Innsbruck and to the Reformed cantons of the Swiss Confederacy, and in 1634 he commanded the troops of the Grey League in the campaigns of Henri de Rohan.

== Biography ==
Caspar Schmid von Grüneck is first recorded in 1580 and last in 1659. He was the son of Wilhelm Schmid von Grüneck and Mierta von Mont, and the brother of Jacob. He owned the Casa Carniec in Ilanz, now the Museum Regiunal Surselva.

In 1613 Schmid von Grüneck was Landammann of the Gruob. In 1615 he was commissari (commissioner) of Chiavenna, in 1619 and 1634 Landrichter (president) of the Grey League, and in 1639 podestà of Tirano.

In 1629 Schmid von Grüneck was an envoy of the Three Leagues to Innsbruck, where he strongly advocated religious freedom for the people of the Prättigau, and in 1631 to the Reformed cantons of the Swiss Confederacy. In 1634 he was supreme captain (Oberster Hauptmann) of the troops of the Grey League in the campaigns of Duke Henri de Rohan. He was a skillful negotiator with a talent for mediation.

== Bibliography ==
- A. Maissen, Die Landrichter des Grauen Bundes, 1424–1799, 1990, 67
