= Donat Cadruvi =

Swiss lawyer, politician and writer

Donat Cadruvi (19 September 1923, Schluein – 1 March 1998) was a Swiss lawyer, politician and Romansh-language writer. He was a member of the Swiss National Council (1963–1971), mayor of Ilanz (1975–1978), member of the government of Graubünden (1979–1988).
