= Schmid von Grüneck family =

Political family of Ilanz, Grisons

- Country: Switzerland
- Etymology: Predicate von Grüneck (1544), after Grüneck Castle
- Place of origin: Ilanz, Grisons
- Founded: 1397 (first record)
- Members: Jacob Schmid von Grüneck; Caspar Schmid von Grüneck; Christoffel Schmid von Grüneck; Georg Schmid von Grüneck
- Dissolution: 1738 (Ilanz line)

The Schmid von Grüneck family was a leading family of politicians of Ilanz, in the Grisons. Recorded in Ilanz from 1397, the Schmid were burghers of the town and worked there as smiths. In 1544 they received the predicate von Grüneck, after the nearby castle, from Emperor Charles V. The family produced many statesmen, scholars and officers. It died out in Ilanz in 1738, while other lines of the family lived elsewhere in the Grisons.

== History ==
The first Schmid on record is a Haennes, burger ze Ilanz (burgher of Ilanz), in 1397. The burgher family Schmid worked as smiths in their place of origin. In 1544 master Jacob Schmid, who had been a captain in imperial service, obtained from Charles V the predicate von Grüneck, after the castle near Ilanz. His son Hans Jakob Schmid von Grüneck obtained from Archduke Ferdinand of Austria in 1583 an additional confirmation of nobility and of the coat of arms for himself and his three brothers; he also built the manor house at the Obertor (upper gate) of Ilanz.

Hans Jakob's descendants included many statesmen, scholars and soldiers, such as the politician Jacob Schmid von Grüneck, the jurist and diplomat Caspar Schmid von Grüneck and the senior officer Christoffel Schmid von Grüneck. Other members held local and state offices, as well as administrative offices in the Valtellina. Wilhelm Schmid von Grüneck, a son of the Jacob mentioned above, wrote the work Problemata philosophica miscellanea and was a professor at the Academy of Geneva around 1629.

Around 1700 the family owned in Ilanz the Casa Carniec (now the Museum regiunal Surselva) and the Casa Gronda, an imposing Baroque building with a tower that Johann Anton Schmid von Grüneck (1643–1680) had built in 1677. The family had income from military service and pensions, and from extensive landholdings, which in the 16th century reached as far as the region of the Splügen Pass. Members of the family often acted as advocates of the Reformed population in the Surselva. The rebuilding of the town walls and town gates of Ilanz, which the Schmid von Grüneck actively promoted in 1717 and which was also supported by Zurich and Bern, symbolized protection for the Reformed minority, who felt threatened.

The family died out in Ilanz in 1738; other lines of the family lived in Degen, Mon, Ftan, Malans and Chur. Georg Schmid von Grüneck, bishop of Chur, came from the Catholic branch of the family at Sumvitg.

== Bibliography ==
- Augustin Maissen, Die Landrichter des Grauen Bundes, 1424–1799. Siegel, Wappen, Biographien, 1990, pp. 66–70

=== Archives ===
- Staatsarchiv Graubünden (State Archives of the Grisons), Chur
