= Jacob Schmid von Grüneck =

Grisons statesman (1579–1644)

- Born: 1579
- Died: 1644 (aged 64–65)
- Other name: Jakob Schmid von Grüneck
- Occupations: Statesman; envoy
- Spouse: Narcissa von Salis
- Children: Wilhelm Schmid von Grüneck
- Parents: Wilhelm Schmid von Grüneck (father); Mierta von Mont (mother)
- Relatives: Caspar Schmid von Grüneck (brother)

Jacob Schmid von Grüneck (1579–1644) was a statesman and envoy of the Three Leagues during the Bündner Wirren, a member of the Schmid von Grüneck family. A doctor of both laws, he represented the interests of the Grisons on embassies to Genoa, Milan, Paris and Madrid, and he played a major part in shaping the First Capitulation of Milan of 1639.

== Biography ==
Jacob Schmid von Grüneck was born in 1579, the son of Wilhelm Schmid von Grüneck and Mierta von Mont, and the brother of Caspar. He married Narcissa von Salis. His son Wilhelm wrote the work Problemata philosophica miscellanea and was a professor at the Academy of Geneva around 1629.

Schmid von Grüneck was a doctor of both laws, and in 1593 he received his diploma as a notary in Bormio. He was a friend of the Vertemate family in Plurs (Piuro).

In 1625, during the reconquest of the Valtellina by France, Schmid von Grüneck was a colonel in the regiment of Rudolf von Schauenstein. On embassies to Genoa in 1628, Milan in 1632, Paris in 1633 and Madrid in 1638–1639, he skillfully represented the interests of the Grisons. He played a major part in shaping the First Capitulation of Milan (Erstes Mailänder Kapitulat) of 1639, a compromise treaty. He was an outstanding statesman and envoy during the Bündner Wirren. He died in 1644.

== Bibliography ==
- A. Pfister, Jörg Jenatsch, 4th edition, 1984, 189, 245, 309, 360, 420
