= Sevgein =

- Former municipality
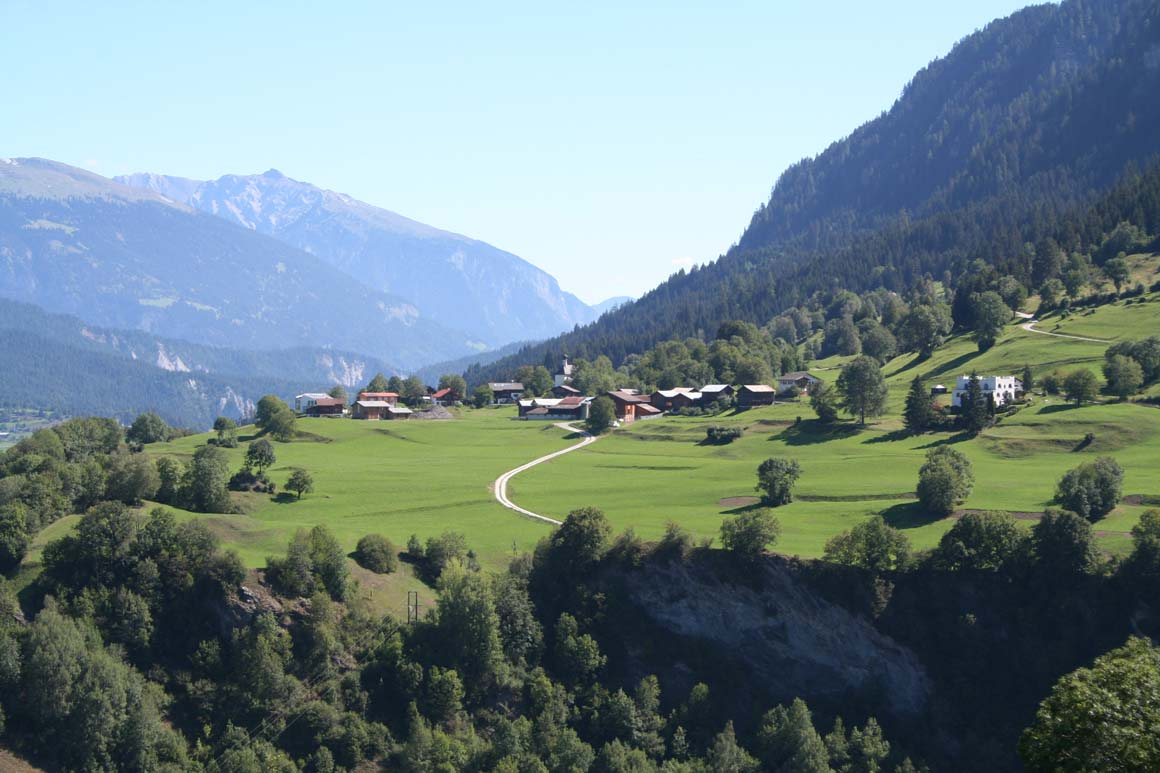

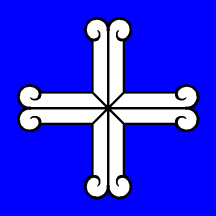
- Flag Coat of arms
- Location of Sevgein
- Location within Switzerland Location within Canton of Graubünden
- Coordinates: 46°45′N 9°13′E
- Country: Switzerland
- Canton: Graubünden
- District: Surselva

Area
  - Total: 4.60 km^{2} (1.78 sq mi)
- Elevation: 861 m (2,825 ft)

Population (Dec 2011)
  - Total: 198
  - Density: 43.0/km^{2} (111/sq mi)
- Time zone: UTC+01:00 (CET)
  - Summer (DST): UTC+02:00 (CEST)
- Postal code: 7127
- SFOS number: 3584
- ISO 3166 code: CH-GR
- Surrounded by: Castrisch, Cumbel, Ilanz, Luven, Pitasch, Riein
- Website: SFSO statistics

Sevgein (Romansh pronunciation: [sɛvˈdʑɛjn]; German: Seewis im Oberland) is a former municipality in the district of Surselva in the Swiss canton of Graubünden. On 1 January 2014 the former municipalities of Sevgein, Castrisch, Ilanz, Ladir, Luven, Pitasch, Riein, Ruschein, Schnaus, Duvin, Pigniu, Rueun and Siat merged into the new municipality of Ilanz/Glion.

== History ==
Sevgein is first mentioned about 840 as Soviene.

== Geography ==
Before the merger, Sevgein had a total area of 4.6 km^{2} (1.8 mi^{2}). Of this area, 39.6% is used for agricultural purposes, while 51.5% is forested. Of the rest of the land, 5.2% is settled (buildings or roads), and the remainder (3.7%) is non-productive (rivers, glaciers or mountains).

The former municipality is located in the Ilanz sub-district of the Surselva district. It is located on a terrace in the southern Vorderrhein valley. It consists of the village of Sevgein and the settlement of Isla near Ilanz. Until 1943 Sevgein was known by its German name as Seewis im Oberland.

== Demographics ==
Sevgein had a population (as of 2011) of 198. As of 2008, 1.4% of the population was made up of foreign nationals. Over the last 10 years the population has grown at a rate of 8.5%. Most of the population (as of 2000) speaks Romansh (54.6%), with German being the second most common (44.9%) and Portuguese being third ( 0.5%).

As of 2000, the gender distribution of the population was 52.8% male and 47.2% female. The age distribution, as of 2000, in Sevgein is; 23 children or 11.1% of the population are between 0 and 9 years old and 37 teenagers or 17.9% are between 10 and 19. Of the adult population, 33 people or 15.9% of the population are between 20 and 29 years old. 19 people or 9.2% are between 30 and 39, 23 people or 11.1% are between 40 and 49, and 30 people or 14.5% are between 50 and 59. The senior population distribution is 16 people or 7.7% of the population are between 60 and 69 years old, 18 people or 8.7% are between 70 and 79, there are 5 people or 2.4% who are between 80 and 89, and there are 3 people or 1.4% who are between 90 and 99.

In the 2007 federal election the most popular party was the CVP which received 36.9% of the vote. The next three most popular parties were the SVP (29.3%), the SP (20.8%) and the FDP (13%).

In Sevgein about 72.1% of the population (between age 25-64) have completed either non-mandatory upper secondary education or additional higher education (either university or a Fachhochschule).

Sevgein has an unemployment rate of 0.31%. As of 2005, there were 26 people employed in the primary economic sector and about 9 businesses involved in this sector. 6 people are employed in the secondary sector and there are 3 businesses in this sector. 10 people are employed in the tertiary sector, with 3 businesses in this sector.

The historical population is given in the following table:

year	population
1850	173
1900	179
1950	210
1970	151
1990	194
2000	207
