= Christoffel Schmid von Grüneck =

Officer in Dutch service (1671–1730)

- Born: 14 February 1671
- Died: 1730
- Spouse: Dorothea Caecilia Schmid von Grüneck (m. 1708)
- Military career
- Allegiance: Dutch Republic
- Branch: Dutch States Army
- Service years: from 1693
- Rank: Major general
- Conflicts: Battle of Malplaquet (wounded)

Christoffel Schmid von Grüneck (14 February 1671 – 1730) was an officer in Dutch service and a politician from the Grisons, a member of the Schmid von Grüneck family. From 1706 he was colonel and proprietor of a regiment in the Dutch States Army. He was wounded at the Battle of Malplaquet in 1709 and became a major general in 1726. In 1716 he published a map of the Three Leagues.

== Biography ==
Christoffel Schmid von Grüneck was born on 14 February 1671, the son of Hans Jakob Schmid von Grüneck and Anna Schorsch. In 1708 he married Dorothea Caecilia Schmid von Grüneck.

Schmid von Grüneck was first educated by private tutors and pastors, then at the higher school (höhere Schule) in Zurich. He traveled to the Netherlands and to Paris. As early as 1686 he was Landammann of the Gruob in place of his late father. In 1689 he was chancellor (Kanzler) in Sondrio, and in 1691 podestà of Morbegno.

In 1693 Schmid von Grüneck entered Dutch military service as a lieutenant in the regiment of Hercules Capol. After Capol's death in 1706 he became colonel and proprietor (Regimentsinhaber) of the regiment, in 1719 a brigadier and in 1726 a major general. He was wounded at the Battle of Malplaquet in 1709.

In 1716 Schmid von Grüneck published a map of the Three Leagues, in Amsterdam. He owned land in the Val San Giacomo (Valle Spluga), and in 1715 he was a partner in the silk factory in Chiavenna. He died in 1730.

== Works ==
- Journal de ma vie, 1711 (Staatsarchiv Graubünden)

== Bibliography ==
- M. Bundi, Bündner Kriegsdienste in Holland um 1700, 1972, 90–126
