= Grüneck Castle =

Swiss Castle

- Ilanz/Glion
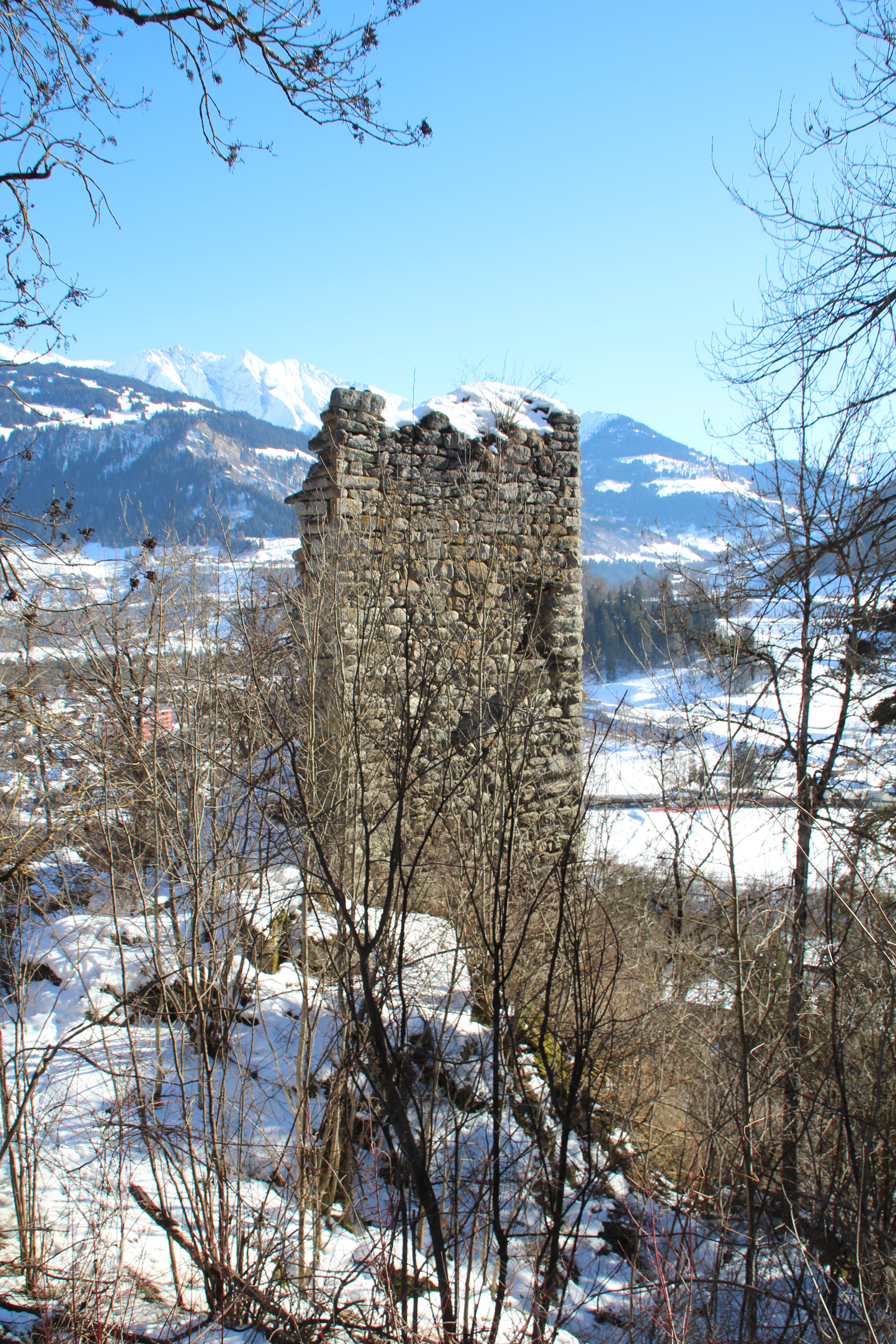
- View of the castle, looking north

Site information
- Type: hill castle
- Code: CH-GR
- Condition: ruin

Location
- Location within Canton of Graubünden Location within Switzerland
- Coordinates: 46°46′33.6″N 9°11′41.6″E
- Height: 720 m above the sea

Site history
- Built: around 1200
- Materials: bossage stone

Grüneck Castle is a ruined castle in the municipality of Ilanz of the Canton of Graubünden in Switzerland.

== History ==
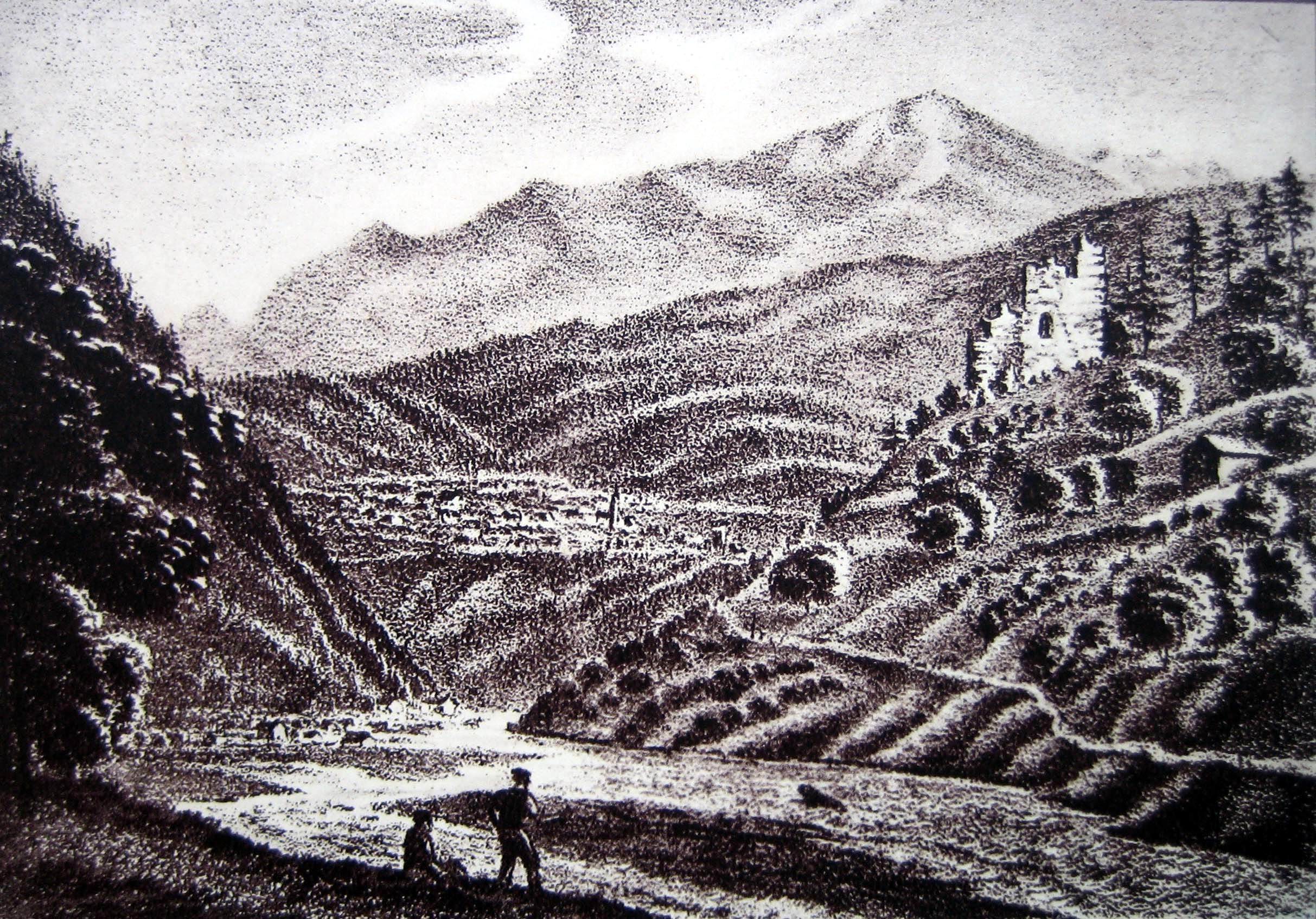
Drawing of the castle in 1830

Grüneck Castle was probably built around 1200 by an unknown builder. The de Grienenech family first appears in the historical record in 1260, but it is unclear whether they had any ties to the castle. The first time the castle is clearly named in a record is in 1515, when it was owned by St. Nicolai monastery in Chur and may have already been a ruin. The noble family Schmid von Grüneck, who were one of the most powerful families in Ilanz from the 15th to 18th century, never owned or lived at Grüneck Castle. They were raised to the nobility by Emperor Charles V in 1544, but may have chosen to name themselves after the ruins.

In 1811 and again in 1904 several large Carolingian coin hoards were discovered during construction of the Ruschein road near the castle. The coins were probably buried around 790 and included coins from the rule of Charlemagne and the Lombard King Desiderius. About 137 coins from the discoveries are cataloged and held at the Rätisches Museum in Chur. One of the containers that held the coins, which is made from antler and T-shaped, is now kept in the British Museum.

== Castle site ==
The castle is located west of Ilanz on a hill along the Ruschein road. The tower is an uneven pentagon shape with only the west and south-west wall still standing. The walls are up to 3 meters (9.8 ft) thick. The corners are built of massive bossage stones which were precisely cut to the non-right angle sides required by the five sided construction. The tower was at least four stories high and may have had an additional upper wooden level. On the second floor there are remains of a garderobe and a doorway that once led out to a wooden balcony.

== Gallery ==
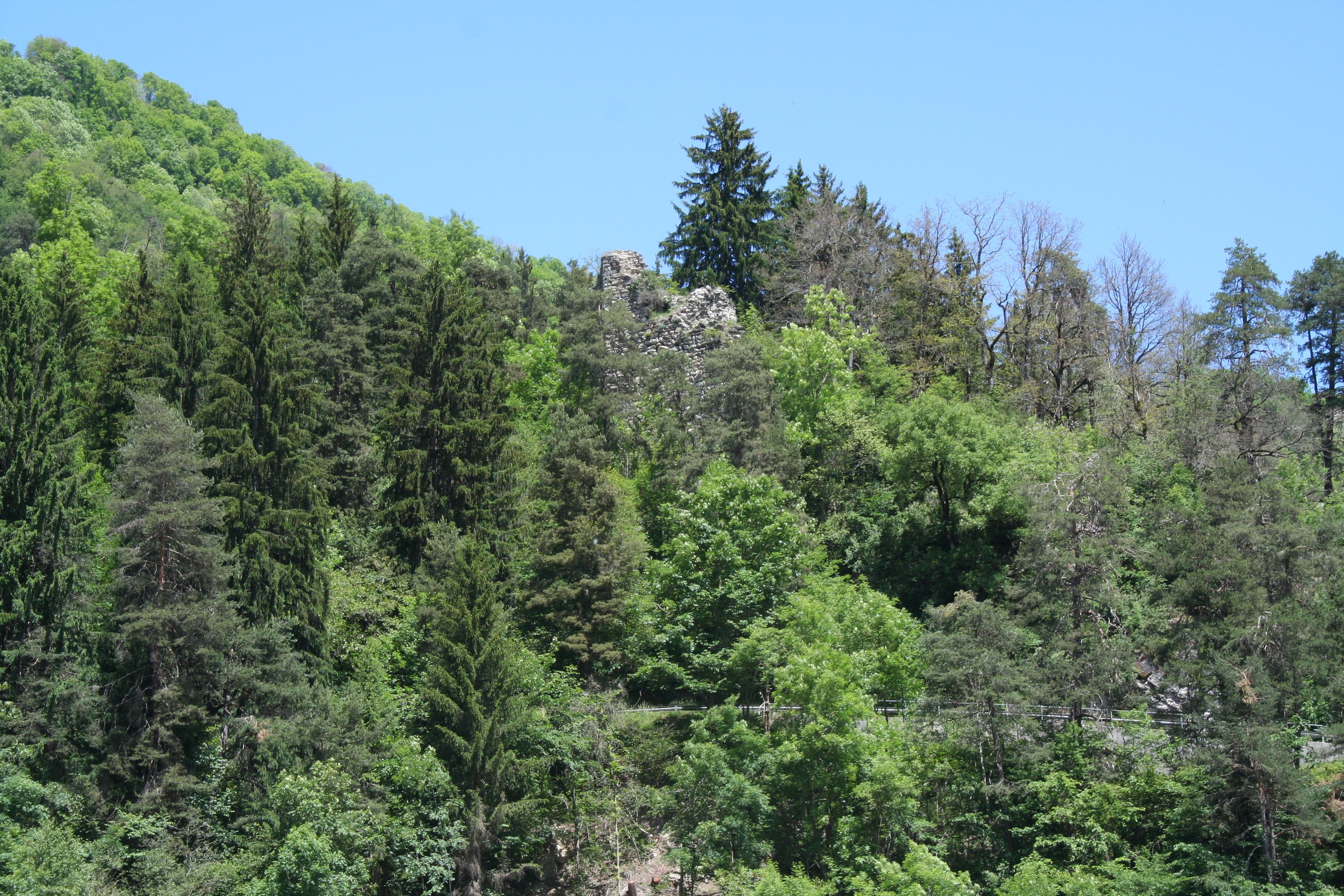
Location of the castle

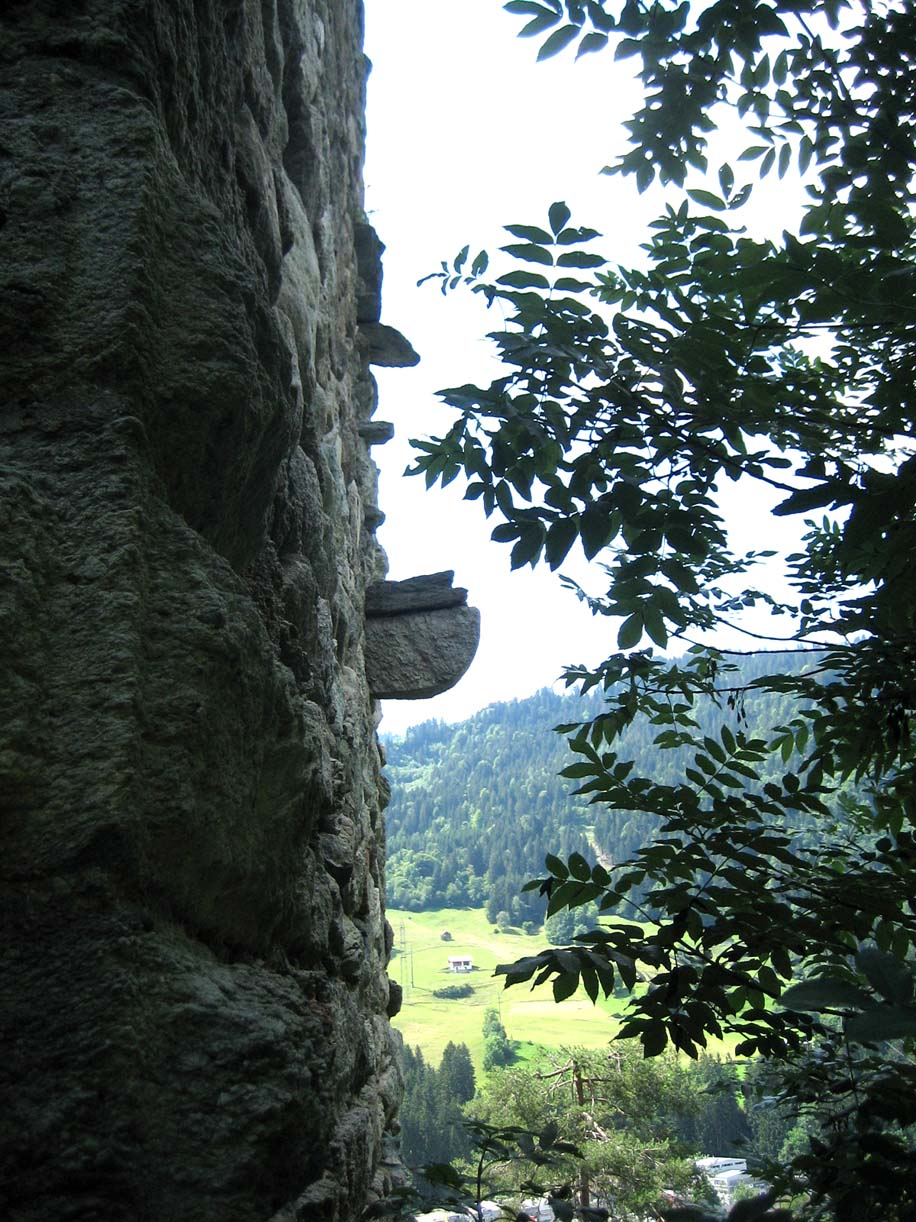
Remains of a garderobe projecting from the walls

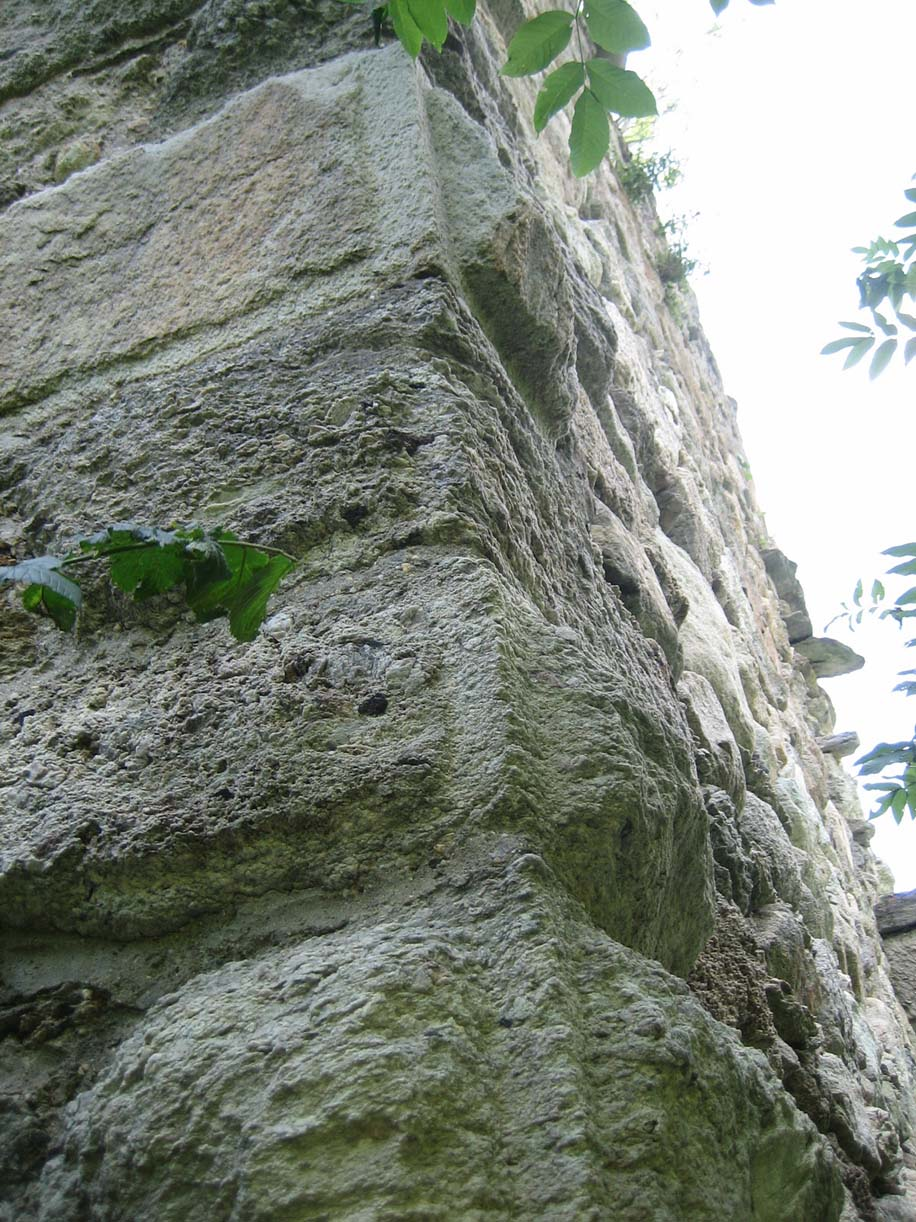
Large, rounded bossage stones on the corner

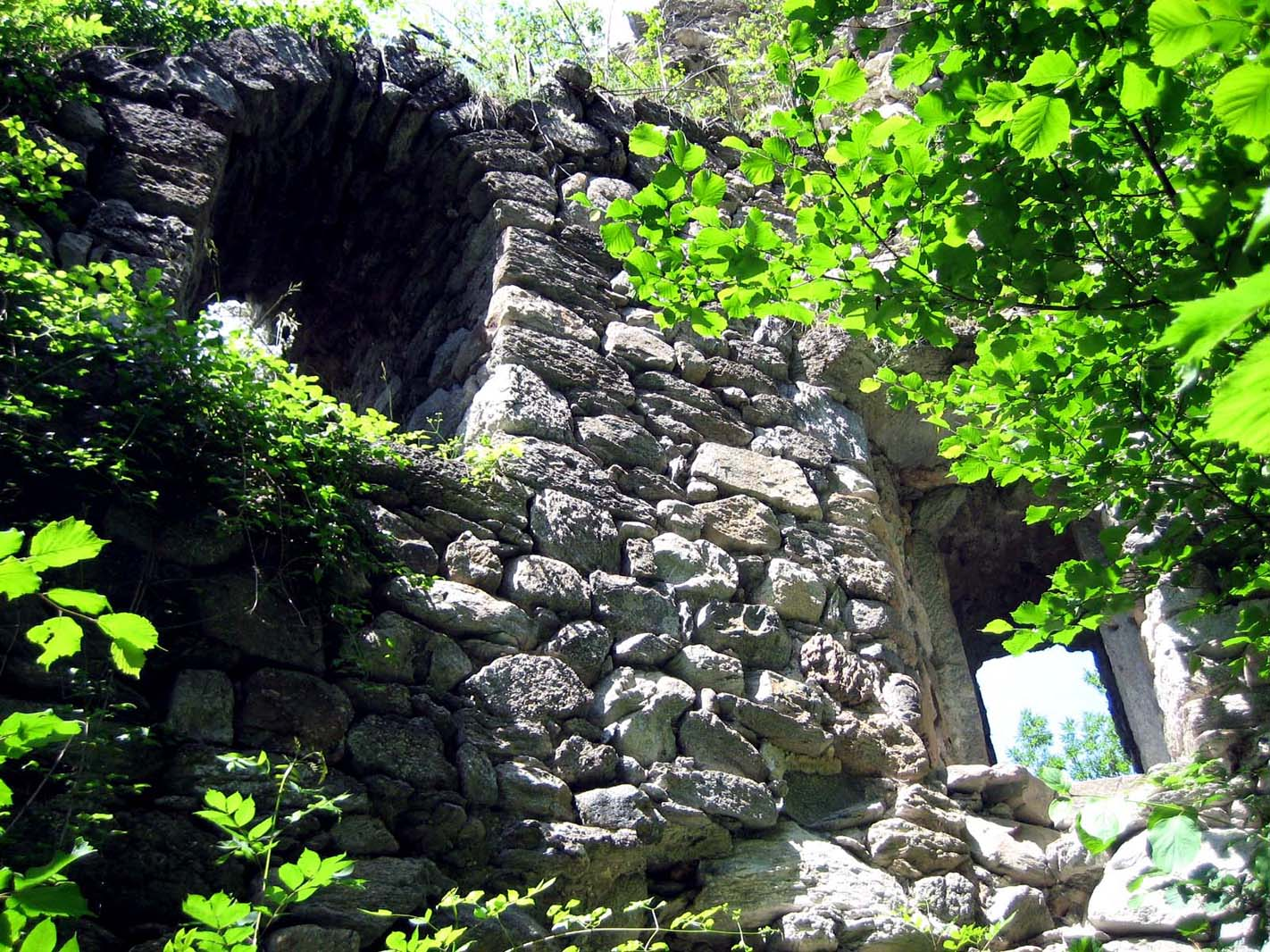
A window and the garderobe entrance

== See also ==
- List of castles in Switzerland
