= Schluein =

- Municipality
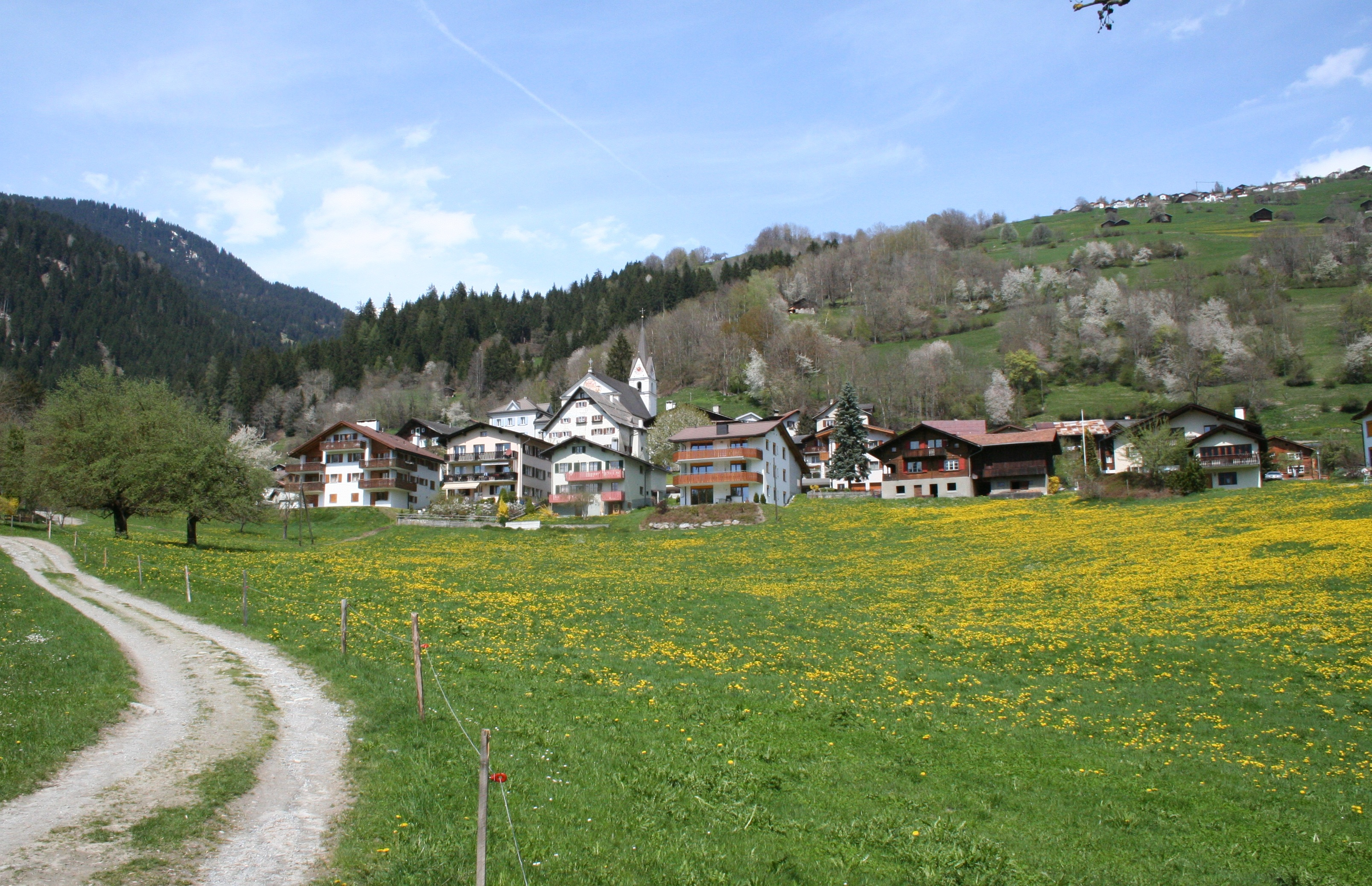

- Flag Coat of arms
- Location of Schluein
- Location within Switzerland Location within Canton of Grisons
- Coordinates: 46°47′N 9°14′E
- Country: Switzerland
- Canton: Grisons
- District: Surselva

Area
  - Total: 4.81 km^{2} (1.86 sq mi)
- Elevation: 762 m (2,500 ft)

Population (December 2020)
  - Total: 611
  - Density: 127/km^{2} (329/sq mi)
- Time zone: UTC+01:00 (CET)
  - Summer (DST): UTC+02:00 (CEST)
- Postal code: 7151
- SFOS number: 3582
- ISO 3166 code: CH-GR
- Surrounded by: Castrisch, Falera, Ilanz, Ladir, Ruschein, Sagogn
- Website: https://www.schluein.ch/ SFSO statistics

Schluein (Romansh pronunciation: [ʃlwɛjn]; Romansh: Schleuis) is a municipality in the Surselva Region in the Swiss canton of the Grisons.

== History ==
Schluein is first mentioned in 831 as Falerunae. In 1298 it was mentioned as Sluwen. Throughout the Middle Ages until the Act of Mediation, which ended the French controlled Helvetic Republic in 1803, Schluein was under the authority of the Herrschaft of the Löwenberg. The village church is first mentioned in 1321.

== Geography ==
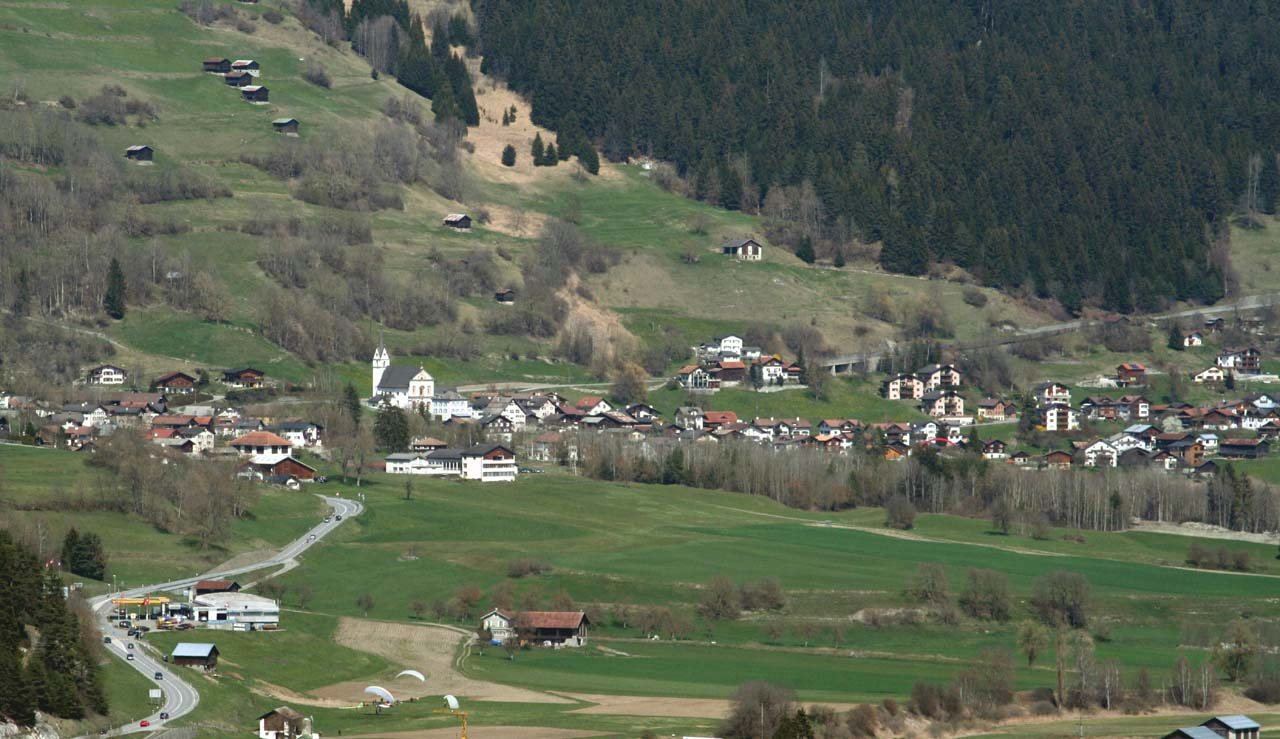
Schluein village

Aerial view (1949)

Schluein has an area, as of 2006, of 4.8 km^{2} (1.9 sq mi). Of this area, 29.9% is used for agricultural purposes, while 55.7% is forested. Of the rest of the land, 7.1% is settled (buildings or roads) and the remainder (7.3%) is non-productive (rivers, glaciers or mountains).

Before 2017, the municipality was located in the Ilanz sub-district of the Surselva district on the left flank of the Gruob. It consists of the villages of Schluein, Casanova, and Fallerin. Until 1983 Schluein was known as Schleuis.

== Demographics ==
Schluein has a population (as of 31 December 2020) of 611. As of 2008, 10.0% of the population was made up of foreign nationals. Over the last 10 years the population has decreased at a rate of -2.3%. Most of the population (as of 2000) speaks Romansh (53.2%), with German being second most common (28.2%) and Serbo-Croatian being third ( 3.2%).

As of 2000, the gender distribution of the population was 53.1% male and 46.9% female. The age distribution, as of 2000, in Schluein is; 77 children or 12.8% of the population are between 0 and 9 years old and 76 teenagers or 12.6% are between 10 and 19. Of the adult population, 87 people or 14.5% of the population are between 20 and 29 years old. 133 people or 22.1% are between 30 and 39, 83 people or 13.8% are between 40 and 49, and 53 people or 8.8% are between 50 and 59. The senior population distribution is 44 people or 7.3% of the population are between 60 and 69 years old, 34 people or 5.6% are between 70 and 79, there are 14 people or 2.3% who are between 80 and 89 there is 1 person who is between 90 and 99.

In the 2007 federal election the most popular party was the CVP which received 36% of the vote. The next three most popular parties were the SVP (27.3%), the FDP (20.3%) and the SP (16.5%).

In Schluein about 63.5% of the population (between age 25–64) have completed either non-mandatory upper secondary education or additional higher education (either university or a Fachhochschule).

Schluein has an unemployment rate of 1.87%. As of 2005, there were 30 people employed in the primary economic sector and about 10 businesses involved in this sector. 59 people are employed in the secondary sector and there are 13 businesses in this sector. 104 people are employed in the tertiary sector, with 22 businesses in this sector.

The historical population is given in the following table:

year	population
1850	366
1900	424
1930	593
1950	554
2000	602

== Heritage sites of national significance ==
The Church of SS. Peder e Paul is listed as a Swiss heritage site of national significance.

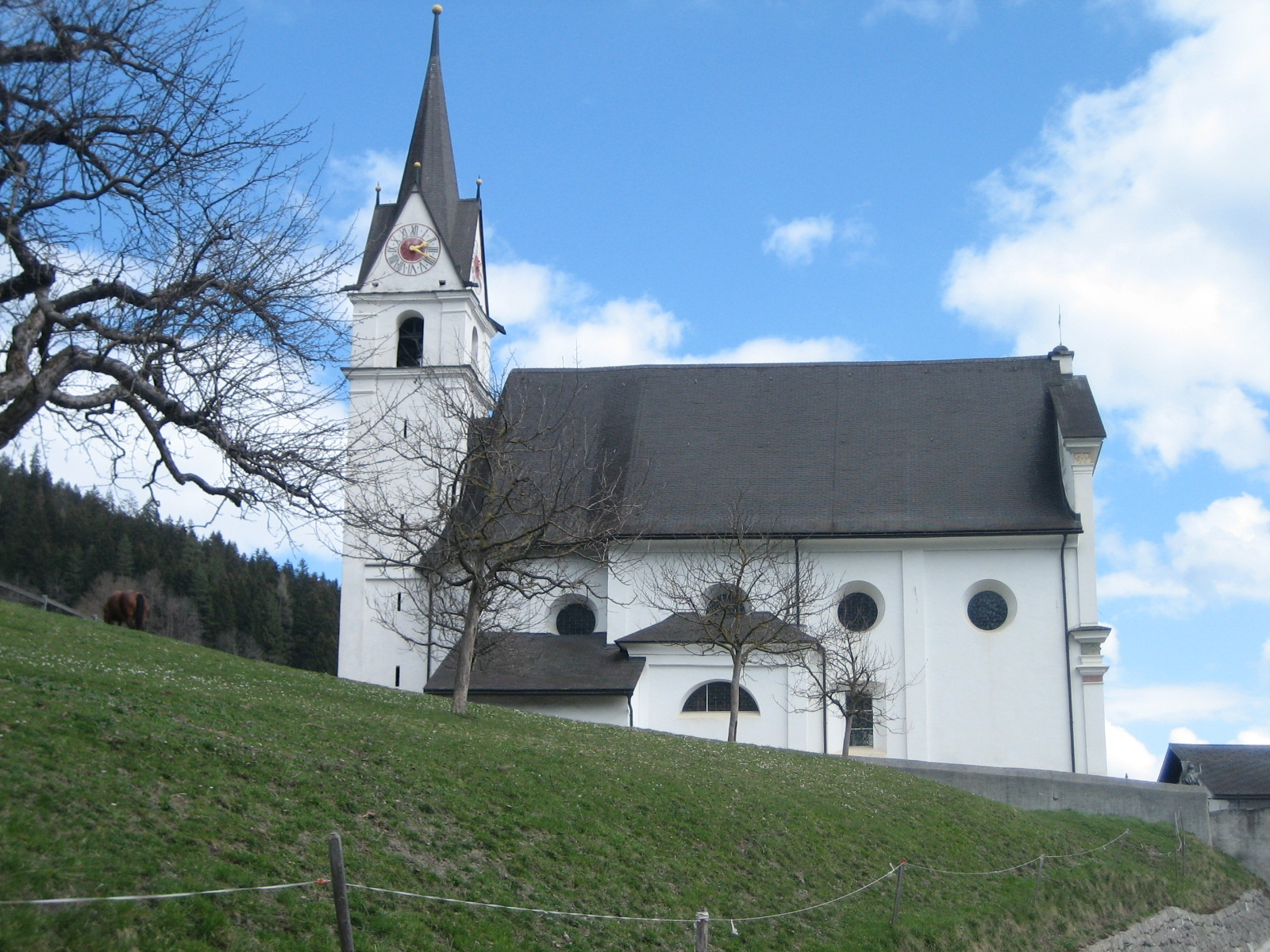
Church of SS. Peder e Paul

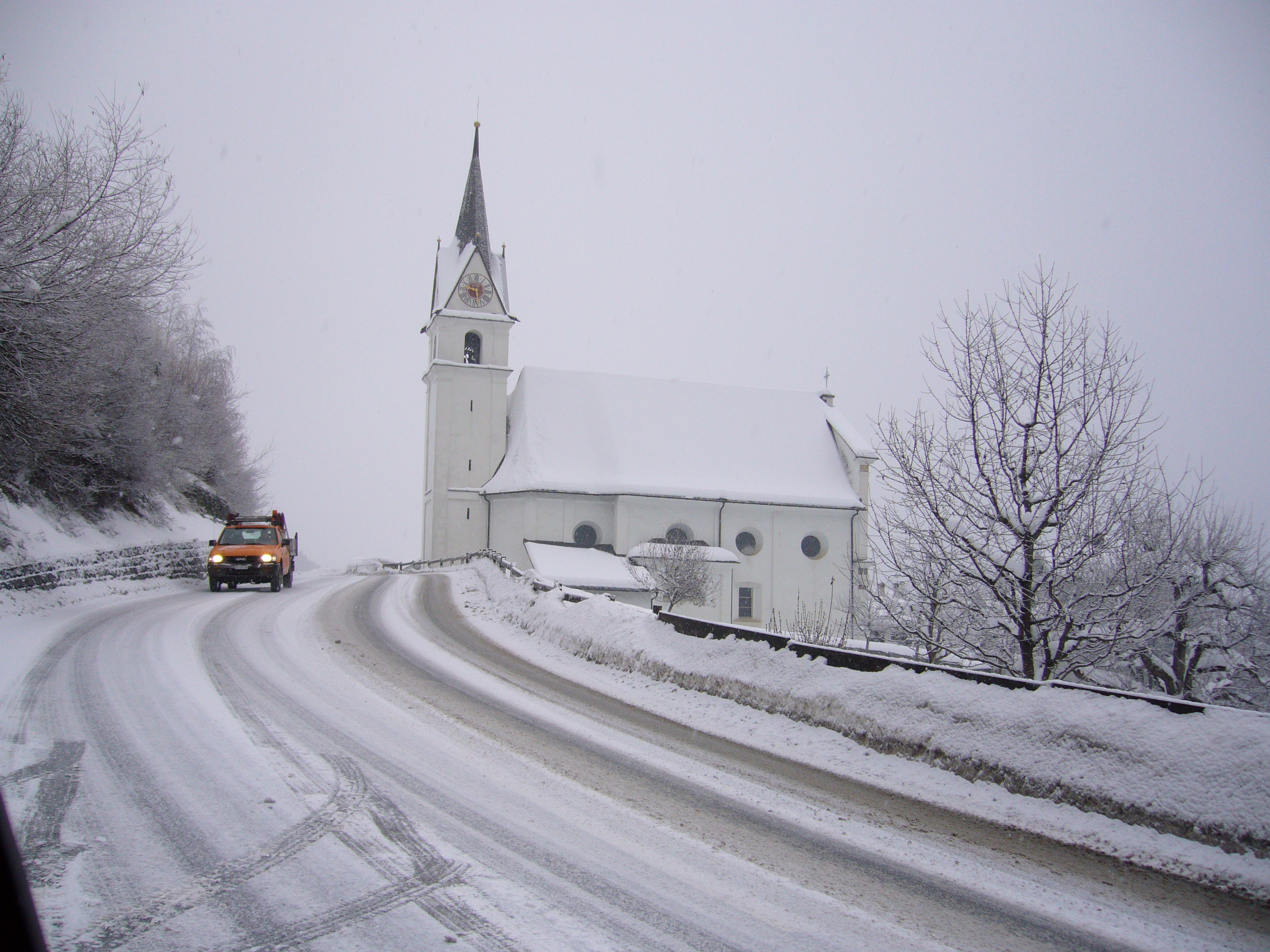
Village church in winter

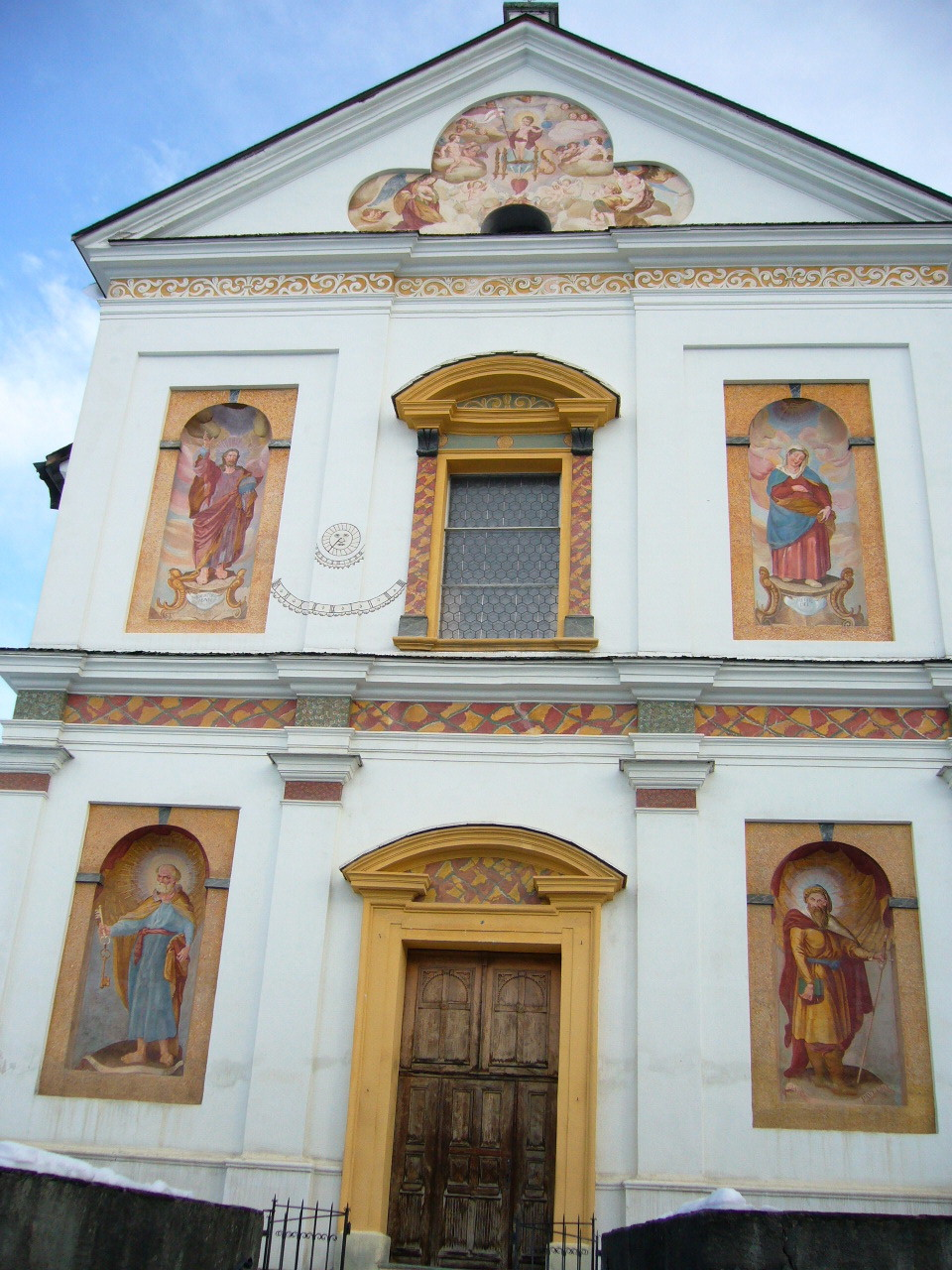
Front facade of the church
