= Ilanz =

- Former municipality
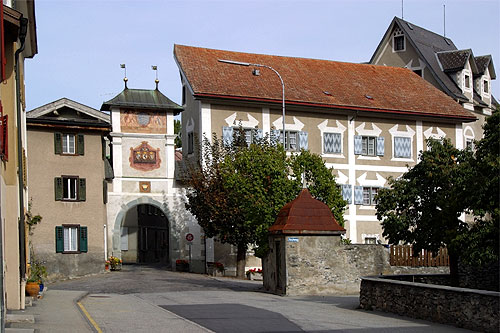

- Flag Coat of arms
- Location of Ilanz
- Location within Switzerland Location within Canton of Grisons
- Coordinates: 46°46′N 9°12′E
- Country: Switzerland
- Canton: Grisons
- District: Surselva

Government
  - Mayor: Gemeindepräsident/President (list); Aurelio Casanova (as of 2016)

Area
  - Total: 4.50 km^{2} (1.74 sq mi)
- Elevation (both churches): 699 m (2,293 ft)

Population (Dec 2011)
  - Total: 2,327
  - Density: 517/km^{2} (1,340/sq mi)
- Time zone: UTC+01:00 (CET)
  - Summer (DST): UTC+02:00 (CEST)
- Postal code: 7130
- SFOS number: 3574
- ISO 3166 code: CH-GR
- Surrounded by: Castrisch, Flond, Luven, Rueun, Ruschein, Schluein, Schnaus, Sevgein
- Website: www.ilanz.ch

Ilanz (Romansh: Glion) is a former municipality in the district of Surselva in the Swiss canton of the Grisons. The former municipality of Ilanz was congruent with the town of Ilanz. On 1 January 1978, the former municipality of Strada merged into the new municipality of Ilanz. On 1 January 2014, the municipality of Ilanz and the surrounding municipalities Castrisch, Ladir, Luven, Pitasch, Riein, Ruschein, Schnaus, Sevgein, Duvin, Pigniu, Rueun and Siat merged into the new municipality of Ilanz/Glion.

== History ==
Ilanz is first mentioned in 765 as "Iliande." Ilanz became the capital of the newly formed Grey League in 1395. The Grey League was the second of the Three Leagues which eventually formed canton of the Grisons. Johannes von Ilanz, the Abbot of Disentis, was among the three nobles instrumental in creating this "eternal alliance."

Ilanz has a special place in the history of the Protestant Reformation. In the 1520s, the Diet of Ilanz declared that citizens of the Three Leagues should be free to choose between Catholicism and the Protestant forms of Christianity then rising to the fore. The so-called "Ilanz Reformation" of 1526 resulted in another systemic shock to the Catholic Church (which had been under philosophical attack since Zürich in 1523, when Protestantism first rose to primacy in a major population center). These and other events resulted in a counter-reformation within the Swiss Confederation that reversed many of the gains of the Reformation in Switzerland.

== Geography ==
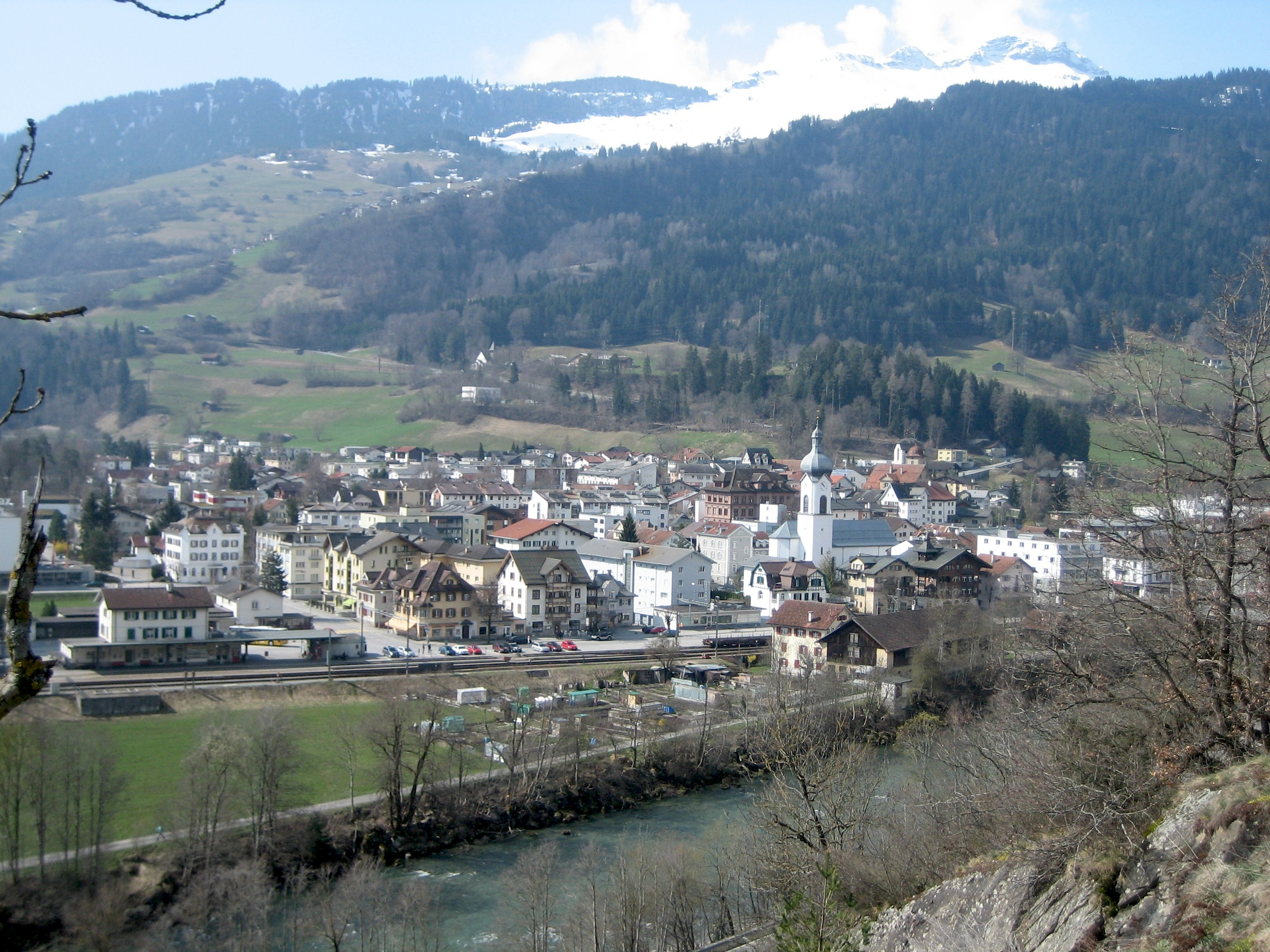
Ilanz 2007

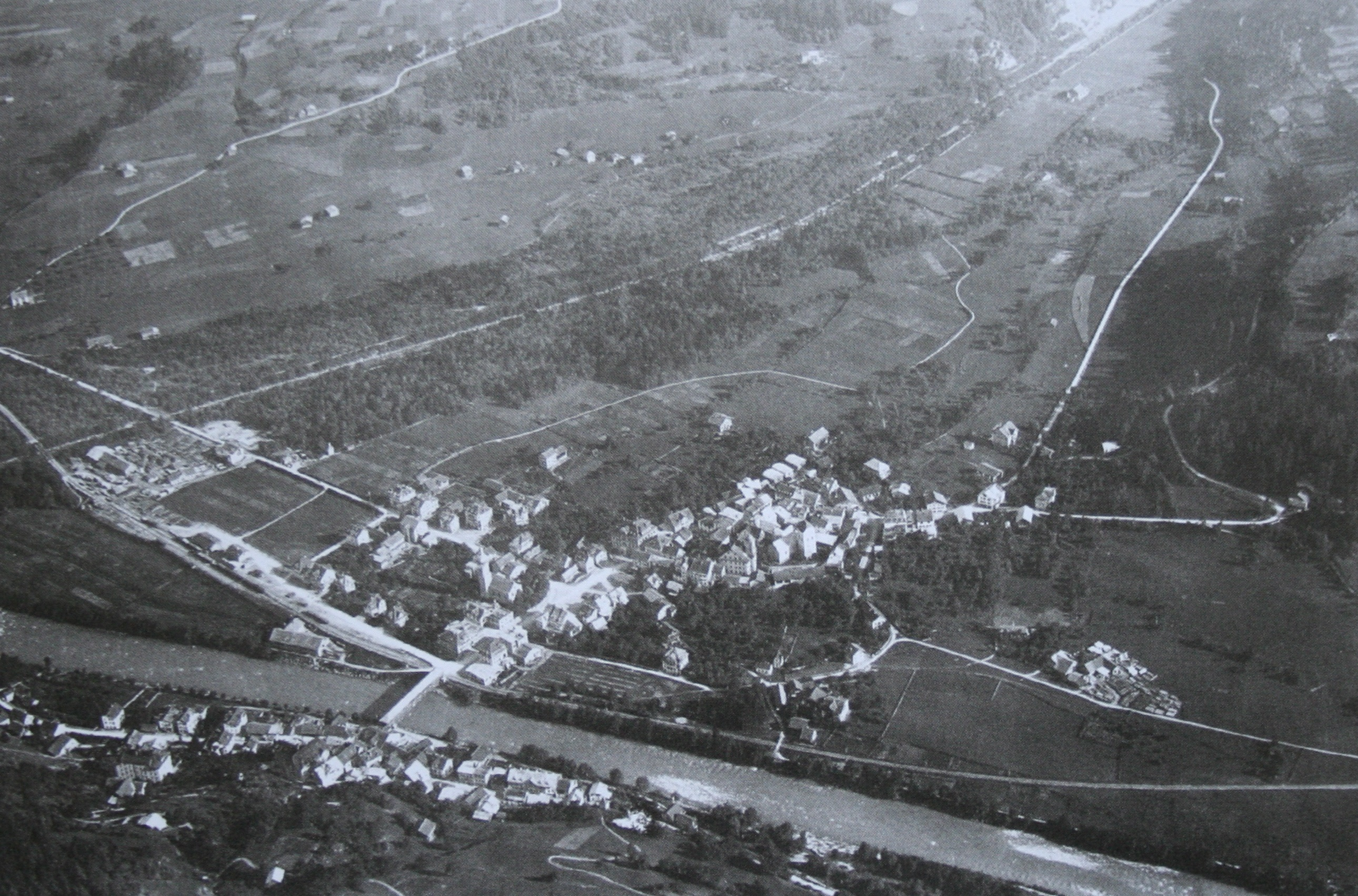
Ilanz 1923, Photography by Walter Mittelholzer

The town of Ilanz has a total area of 4.7 km^{2} (1.8 mi^{2}). Of this area, 24.9% is used for agricultural purposes, while 50.6% is forested. Of the rest of the land, 18.7% is settled (buildings or roads) and the remainder (5.7%) is non-productive (rivers, glaciers or mountains).

It is located in the Ilanz sub-district of the Surselva district. It is the first town on the Rhine; the Rhine headwaters gather here to become the valley of the Vorderrhein.

Ilanz is the market town for the surrounding area. It is also the nearest major town to the Weisse Arena ski resort situated just further up the valley. In Ilanz are the major train station, supermarket, and nearest hospital of the area.

The town is situated at a fork of the Surselva and the Vrin/Vals valley, which is split by Piz Mundaun. The neighbouring villages of Ruschein and Ladir are accessed from Ilanz, as well as Vrin, Vals, and Obersaxen.

== Demographics ==
Ilanz had a population (as of 2011) of 2,327. As of 2008, 15.4% of the population was made up of foreign nationals. Over the last 10 years the population has grown at a rate of 0.8%. Most of the population (as of 2000) speaks German (59.3%), with Romansh being the second most common (29.9%).

As of 2000, the gender distribution of the population was 45.2% male and 54.8% female. The age distribution, as of 2000, in Ilanz is; 247 children or 9.9% of the population are between 0 and 9 years old and 348 teenagers or 14.0% are between 10 and 19. Of the adult population, 306 people, or 12.3% of the population are between 20 and 29 years old. 378 people or 15.2% are between 30 and 39, 347 people, or 13.9% are between 40 and 49, and 285 people or 11.5% are between 50 and 59. The senior population distribution is 208 people or 8.4% of the population are between 60 and 69 years old, 200 people, or 8.0% are between 70 and 79, there are 138 people, or 5.5% who are between 80 and 89 there are 31 people or 1.2% who are between 90 and 99.

In the 2007 federal election, the most popular party was the CVP which received 47.3% of the vote. The next three most popular parties were the SVP (22.7%), the FDP (14.5%), and the SP (12.8%).

The entire Swiss population is generally well-educated. In Ilanz about 67.3% of the population (between ages 25–64) have completed either non-mandatory upper secondary education or additional higher education (either university or a Fachhochschule).

Ilanz has an unemployment rate of 1.44%. As of 2005, there were 24 people employed in the primary economic sector and about 8 businesses involved in this sector. 550 people are employed in the secondary sector and there are 39 businesses in this sector. 2,073 people are employed in the tertiary sector, with 202 businesses in this sector.

From the 2000 census, 1,577, or 63.4% are Roman Catholic, while 562, or 22.6% belonged to the Swiss Reformed Church. Of the rest of the population, there are 94 individuals (or about 3.78% of the population) belong to the Orthodox Church, and there are 19 individuals (or about 0.76% of the population) belong to another Christian church. There are 89 (or about 3.58% of the population) who are Islamic. There are 8 individuals (or about 0.32% of the population) who belong to another church (not listed on the census), 76 (or about 3.05% of the population) belong to no church, are agnostic or atheist, and 63 individuals (or about 2.53% of the population) did not answer the question.

The historical population is given in the following table:

| year | population |
|---|---|
| 1835 | 574 |
| 1850 | 663^{a} |
| 1900 | 981 |
| 1950 | 1,640 |
| 2000 | 2,488 |

^a Population includes Strada

== Politics ==
Mayors of Ilanz (Stadtammann von Ilanz)
| Term | Mayor | Lifespan | Party | Notes |
|---|---|---|---|---|
| 1497–1498 | Casper Franz | | | |
| 1975–1978 | Donat Cadruvi | (1923–1998) | | |
| | Aurelio Casanova | | | |
| 2002–2005 | Rino Caduff | | | First term |
| 2005–2011 | Martin Montalta | | BDP | |
| 2011–2013 | Rino Caduff | | | Second term. Last mayor of Ilanz |

== Weather ==
Ilanz has an average of 112.6 days of rain per year and on average receives 952 mm (37.5 in) of precipitation. The wettest month is August, during which time Ilanz receives an average of 102 mm (4.0 in) of precipitation. During this month there is precipitation for an average of 11.4 days. The month with the most days of precipitation is June, with an average of 11.5, but with only 93 mm (3.7 in) of precipitation. The driest month of the year is October with an average of 63 mm (2.5 in) of precipitation over 11.4 days.

== Heritage sites of national significance ==
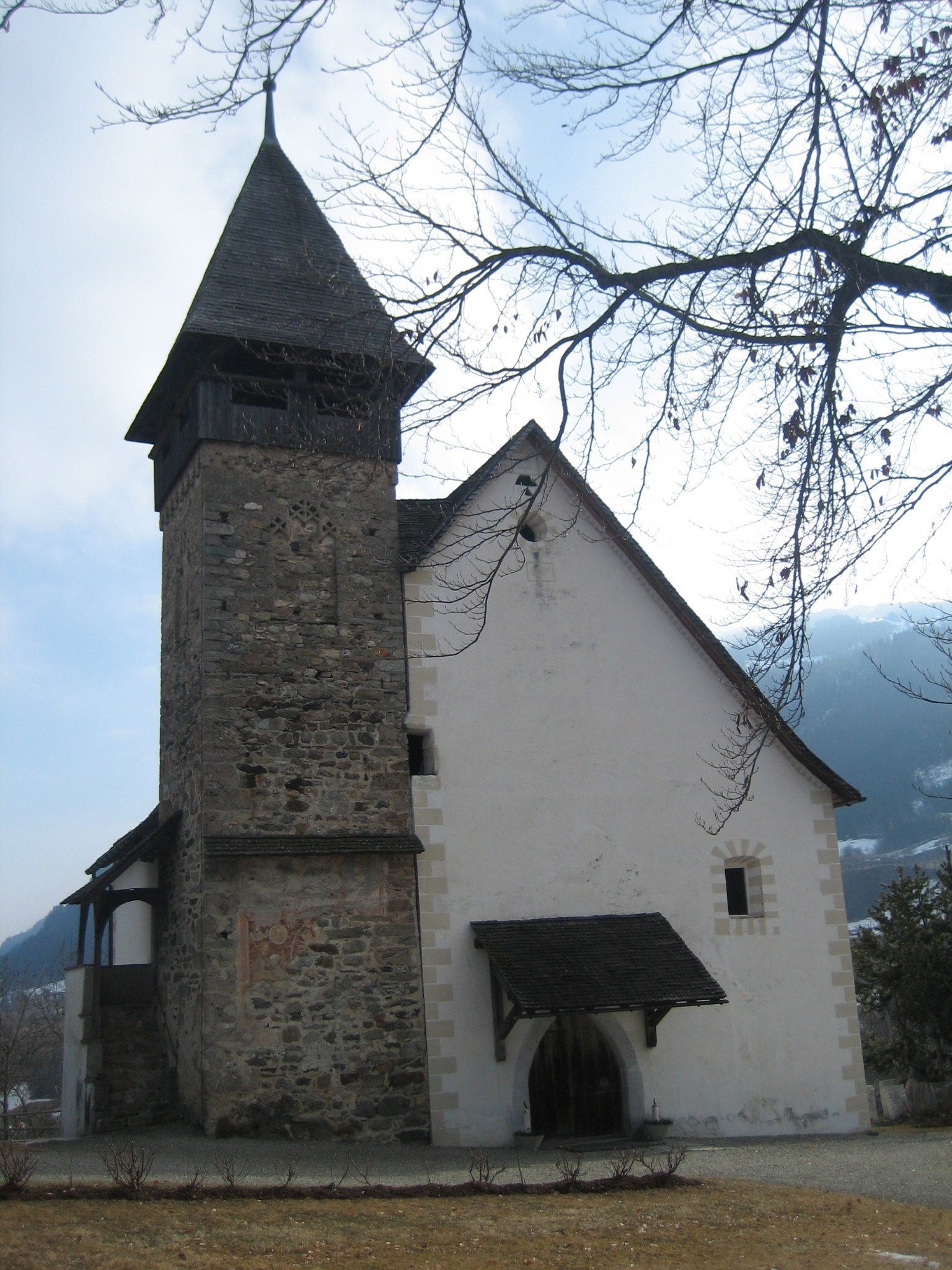
Church of St. Martin

The Church of St. Margreta and the Church of St. Martin are listed as Swiss heritage sites of national significance.

=== Other sites ===
The ruins of Grüneck Castle (Ruine Grüneck), destroyed before 1544, are visible today. A Carolingian hoard of two ornately decorated salt containers and coins was discovered near the ruins of the castle in 1811. One of the containers, which is made from antler and is T-shaped, is now kept in the British Museum. A hoard of forty Carolingian gold coins, including nine deniers, known as the Ilanz Hoard was discovered near the castle in 1904. In addition to the Carolingian coins, the horde contained Lombard and Arab coins. About 142 coins from discoveries near the castle are kept at the Rätisches Museum in Chur.

== Notable people ==
- Donat Cadruvi (1923–1998) a Swiss lawyer, politician, and Romansh-language writer. He was a member of the Swiss National Council 1963–1971 and Mayor of Ilanz 1975–1978
- Corina Casanova (born 1956 in Ilanz) the Federal Chancellor of Switzerland between 2008 and 2015
- Serafin Wiestner (born 1990 in Ilanz) a Swiss biathlete, he competed in the 2014 Winter Olympics

== Sociology ==
American university professor Robert H. Billigmeier spent his sabbaticals in Ilanz. Fluent in both German and Romansch, he was deeply interested in multiculturalism and authored several books, including the nationally acclaimed, Crisis in Swiss Pluralism, published in 1979. He was of German and Swiss origin with his maternal ancestry tracing back to Strada (now part of Ilanz/Glion).
