= Broder (disambiguation) =

Broder or Bröder (Broeder) is a surname.

Broder, Broeder, etc., may also refer to:

- Bróder, 2010 Brazilian film
- "Bröder", song by Linus Svenning
- Bröder (album), album by Sten & Stanley
- Broder (restaurant), chain of Scandinavian restaurants, Oregon, United States
- Broder singers, itinerant Yiddish performers
- Broeder, Dutch dish
- Broder (given name)
- 236800 Broder, minor planet

== See also ==
- Broda (disambiguation)
