= Little Bit Is Better Than Nada =

Song by Texas Tornados
- Language: English
- Released: 1996
- Genre: country, tejano
- Songwriter(s): Doug Sahm

Little Bit Is Better Than Nada is a song written by Doug Sahm, and recorded in 1996 by the Texas Tornados. The song was also film soundtrack for the 1996 film Tin Cup, and was Grammy nominated.

In 1998, Sten & Stanley recorded the song on the album Bröder, with lyrics in Swedish by Ingela "Pling" Forsman as En liten bit är bättre än nada.
