= Bröder (album) =

Studio album by Sten & Stanley
- Released: 1998
- Genre: Dansband music
- Length: circa 45 minutes
- Label: Scranta

Sten & Stanley chronology
De tidiga åren (1998)	Bröder (1998)	Stjärnan lyser klar (2000)

Bröder is a 1998 studio album by Sten & Stanley.

== Track listing ==
1. "Bröder"
2. "Högre och högre"
3. "Utan dig"
4. "Jag är från landet" ("I'm from the Country")
5. "Jag vill ha mer"
6. "Juliette" ("Julie Anne")
7. "Gryning över havet"
8. "En liten bit är bättre än nada" ("Little Bit Is Better Than Nada")
9. "Jag vill ha ett långt liv"
10. "Du är mitt liv"
11. "De' e' bara kärlek"
12. "Så'n är jag"
13. "Två Pina Coladas" ("Two Piña Coladas")
14. "Thank You for the Music" (duet with Tina Leijonberg)

== Charts ==
Chart (1998)	Peak position
Sweden	50
