= Broder (given name) =

Broder is a given name. Notable people with the name include:

- Broder Knud Brodersen Wigelsen (1787–1867), Danish naval officer
- Broder Knudtzon (1788–1864), Norwegian merchant, politician and benefactor
- Broder Lysholm Krohg (1777–1861), Norwegian military officer and civil servant
- Broder Svensson (died 1436), Swedish knight, military commander and privateer
