= List of minor planets: 236001–237000 =

The following is a partial list of minor planets, running from minor-planet number 236001 through 237000, inclusive. The primary data for this and other partial lists is based on JPL's "Small-Body Orbital Elements" and data available from the Minor Planet Center. Critical list information is also provided by the MPC, unless otherwise specified from Lowell Observatory. A detailed description of the table's columns and additional sources are given on the main page including a complete list of every page in this series, and a statistical break-up on the dynamical classification of minor planets.

Also see the summary list of all named bodies in numerical and alphabetical order, and the corresponding naming citations for the number range of this particular list. New namings may only be added to this list after official publication, as the preannouncement of names is condemned by the Working Group for Small Bodies Nomenclature of the International Astronomical Union.

| Near-Earth obj. | MBA (inner) | MBA (outer) | Centaur |
| Mars-crosser | MBA (middle) | Jupiter trojan | Trans-Neptunian obj. |
| Unclassified |

== 236001–236100 ==
| Designation | | | Discovery | | | Properties | | Ref |
| Permanent | Provisional | Named after | Date | Site | Discoverer(s) | Category | Diam. | Ref |
|---|---|---|---|---|---|---|---|---|
| 236001 | 2005 GB_{23} | — | April 1, 2005 | Anderson Mesa | LONEOS | EOS | 2.7 km | MPC; JPL |
| 236002 | 2005 GW_{23} | — | April 2, 2005 | Mount Lemmon | Mount Lemmon Survey | · | 5.0 km | MPC; JPL |
| 236003 | 2005 GA_{24} | — | April 2, 2005 | Mount Lemmon | Mount Lemmon Survey | · | 4.1 km | MPC; JPL |
| 236004 | 2005 GE_{27} | — | April 3, 2005 | Palomar | NEAT | · | 3.7 km | MPC; JPL |
| 236005 | 2005 GG_{29} | — | April 4, 2005 | Kitt Peak | Spacewatch | · | 3.4 km | MPC; JPL |
| 236006 | 2005 GQ_{31} | — | April 4, 2005 | Catalina | CSS | · | 3.6 km | MPC; JPL |
| 236007 | 2005 GA_{41} | — | April 4, 2005 | Socorro | LINEAR | · | 5.3 km | MPC; JPL |
| 236008 | 2005 GE_{45} | — | April 5, 2005 | Palomar | NEAT | GEF · | 3.8 km | MPC; JPL |
| 236009 | 2005 GC_{48} | — | April 5, 2005 | Mount Lemmon | Mount Lemmon Survey | · | 2.4 km | MPC; JPL |
| 236010 | 2005 GA_{71} | — | April 4, 2005 | Kitt Peak | Spacewatch | EOS | 2.7 km | MPC; JPL |
| 236011 | 2005 GN_{72} | — | April 4, 2005 | Catalina | CSS | EOS | 3.3 km | MPC; JPL |
| 236012 | 2005 GA_{78} | — | April 6, 2005 | Catalina | CSS | · | 4.4 km | MPC; JPL |
| 236013 | 2005 GU_{80} | — | April 7, 2005 | Mount Lemmon | Mount Lemmon Survey | · | 4.1 km | MPC; JPL |
| 236014 | 2005 GC_{82} | — | April 4, 2005 | Kitt Peak | Spacewatch | · | 2.4 km | MPC; JPL |
| 236015 | 2005 GM_{89} | — | April 5, 2005 | Mount Lemmon | Mount Lemmon Survey | THM | 4.1 km | MPC; JPL |
| 236016 | 2005 GJ_{94} | — | April 6, 2005 | Kitt Peak | Spacewatch | EUP | 4.4 km | MPC; JPL |
| 236017 | 2005 GD_{95} | — | April 6, 2005 | Kitt Peak | Spacewatch | · | 4.1 km | MPC; JPL |
| 236018 | 2005 GV_{96} | — | April 6, 2005 | Mount Lemmon | Mount Lemmon Survey | HYG | 3.9 km | MPC; JPL |
| 236019 | 2005 GT_{98} | — | April 7, 2005 | Kitt Peak | Spacewatch | EOS | 4.4 km | MPC; JPL |
| 236020 | 2005 GH_{105} | — | April 10, 2005 | Kitt Peak | Spacewatch | · | 4.4 km | MPC; JPL |
| 236021 | 2005 GR_{112} | — | April 6, 2005 | Kitt Peak | Spacewatch | · | 3.2 km | MPC; JPL |
| 236022 | 2005 GL_{121} | — | April 5, 2005 | Kitt Peak | Spacewatch | THM | 3.6 km | MPC; JPL |
| 236023 | 2005 GK_{122} | — | April 6, 2005 | Mount Lemmon | Mount Lemmon Survey | MRX | 1.3 km | MPC; JPL |
| 236024 | 2005 GQ_{128} | — | April 3, 2005 | Siding Spring | SSS | H | 990 m | MPC; JPL |
| 236025 | 2005 GN_{133} | — | April 10, 2005 | Kitt Peak | Spacewatch | · | 4.4 km | MPC; JPL |
| 236026 | 2005 GG_{139} | — | April 12, 2005 | Mount Lemmon | Mount Lemmon Survey | TIR | 2.8 km | MPC; JPL |
| 236027 | 2005 GM_{141} | — | April 6, 2005 | Kitt Peak | Spacewatch | · | 4.7 km | MPC; JPL |
| 236028 | 2005 GZ_{147} | — | April 11, 2005 | Kitt Peak | Spacewatch | HYG | 4.2 km | MPC; JPL |
| 236029 | 2005 GA_{152} | — | April 12, 2005 | Kitt Peak | Spacewatch | · | 3.1 km | MPC; JPL |
| 236030 | 2005 GL_{154} | — | April 9, 2005 | Socorro | LINEAR | · | 3.2 km | MPC; JPL |
| 236031 | 2005 GV_{160} | — | April 13, 2005 | Anderson Mesa | LONEOS | · | 2.8 km | MPC; JPL |
| 236032 | 2005 GY_{166} | — | April 11, 2005 | Junk Bond | Junk Bond | · | 3.2 km | MPC; JPL |
| 236033 | 2005 GQ_{170} | — | April 12, 2005 | Socorro | LINEAR | · | 2.1 km | MPC; JPL |
| 236034 | 2005 GS_{170} | — | April 12, 2005 | Anderson Mesa | LONEOS | · | 6.0 km | MPC; JPL |
| 236035 | 2005 GA_{171} | — | April 12, 2005 | Mount Lemmon | Mount Lemmon Survey | · | 4.5 km | MPC; JPL |
| 236036 | 2005 GW_{171} | — | April 13, 2005 | Anderson Mesa | LONEOS | · | 3.7 km | MPC; JPL |
| 236037 | 2005 GD_{179} | — | April 12, 2005 | Anderson Mesa | LONEOS | TIR | 4.0 km | MPC; JPL |
| 236038 | 2005 GW_{179} | — | April 5, 2005 | Catalina | CSS | EUP | 4.6 km | MPC; JPL |
| 236039 | 2005 GJ_{181} | — | April 12, 2005 | Kitt Peak | Spacewatch | · | 3.3 km | MPC; JPL |
| 236040 | 2005 GP_{182} | — | April 1, 2005 | Kitt Peak | Spacewatch | EOS | 2.5 km | MPC; JPL |
| 236041 | 2005 GN_{210} | — | April 12, 2005 | Anderson Mesa | LONEOS | · | 5.0 km | MPC; JPL |
| 236042 | 2005 GA_{220} | — | April 4, 2005 | Mount Lemmon | Mount Lemmon Survey | · | 2.7 km | MPC; JPL |
| 236043 | 2005 GU_{221} | — | April 7, 2005 | Kitt Peak | Spacewatch | · | 4.2 km | MPC; JPL |
| 236044 | 2005 GG_{222} | — | April 9, 2005 | Kitt Peak | Spacewatch | · | 4.7 km | MPC; JPL |
| 236045 | 2005 HU_{1} | — | April 16, 2005 | Vail-Jarnac | Jarnac | · | 3.6 km | MPC; JPL |
| 236046 | 2005 HC_{2} | — | April 16, 2005 | Kitt Peak | Spacewatch | · | 3.2 km | MPC; JPL |
| 236047 | 2005 HL_{7} | — | April 30, 2005 | Kitt Peak | Spacewatch | HYG | 3.4 km | MPC; JPL |
| 236048 | 2005 JV_{2} | — | May 3, 2005 | Kitt Peak | Spacewatch | · | 2.2 km | MPC; JPL |
| 236049 | 2005 JO_{4} | — | May 1, 2005 | Kitt Peak | Spacewatch | · | 5.6 km | MPC; JPL |
| 236050 | 2005 JL_{5} | — | May 6, 2005 | Catalina | CSS | H | 730 m | MPC; JPL |
| 236051 | 2005 JV_{13} | — | May 1, 2005 | Palomar | NEAT | · | 5.0 km | MPC; JPL |
| 236052 | 2005 JQ_{19} | — | May 4, 2005 | Kitt Peak | Spacewatch | · | 3.2 km | MPC; JPL |
| 236053 | 2005 JJ_{20} | — | May 4, 2005 | Catalina | CSS | THB | 3.8 km | MPC; JPL |
| 236054 | 2005 JJ_{22} | — | May 8, 2005 | Mayhill | Lowe, A. | LIX | 5.5 km | MPC; JPL |
| 236055 | 2005 JD_{23} | — | May 2, 2005 | Kitt Peak | Spacewatch | · | 2.4 km | MPC; JPL |
| 236056 | 2005 JK_{23} | — | May 2, 2005 | Bergisch Gladbach | W. Bickel | · | 2.9 km | MPC; JPL |
| 236057 | 2005 JN_{26} | — | May 3, 2005 | Kitt Peak | Spacewatch | · | 3.6 km | MPC; JPL |
| 236058 | 2005 JE_{29} | — | May 3, 2005 | Kitt Peak | Spacewatch | · | 5.3 km | MPC; JPL |
| 236059 | 2005 JH_{38} | — | May 6, 2005 | Kitt Peak | Spacewatch | · | 5.2 km | MPC; JPL |
| 236060 | 2005 JY_{46} | — | May 3, 2005 | Kitt Peak | Spacewatch | THM | 2.6 km | MPC; JPL |
| 236061 | 2005 JF_{64} | — | May 10, 2005 | Mayhill | Lowe, A. | · | 3.7 km | MPC; JPL |
| 236062 | 2005 JV_{64} | — | May 4, 2005 | Kitt Peak | Spacewatch | HYG | 3.0 km | MPC; JPL |
| 236063 | 2005 JB_{67} | — | May 4, 2005 | Catalina | CSS | · | 5.2 km | MPC; JPL |
| 236064 | 2005 JA_{71} | — | May 7, 2005 | Catalina | CSS | · | 3.3 km | MPC; JPL |
| 236065 | 2005 JZ_{76} | — | May 9, 2005 | Catalina | CSS | · | 6.2 km | MPC; JPL |
| 236066 | 2005 JU_{80} | — | May 9, 2005 | Catalina | CSS | · | 4.2 km | MPC; JPL |
| 236067 | 2005 JQ_{84} | — | May 8, 2005 | Catalina | CSS | · | 3.3 km | MPC; JPL |
| 236068 | 2005 JV_{88} | — | May 10, 2005 | Catalina | CSS | H | 680 m | MPC; JPL |
| 236069 | 2005 JZ_{98} | — | May 9, 2005 | Mount Lemmon | Mount Lemmon Survey | · | 3.2 km | MPC; JPL |
| 236070 | 2005 JT_{100} | — | May 9, 2005 | Anderson Mesa | LONEOS | · | 3.5 km | MPC; JPL |
| 236071 | 2005 JU_{102} | — | May 9, 2005 | Catalina | CSS | VER | 4.0 km | MPC; JPL |
| 236072 | 2005 JK_{121} | — | May 10, 2005 | Kitt Peak | Spacewatch | HYG | 5.1 km | MPC; JPL |
| 236073 | 2005 JK_{122} | — | May 11, 2005 | Palomar | NEAT | · | 3.2 km | MPC; JPL |
| 236074 | 2005 JW_{126} | — | May 12, 2005 | Mount Lemmon | Mount Lemmon Survey | · | 4.2 km | MPC; JPL |
| 236075 | 2005 JH_{136} | — | May 11, 2005 | Catalina | CSS | LIX | 5.2 km | MPC; JPL |
| 236076 | 2005 JR_{137} | — | May 13, 2005 | Kitt Peak | Spacewatch | EOS | 3.4 km | MPC; JPL |
| 236077 | 2005 JM_{148} | — | May 6, 2005 | Catalina | CSS | · | 3.9 km | MPC; JPL |
| 236078 | 2005 JF_{150} | — | May 3, 2005 | Kitt Peak | Spacewatch | HYG | 2.9 km | MPC; JPL |
| 236079 | 2005 JK_{158} | — | May 6, 2005 | Catalina | CSS | · | 3.9 km | MPC; JPL |
| 236080 | 2005 JZ_{158} | — | May 7, 2005 | Kitt Peak | Spacewatch | · | 4.0 km | MPC; JPL |
| 236081 | 2005 JY_{160} | — | May 8, 2005 | Kitt Peak | Spacewatch | · | 3.5 km | MPC; JPL |
| 236082 | 2005 JE_{176} | — | May 4, 2005 | Catalina | CSS | · | 2.8 km | MPC; JPL |
| 236083 | 2005 JA_{185} | — | May 1, 2005 | Siding Spring | SSS | TIR | 3.1 km | MPC; JPL |
| 236084 | 2005 KJ | — | May 16, 2005 | Kitt Peak | Spacewatch | · | 4.5 km | MPC; JPL |
| 236085 | 2005 KO_{3} | — | May 17, 2005 | Mount Lemmon | Mount Lemmon Survey | · | 4.0 km | MPC; JPL |
| 236086 | 2005 KW_{11} | — | May 29, 2005 | Reedy Creek | J. Broughton | · | 2.9 km | MPC; JPL |
| 236087 | 2005 LH_{2} | — | June 2, 2005 | Catalina | CSS | · | 4.0 km | MPC; JPL |
| 236088 | 2005 LZ_{10} | — | June 3, 2005 | Kitt Peak | Spacewatch | · | 3.7 km | MPC; JPL |
| 236089 | 2005 LB_{41} | — | June 10, 2005 | Kitt Peak | Spacewatch | · | 3.2 km | MPC; JPL |
| 236090 | 2005 LM_{45} | — | June 13, 2005 | Kitt Peak | Spacewatch | · | 3.7 km | MPC; JPL |
| 236091 | 2005 LO_{51} | — | June 14, 2005 | Kitt Peak | Spacewatch | LIX | 4.6 km | MPC; JPL |
| 236092 | 2005 MN_{10} | — | June 27, 2005 | Kitt Peak | Spacewatch | HYG | 2.8 km | MPC; JPL |
| 236093 | 2005 MQ_{10} | — | June 27, 2005 | Kitt Peak | Spacewatch | · | 3.1 km | MPC; JPL |
| 236094 | 2005 MV_{34} | — | June 29, 2005 | Palomar | NEAT | · | 2.6 km | MPC; JPL |
| 236095 | 2005 NB | — | July 1, 2005 | Socorro | LINEAR | · | 2.3 km | MPC; JPL |
| 236096 | 2005 NM_{36} | — | July 6, 2005 | Kitt Peak | Spacewatch | · | 3.1 km | MPC; JPL |
| 236097 | 2005 NS_{88} | — | July 4, 2005 | Mount Lemmon | Mount Lemmon Survey | · | 1.9 km | MPC; JPL |
| 236098 | 2005 OD_{8} | — | July 30, 2005 | Socorro | LINEAR | EUP | 6.7 km | MPC; JPL |
| 236099 | 2005 OV_{28} | — | July 27, 2005 | Siding Spring | SSS | LIX | 5.6 km | MPC; JPL |
| 236100 | 2005 PY_{14} | — | August 4, 2005 | Palomar | NEAT | HIL · 3:2 | 9.8 km | MPC; JPL |

== 236101–236200 ==
back to top

| Designation | | | Discovery | | | Properties | | Ref |
| Permanent | Provisional | Named after | Date | Site | Discoverer(s) | Category | Diam. | Ref |
|---|---|---|---|---|---|---|---|---|
| 236101 | 2005 QK_{2} | — | August 24, 2005 | Palomar | NEAT | LIX | 5.7 km | MPC; JPL |
| 236102 | 2005 QQ_{51} | — | August 27, 2005 | Kitt Peak | Spacewatch | · | 4.5 km | MPC; JPL |
| 236103 | 2005 QQ_{53} | — | August 28, 2005 | Kitt Peak | Spacewatch | 3:2 · SHU | 6.6 km | MPC; JPL |
| 236104 | 2005 QJ_{71} | — | August 29, 2005 | Socorro | LINEAR | · | 1.1 km | MPC; JPL |
| 236105 | 2005 QJ_{75} | — | August 29, 2005 | Kitt Peak | Spacewatch | · | 780 m | MPC; JPL |
| 236106 | 2005 QU_{84} | — | August 30, 2005 | Socorro | LINEAR | · | 1.2 km | MPC; JPL |
| 236107 | 2005 QE_{94} | — | August 27, 2005 | Palomar | NEAT | · | 5.9 km | MPC; JPL |
| 236108 | 2005 QB_{96} | — | August 27, 2005 | Haleakala | NEAT | · | 5.7 km | MPC; JPL |
| 236109 | 2005 QG_{113} | — | August 27, 2005 | Palomar | NEAT | · | 810 m | MPC; JPL |
| 236110 | 2005 QO_{190} | — | August 28, 2005 | Siding Spring | SSS | · | 2.2 km | MPC; JPL |
| 236111 Wolfgangbüttner | 2005 RW_{4} | Wolfgangbüttner | September 7, 2005 | Radebeul | M. Fiedler | · | 900 m | MPC; JPL |
| 236112 | 2005 SP_{7} | — | September 24, 2005 | Kitt Peak | Spacewatch | · | 920 m | MPC; JPL |
| 236113 | 2005 SC_{21} | — | September 26, 2005 | Goodricke-Pigott | R. A. Tucker | · | 3.0 km | MPC; JPL |
| 236114 | 2005 SL_{61} | — | September 26, 2005 | Kitt Peak | Spacewatch | 3:2 · SHU | 7.1 km | MPC; JPL |
| 236115 | 2005 SZ_{103} | — | September 25, 2005 | Palomar | NEAT | · | 1.1 km | MPC; JPL |
| 236116 | 2005 SX_{104} | — | September 25, 2005 | Palomar | NEAT | CYB | 6.9 km | MPC; JPL |
| 236117 | 2005 SA_{112} | — | September 26, 2005 | Palomar | NEAT | · | 950 m | MPC; JPL |
| 236118 | 2005 SJ_{116} | — | September 27, 2005 | Kitt Peak | Spacewatch | 3:2 | 7.6 km | MPC; JPL |
| 236119 | 2005 SE_{124} | — | September 29, 2005 | Anderson Mesa | LONEOS | HIL · 3:2 · (6124) | 9.1 km | MPC; JPL |
| 236120 | 2005 SS_{137} | — | September 24, 2005 | Kitt Peak | Spacewatch | · | 880 m | MPC; JPL |
| 236121 | 2005 SZ_{143} | — | September 25, 2005 | Kitt Peak | Spacewatch | · | 640 m | MPC; JPL |
| 236122 | 2005 SQ_{151} | — | September 25, 2005 | Kitt Peak | Spacewatch | · | 1.8 km | MPC; JPL |
| 236123 | 2005 SQ_{157} | — | September 26, 2005 | Kitt Peak | Spacewatch | · | 690 m | MPC; JPL |
| 236124 | 2005 SZ_{190} | — | September 29, 2005 | Goodricke-Pigott | R. A. Tucker | · | 1.0 km | MPC; JPL |
| 236125 | 2005 SA_{215} | — | September 30, 2005 | Catalina | CSS | · | 1.3 km | MPC; JPL |
| 236126 | 2005 SB_{272} | — | September 27, 2005 | Socorro | LINEAR | T_{j} (2.99) · HIL · 3:2 · (6124) | 8.6 km | MPC; JPL |
| 236127 | 2005 SH_{291} | — | September 23, 2005 | Kitt Peak | Spacewatch | · | 810 m | MPC; JPL |
| 236128 | 2005 TK_{14} | — | October 2, 2005 | Palomar | NEAT | · | 1.3 km | MPC; JPL |
| 236129 Oysterbay | 2005 TJ_{17} | Oysterbay | October 1, 2005 | Catalina | CSS | · | 820 m | MPC; JPL |
| 236130 | 2005 TW_{24} | — | October 1, 2005 | Mount Lemmon | Mount Lemmon Survey | · | 1.4 km | MPC; JPL |
| 236131 | 2005 TM_{29} | — | October 2, 2005 | Anderson Mesa | LONEOS | · | 1.2 km | MPC; JPL |
| 236132 | 2005 TB_{40} | — | October 1, 2005 | Kitt Peak | Spacewatch | · | 910 m | MPC; JPL |
| 236133 | 2005 TC_{45} | — | October 5, 2005 | Mount Lemmon | Mount Lemmon Survey | · | 860 m | MPC; JPL |
| 236134 | 2005 TX_{57} | — | October 1, 2005 | Mount Lemmon | Mount Lemmon Survey | · | 1.0 km | MPC; JPL |
| 236135 | 2005 TE_{112} | — | October 7, 2005 | Kitt Peak | Spacewatch | · | 1.7 km | MPC; JPL |
| 236136 | 2005 TH_{168} | — | October 9, 2005 | Kitt Peak | Spacewatch | · | 1.4 km | MPC; JPL |
| 236137 | 2005 TN_{180} | — | October 1, 2005 | Kitt Peak | Spacewatch | · | 980 m | MPC; JPL |
| 236138 | 2005 UJ_{4} | — | October 25, 2005 | Goodricke-Pigott | R. A. Tucker | PHO | 3.8 km | MPC; JPL |
| 236139 | 2005 UE_{17} | — | October 22, 2005 | Kitt Peak | Spacewatch | · | 840 m | MPC; JPL |
| 236140 | 2005 US_{18} | — | October 22, 2005 | Kitt Peak | Spacewatch | · | 1.0 km | MPC; JPL |
| 236141 | 2005 UG_{52} | — | October 23, 2005 | Catalina | CSS | · | 750 m | MPC; JPL |
| 236142 | 2005 UC_{64} | — | October 25, 2005 | Catalina | CSS | · | 1.1 km | MPC; JPL |
| 236143 | 2005 UM_{96} | — | October 22, 2005 | Kitt Peak | Spacewatch | · | 890 m | MPC; JPL |
| 236144 | 2005 UU_{103} | — | October 22, 2005 | Kitt Peak | Spacewatch | · | 1.7 km | MPC; JPL |
| 236145 | 2005 UK_{105} | — | October 22, 2005 | Kitt Peak | Spacewatch | · | 900 m | MPC; JPL |
| 236146 | 2005 UA_{109} | — | October 22, 2005 | Palomar | NEAT | · | 970 m | MPC; JPL |
| 236147 | 2005 UG_{151} | — | October 26, 2005 | Kitt Peak | Spacewatch | SUL | 2.6 km | MPC; JPL |
| 236148 | 2005 UT_{152} | — | October 26, 2005 | Kitt Peak | Spacewatch | · | 1.4 km | MPC; JPL |
| 236149 | 2005 UD_{171} | — | October 24, 2005 | Kitt Peak | Spacewatch | · | 820 m | MPC; JPL |
| 236150 | 2005 UN_{177} | — | October 24, 2005 | Kitt Peak | Spacewatch | · | 680 m | MPC; JPL |
| 236151 | 2005 UU_{199} | — | October 25, 2005 | Kitt Peak | Spacewatch | · | 730 m | MPC; JPL |
| 236152 | 2005 UF_{222} | — | October 25, 2005 | Kitt Peak | Spacewatch | · | 1.4 km | MPC; JPL |
| 236153 | 2005 UC_{233} | — | October 25, 2005 | Kitt Peak | Spacewatch | · | 840 m | MPC; JPL |
| 236154 | 2005 UM_{245} | — | October 25, 2005 | Kitt Peak | Spacewatch | · | 980 m | MPC; JPL |
| 236155 | 2005 UL_{251} | — | October 23, 2005 | Palomar | NEAT | · | 1.0 km | MPC; JPL |
| 236156 | 2005 UL_{291} | — | October 26, 2005 | Kitt Peak | Spacewatch | · | 960 m | MPC; JPL |
| 236157 | 2005 UB_{344} | — | October 29, 2005 | Kitt Peak | Spacewatch | · | 880 m | MPC; JPL |
| 236158 | 2005 UY_{353} | — | October 29, 2005 | Catalina | CSS | · | 1.2 km | MPC; JPL |
| 236159 | 2005 UR_{355} | — | October 29, 2005 | Mount Lemmon | Mount Lemmon Survey | · | 680 m | MPC; JPL |
| 236160 | 2005 UM_{371} | — | October 27, 2005 | Mount Lemmon | Mount Lemmon Survey | · | 960 m | MPC; JPL |
| 236161 | 2005 UQ_{409} | — | October 31, 2005 | Socorro | LINEAR | · | 840 m | MPC; JPL |
| 236162 | 2005 UE_{427} | — | October 28, 2005 | Kitt Peak | Spacewatch | · | 760 m | MPC; JPL |
| 236163 | 2005 UW_{432} | — | October 28, 2005 | Mount Lemmon | Mount Lemmon Survey | · | 660 m | MPC; JPL |
| 236164 | 2005 UU_{445} | — | October 31, 2005 | Mount Lemmon | Mount Lemmon Survey | · | 1.1 km | MPC; JPL |
| 236165 | 2005 UR_{453} | — | October 29, 2005 | Mount Lemmon | Mount Lemmon Survey | V | 870 m | MPC; JPL |
| 236166 | 2005 UN_{454} | — | October 26, 2005 | Anderson Mesa | LONEOS | · | 1.7 km | MPC; JPL |
| 236167 | 2005 US_{459} | — | October 27, 2005 | Mount Lemmon | Mount Lemmon Survey | · | 1.2 km | MPC; JPL |
| 236168 | 2005 UF_{461} | — | October 28, 2005 | Mount Lemmon | Mount Lemmon Survey | · | 1.0 km | MPC; JPL |
| 236169 | 2005 UD_{473} | — | October 30, 2005 | Mount Lemmon | Mount Lemmon Survey | · | 970 m | MPC; JPL |
| 236170 Cholnoky | 2005 VP_{7} | Cholnoky | November 9, 2005 | Piszkéstető | K. Sárneczky | · | 970 m | MPC; JPL |
| 236171 | 2005 VK_{14} | — | November 3, 2005 | Socorro | LINEAR | · | 730 m | MPC; JPL |
| 236172 | 2005 VY_{29} | — | November 4, 2005 | Kitt Peak | Spacewatch | · | 2.2 km | MPC; JPL |
| 236173 | 2005 VU_{32} | — | November 4, 2005 | Kitt Peak | Spacewatch | · | 1.4 km | MPC; JPL |
| 236174 | 2005 VV_{32} | — | November 4, 2005 | Kitt Peak | Spacewatch | · | 1.3 km | MPC; JPL |
| 236175 | 2005 VD_{37} | — | November 3, 2005 | Catalina | CSS | (2076) | 930 m | MPC; JPL |
| 236176 | 2005 VP_{38} | — | November 3, 2005 | Mount Lemmon | Mount Lemmon Survey | · | 1.1 km | MPC; JPL |
| 236177 | 2005 VS_{56} | — | November 4, 2005 | Mount Lemmon | Mount Lemmon Survey | slow | 1.2 km | MPC; JPL |
| 236178 | 2005 VS_{60} | — | November 5, 2005 | Kitt Peak | Spacewatch | · | 840 m | MPC; JPL |
| 236179 | 2005 VN_{78} | — | November 6, 2005 | Anderson Mesa | LONEOS | · | 770 m | MPC; JPL |
| 236180 | 2005 VT_{80} | — | November 5, 2005 | Socorro | LINEAR | · | 1.1 km | MPC; JPL |
| 236181 | 2005 VP_{81} | — | November 5, 2005 | Kitt Peak | Spacewatch | MAS | 690 m | MPC; JPL |
| 236182 | 2005 VB_{116} | — | November 11, 2005 | Kitt Peak | Spacewatch | · | 1.1 km | MPC; JPL |
| 236183 | 2005 VC_{119} | — | November 4, 2005 | Kitt Peak | Spacewatch | · | 840 m | MPC; JPL |
| 236184 | 2005 WX_{3} | — | November 23, 2005 | Socorro | LINEAR | · | 1.5 km | MPC; JPL |
| 236185 | 2005 WV_{4} | — | November 17, 2005 | Palomar | NEAT | · | 1.3 km | MPC; JPL |
| 236186 | 2005 WN_{15} | — | November 22, 2005 | Kitt Peak | Spacewatch | · | 1.3 km | MPC; JPL |
| 236187 | 2005 WG_{18} | — | November 22, 2005 | Kitt Peak | Spacewatch | · | 1.0 km | MPC; JPL |
| 236188 | 2005 WD_{33} | — | November 21, 2005 | Catalina | CSS | NYS | 990 m | MPC; JPL |
| 236189 | 2005 WK_{36} | — | November 22, 2005 | Kitt Peak | Spacewatch | · | 920 m | MPC; JPL |
| 236190 | 2005 WT_{38} | — | November 22, 2005 | Kitt Peak | Spacewatch | · | 920 m | MPC; JPL |
| 236191 | 2005 WM_{40} | — | November 25, 2005 | Mount Lemmon | Mount Lemmon Survey | NYS | 1.1 km | MPC; JPL |
| 236192 | 2005 WD_{43} | — | November 21, 2005 | Kitt Peak | Spacewatch | · | 1.5 km | MPC; JPL |
| 236193 | 2005 WC_{47} | — | November 25, 2005 | Kitt Peak | Spacewatch | · | 900 m | MPC; JPL |
| 236194 | 2005 WD_{57} | — | November 20, 2005 | Gnosca | S. Sposetti | · | 910 m | MPC; JPL |
| 236195 | 2005 WX_{58} | — | November 30, 2005 | Kitt Peak | Spacewatch | · | 1.2 km | MPC; JPL |
| 236196 | 2005 WY_{58} | — | November 30, 2005 | Socorro | LINEAR | · | 1.2 km | MPC; JPL |
| 236197 | 2005 WM_{71} | — | November 21, 2005 | Kitt Peak | Spacewatch | · | 1.5 km | MPC; JPL |
| 236198 | 2005 WY_{78} | — | November 25, 2005 | Kitt Peak | Spacewatch | · | 1.7 km | MPC; JPL |
| 236199 | 2005 WJ_{79} | — | November 25, 2005 | Kitt Peak | Spacewatch | · | 800 m | MPC; JPL |
| 236200 | 2005 WA_{80} | — | November 25, 2005 | Kitt Peak | Spacewatch | · | 1.2 km | MPC; JPL |

== 236201–236300 ==
back to top

| Designation | | | Discovery | | | Properties | | Ref |
| Permanent | Provisional | Named after | Date | Site | Discoverer(s) | Category | Diam. | Ref |
|---|---|---|---|---|---|---|---|---|
| 236201 | 2005 WF_{81} | — | November 26, 2005 | Mount Lemmon | Mount Lemmon Survey | · | 1.6 km | MPC; JPL |
| 236202 | 2005 WK_{91} | — | November 28, 2005 | Catalina | CSS | · | 1.1 km | MPC; JPL |
| 236203 | 2005 WU_{101} | — | November 29, 2005 | Socorro | LINEAR | · | 1.1 km | MPC; JPL |
| 236204 | 2005 WL_{104} | — | November 28, 2005 | Catalina | CSS | · | 1.3 km | MPC; JPL |
| 236205 | 2005 WJ_{106} | — | November 25, 2005 | Kitt Peak | Spacewatch | · | 1.0 km | MPC; JPL |
| 236206 | 2005 WB_{118} | — | November 28, 2005 | Catalina | CSS | · | 1.2 km | MPC; JPL |
| 236207 | 2005 WJ_{119} | — | November 28, 2005 | Socorro | LINEAR | · | 1.3 km | MPC; JPL |
| 236208 | 2005 WS_{121} | — | November 30, 2005 | Socorro | LINEAR | · | 3.3 km | MPC; JPL |
| 236209 | 2005 WT_{122} | — | November 25, 2005 | Mount Lemmon | Mount Lemmon Survey | HIL · 3:2 | 6.2 km | MPC; JPL |
| 236210 | 2005 WC_{144} | — | November 30, 2005 | Kitt Peak | Spacewatch | MAS | 920 m | MPC; JPL |
| 236211 | 2005 WZ_{150} | — | November 28, 2005 | Socorro | LINEAR | · | 2.2 km | MPC; JPL |
| 236212 | 2005 WW_{156} | — | November 30, 2005 | Socorro | LINEAR | NYS | 1.5 km | MPC; JPL |
| 236213 | 2005 WW_{157} | — | November 25, 2005 | Mount Lemmon | Mount Lemmon Survey | · | 1.6 km | MPC; JPL |
| 236214 | 2005 WZ_{157} | — | November 26, 2005 | Socorro | LINEAR | · | 3.0 km | MPC; JPL |
| 236215 | 2005 WQ_{166} | — | November 29, 2005 | Mount Lemmon | Mount Lemmon Survey | · | 620 m | MPC; JPL |
| 236216 | 2005 WQ_{171} | — | November 30, 2005 | Kitt Peak | Spacewatch | · | 940 m | MPC; JPL |
| 236217 | 2005 WB_{176} | — | November 30, 2005 | Kitt Peak | Spacewatch | · | 1.2 km | MPC; JPL |
| 236218 | 2005 WT_{176} | — | November 30, 2005 | Kitt Peak | Spacewatch | NYS | 1.3 km | MPC; JPL |
| 236219 | 2005 WX_{183} | — | November 28, 2005 | Socorro | LINEAR | · | 1.1 km | MPC; JPL |
| 236220 | 2005 WJ_{184} | — | November 28, 2005 | Socorro | LINEAR | · | 1.9 km | MPC; JPL |
| 236221 | 2005 WP_{188} | — | November 30, 2005 | Kitt Peak | Spacewatch | EOS | 3.9 km | MPC; JPL |
| 236222 | 2005 WT_{193} | — | November 28, 2005 | Socorro | LINEAR | · | 1.0 km | MPC; JPL |
| 236223 | 2005 WA_{202} | — | November 29, 2005 | Kitt Peak | Spacewatch | NYS | 1.4 km | MPC; JPL |
| 236224 | 2005 XE_{2} | — | December 1, 2005 | Socorro | LINEAR | · | 840 m | MPC; JPL |
| 236225 | 2005 XE_{29} | — | December 2, 2005 | Socorro | LINEAR | · | 2.4 km | MPC; JPL |
| 236226 | 2005 XL_{55} | — | December 5, 2005 | Catalina | CSS | · | 1.0 km | MPC; JPL |
| 236227 | 2005 XP_{61} | — | December 4, 2005 | Kitt Peak | Spacewatch | · | 780 m | MPC; JPL |
| 236228 | 2005 XK_{67} | — | December 5, 2005 | Mount Lemmon | Mount Lemmon Survey | · | 1.0 km | MPC; JPL |
| 236229 | 2005 XC_{69} | — | December 6, 2005 | Kitt Peak | Spacewatch | · | 760 m | MPC; JPL |
| 236230 | 2005 XM_{75} | — | December 6, 2005 | Kitt Peak | Spacewatch | · | 970 m | MPC; JPL |
| 236231 | 2005 XX_{79} | — | December 6, 2005 | Kitt Peak | Spacewatch | · | 1.5 km | MPC; JPL |
| 236232 Joshalbers | 2005 XD_{112} | Joshalbers | December 2, 2005 | Kitt Peak | M. W. Buie | MAS | 740 m | MPC; JPL |
| 236233 | 2005 YT_{4} | — | December 21, 2005 | Kitt Peak | Spacewatch | · | 810 m | MPC; JPL |
| 236234 | 2005 YJ_{18} | — | December 23, 2005 | Kitt Peak | Spacewatch | · | 900 m | MPC; JPL |
| 236235 | 2005 YT_{28} | — | December 22, 2005 | Kitt Peak | Spacewatch | · | 3.3 km | MPC; JPL |
| 236236 | 2005 YB_{37} | — | December 26, 2005 | 7300 | W. K. Y. Yeung | · | 940 m | MPC; JPL |
| 236237 | 2005 YJ_{42} | — | December 24, 2005 | Kitt Peak | Spacewatch | · | 1.2 km | MPC; JPL |
| 236238 | 2005 YU_{47} | — | December 26, 2005 | Catalina | CSS | · | 2.0 km | MPC; JPL |
| 236239 | 2005 YF_{49} | — | December 22, 2005 | Kitt Peak | Spacewatch | · | 1.1 km | MPC; JPL |
| 236240 | 2005 YX_{51} | — | December 26, 2005 | Mount Lemmon | Mount Lemmon Survey | · | 1.2 km | MPC; JPL |
| 236241 | 2005 YA_{52} | — | December 26, 2005 | Mount Lemmon | Mount Lemmon Survey | · | 3.8 km | MPC; JPL |
| 236242 | 2005 YH_{66} | — | December 25, 2005 | Kitt Peak | Spacewatch | · | 1.0 km | MPC; JPL |
| 236243 | 2005 YQ_{76} | — | December 24, 2005 | Kitt Peak | Spacewatch | NYS | 1.4 km | MPC; JPL |
| 236244 | 2005 YL_{89} | — | December 26, 2005 | Mount Lemmon | Mount Lemmon Survey | MAS | 1.0 km | MPC; JPL |
| 236245 | 2005 YD_{90} | — | December 26, 2005 | Mount Lemmon | Mount Lemmon Survey | · | 1.9 km | MPC; JPL |
| 236246 | 2005 YE_{91} | — | December 26, 2005 | Mount Lemmon | Mount Lemmon Survey | · | 3.9 km | MPC; JPL |
| 236247 | 2005 YH_{91} | — | December 26, 2005 | Mount Lemmon | Mount Lemmon Survey | · | 1.2 km | MPC; JPL |
| 236248 | 2005 YT_{92} | — | December 27, 2005 | Mount Lemmon | Mount Lemmon Survey | · | 980 m | MPC; JPL |
| 236249 | 2005 YS_{97} | — | December 24, 2005 | Kitt Peak | Spacewatch | NYS | 1.6 km | MPC; JPL |
| 236250 | 2005 YB_{113} | — | December 25, 2005 | Mount Lemmon | Mount Lemmon Survey | NYS | 1.2 km | MPC; JPL |
| 236251 | 2005 YM_{113} | — | December 25, 2005 | Kitt Peak | Spacewatch | · | 2.5 km | MPC; JPL |
| 236252 | 2005 YR_{119} | — | December 27, 2005 | Kitt Peak | Spacewatch | · | 2.5 km | MPC; JPL |
| 236253 | 2005 YQ_{125} | — | December 26, 2005 | Kitt Peak | Spacewatch | · | 1.7 km | MPC; JPL |
| 236254 | 2005 YS_{135} | — | December 26, 2005 | Kitt Peak | Spacewatch | · | 1.8 km | MPC; JPL |
| 236255 | 2005 YO_{141} | — | December 28, 2005 | Mount Lemmon | Mount Lemmon Survey | V | 920 m | MPC; JPL |
| 236256 | 2005 YX_{141} | — | December 28, 2005 | Mount Lemmon | Mount Lemmon Survey | · | 1.3 km | MPC; JPL |
| 236257 | 2005 YK_{143} | — | December 28, 2005 | Mount Lemmon | Mount Lemmon Survey | NYS | 1.3 km | MPC; JPL |
| 236258 | 2005 YX_{143} | — | December 28, 2005 | Mount Lemmon | Mount Lemmon Survey | · | 1.7 km | MPC; JPL |
| 236259 | 2005 YF_{144} | — | December 28, 2005 | Mount Lemmon | Mount Lemmon Survey | · | 1.5 km | MPC; JPL |
| 236260 | 2005 YC_{150} | — | December 25, 2005 | Kitt Peak | Spacewatch | · | 1.6 km | MPC; JPL |
| 236261 | 2005 YD_{153} | — | December 28, 2005 | Mount Lemmon | Mount Lemmon Survey | · | 1.8 km | MPC; JPL |
| 236262 | 2005 YQ_{153} | — | December 29, 2005 | Socorro | LINEAR | · | 810 m | MPC; JPL |
| 236263 | 2005 YV_{153} | — | December 29, 2005 | Socorro | LINEAR | NYS | 2.1 km | MPC; JPL |
| 236264 | 2005 YX_{163} | — | December 28, 2005 | Kitt Peak | Spacewatch | · | 2.4 km | MPC; JPL |
| 236265 | 2005 YR_{164} | — | December 29, 2005 | Kitt Peak | Spacewatch | · | 1.4 km | MPC; JPL |
| 236266 | 2005 YS_{181} | — | December 24, 2005 | Socorro | LINEAR | PHO | 1.8 km | MPC; JPL |
| 236267 | 2005 YC_{182} | — | December 29, 2005 | Socorro | LINEAR | · | 1.2 km | MPC; JPL |
| 236268 | 2005 YJ_{184} | — | December 27, 2005 | Kitt Peak | Spacewatch | · | 1.6 km | MPC; JPL |
| 236269 | 2005 YN_{191} | — | December 30, 2005 | Kitt Peak | Spacewatch | · | 2.0 km | MPC; JPL |
| 236270 | 2005 YZ_{192} | — | December 30, 2005 | Kitt Peak | Spacewatch | · | 2.0 km | MPC; JPL |
| 236271 | 2005 YK_{193} | — | December 30, 2005 | Kitt Peak | Spacewatch | NYS | 1.3 km | MPC; JPL |
| 236272 | 2005 YL_{196} | — | December 24, 2005 | Kitt Peak | Spacewatch | NYS | 1.1 km | MPC; JPL |
| 236273 | 2005 YB_{204} | — | December 25, 2005 | Mount Lemmon | Mount Lemmon Survey | NYS | 1.7 km | MPC; JPL |
| 236274 | 2005 YB_{225} | — | December 25, 2005 | Kitt Peak | Spacewatch | NYS | 1.9 km | MPC; JPL |
| 236275 | 2005 YG_{241} | — | December 29, 2005 | Kitt Peak | Spacewatch | MAS | 810 m | MPC; JPL |
| 236276 | 2005 YU_{243} | — | December 30, 2005 | Kitt Peak | Spacewatch | · | 1.3 km | MPC; JPL |
| 236277 | 2005 YS_{247} | — | December 30, 2005 | Kitt Peak | Spacewatch | NYS · | 2.1 km | MPC; JPL |
| 236278 | 2005 YE_{251} | — | December 28, 2005 | Kitt Peak | Spacewatch | · | 1.5 km | MPC; JPL |
| 236279 | 2005 YM_{268} | — | December 25, 2005 | Mount Lemmon | Mount Lemmon Survey | V | 1.1 km | MPC; JPL |
| 236280 | 2005 YH_{291} | — | December 26, 2005 | Mount Lemmon | Mount Lemmon Survey | · | 1.7 km | MPC; JPL |
| 236281 | 2006 AH_{1} | — | January 2, 2006 | Mount Lemmon | Mount Lemmon Survey | · | 1.6 km | MPC; JPL |
| 236282 | 2006 AF_{11} | — | January 4, 2006 | Mount Lemmon | Mount Lemmon Survey | MAS | 820 m | MPC; JPL |
| 236283 | 2006 AL_{11} | — | January 4, 2006 | Catalina | CSS | · | 1.8 km | MPC; JPL |
| 236284 | 2006 AV_{12} | — | January 5, 2006 | Catalina | CSS | · | 1.6 km | MPC; JPL |
| 236285 | 2006 AF_{14} | — | January 5, 2006 | Mount Lemmon | Mount Lemmon Survey | · | 1.7 km | MPC; JPL |
| 236286 | 2006 AY_{37} | — | January 4, 2006 | Kitt Peak | Spacewatch | · | 1.4 km | MPC; JPL |
| 236287 | 2006 AD_{38} | — | January 6, 2006 | Mount Lemmon | Mount Lemmon Survey | MAS | 1.0 km | MPC; JPL |
| 236288 | 2006 AQ_{43} | — | January 7, 2006 | Kitt Peak | Spacewatch | NYS | 1.2 km | MPC; JPL |
| 236289 | 2006 AW_{52} | — | January 5, 2006 | Kitt Peak | Spacewatch | · | 2.1 km | MPC; JPL |
| 236290 | 2006 AP_{55} | — | January 5, 2006 | Kitt Peak | Spacewatch | · | 1.4 km | MPC; JPL |
| 236291 | 2006 AC_{56} | — | January 6, 2006 | Mount Lemmon | Mount Lemmon Survey | · | 3.2 km | MPC; JPL |
| 236292 | 2006 AD_{57} | — | January 8, 2006 | Anderson Mesa | LONEOS | · | 2.0 km | MPC; JPL |
| 236293 | 2006 AF_{57} | — | January 8, 2006 | Kitt Peak | Spacewatch | MAS | 780 m | MPC; JPL |
| 236294 | 2006 AS_{63} | — | January 6, 2006 | Mount Lemmon | Mount Lemmon Survey | MAS | 1.0 km | MPC; JPL |
| 236295 | 2006 AE_{66} | — | January 8, 2006 | Mount Lemmon | Mount Lemmon Survey | · | 1.7 km | MPC; JPL |
| 236296 | 2006 AU_{71} | — | January 6, 2006 | Kitt Peak | Spacewatch | · | 1.3 km | MPC; JPL |
| 236297 | 2006 AR_{73} | — | January 8, 2006 | Mount Lemmon | Mount Lemmon Survey | PHO | 1.6 km | MPC; JPL |
| 236298 | 2006 AK_{74} | — | January 5, 2006 | Anderson Mesa | LONEOS | · | 1.6 km | MPC; JPL |
| 236299 | 2006 AC_{78} | — | January 8, 2006 | Mount Lemmon | Mount Lemmon Survey | NYS | 1.5 km | MPC; JPL |
| 236300 | 2006 AH_{91} | — | January 7, 2006 | Kitt Peak | Spacewatch | NYS | 1.3 km | MPC; JPL |

== 236301–236400 ==
back to top

| Designation | | | Discovery | | | Properties | | Ref |
| Permanent | Provisional | Named after | Date | Site | Discoverer(s) | Category | Diam. | Ref |
|---|---|---|---|---|---|---|---|---|
| 236301 | 2006 AA_{96} | — | January 10, 2006 | Kitt Peak | Spacewatch | · | 1.2 km | MPC; JPL |
| 236302 | 2006 AA_{98} | — | January 4, 2006 | Kitt Peak | Spacewatch | · | 4.6 km | MPC; JPL |
| 236303 | 2006 AT_{100} | — | January 6, 2006 | Kitt Peak | Spacewatch | · | 1.0 km | MPC; JPL |
| 236304 | 2006 AJ_{106} | — | January 10, 2006 | Mount Lemmon | Mount Lemmon Survey | · | 1.5 km | MPC; JPL |
| 236305 Adamriess | 2006 BU | Adamriess | January 19, 2006 | Vallemare Borbona | V. S. Casulli | · | 1.4 km | MPC; JPL |
| 236306 | 2006 BM_{1} | — | January 20, 2006 | Kitt Peak | Spacewatch | · | 1.2 km | MPC; JPL |
| 236307 Berzsenyi | 2006 BF_{9} | Berzsenyi | January 24, 2006 | Piszkéstető | K. Sárneczky | NYS | 1.4 km | MPC; JPL |
| 236308 | 2006 BH_{9} | — | January 18, 2006 | Catalina | CSS | · | 1.6 km | MPC; JPL |
| 236309 | 2006 BL_{9} | — | January 21, 2006 | Anderson Mesa | LONEOS | · | 1.3 km | MPC; JPL |
| 236310 | 2006 BU_{20} | — | January 22, 2006 | Mount Lemmon | Mount Lemmon Survey | MAS | 730 m | MPC; JPL |
| 236311 | 2006 BX_{21} | — | January 22, 2006 | Mount Lemmon | Mount Lemmon Survey | MAS | 790 m | MPC; JPL |
| 236312 | 2006 BV_{22} | — | January 22, 2006 | Mount Lemmon | Mount Lemmon Survey | NYS · | 2.8 km | MPC; JPL |
| 236313 | 2006 BA_{24} | — | January 23, 2006 | Socorro | LINEAR | · | 1.9 km | MPC; JPL |
| 236314 | 2006 BA_{32} | — | January 20, 2006 | Kitt Peak | Spacewatch | · | 2.9 km | MPC; JPL |
| 236315 | 2006 BJ_{34} | — | January 21, 2006 | Kitt Peak | Spacewatch | NYS | 1.9 km | MPC; JPL |
| 236316 | 2006 BO_{38} | — | January 23, 2006 | Mount Lemmon | Mount Lemmon Survey | · | 1.2 km | MPC; JPL |
| 236317 | 2006 BR_{45} | — | January 23, 2006 | Mount Lemmon | Mount Lemmon Survey | · | 1.4 km | MPC; JPL |
| 236318 | 2006 BF_{47} | — | January 24, 2006 | Socorro | LINEAR | MAS | 1.6 km | MPC; JPL |
| 236319 | 2006 BL_{54} | — | January 25, 2006 | Kitt Peak | Spacewatch | · | 1.7 km | MPC; JPL |
| 236320 | 2006 BO_{56} | — | January 22, 2006 | Mount Lemmon | Mount Lemmon Survey | · | 3.5 km | MPC; JPL |
| 236321 | 2006 BR_{61} | — | January 22, 2006 | Catalina | CSS | PHO | 1.8 km | MPC; JPL |
| 236322 | 2006 BS_{71} | — | January 23, 2006 | Kitt Peak | Spacewatch | · | 1.8 km | MPC; JPL |
| 236323 | 2006 BF_{81} | — | January 23, 2006 | Kitt Peak | Spacewatch | EUN | 1.2 km | MPC; JPL |
| 236324 | 2006 BK_{81} | — | January 23, 2006 | Kitt Peak | Spacewatch | · | 1.9 km | MPC; JPL |
| 236325 | 2006 BK_{82} | — | January 23, 2006 | Mount Lemmon | Mount Lemmon Survey | · | 1.7 km | MPC; JPL |
| 236326 | 2006 BR_{82} | — | January 24, 2006 | Kitt Peak | Spacewatch | · | 970 m | MPC; JPL |
| 236327 | 2006 BG_{84} | — | January 25, 2006 | Kitt Peak | Spacewatch | MAS | 820 m | MPC; JPL |
| 236328 | 2006 BW_{87} | — | January 25, 2006 | Kitt Peak | Spacewatch | NYS | 1.8 km | MPC; JPL |
| 236329 | 2006 BD_{90} | — | January 25, 2006 | Kitt Peak | Spacewatch | · | 2.7 km | MPC; JPL |
| 236330 | 2006 BA_{92} | — | January 26, 2006 | Mount Lemmon | Mount Lemmon Survey | NYS | 1.8 km | MPC; JPL |
| 236331 | 2006 BF_{93} | — | January 26, 2006 | Kitt Peak | Spacewatch | · | 1.8 km | MPC; JPL |
| 236332 | 2006 BT_{93} | — | January 26, 2006 | Kitt Peak | Spacewatch | · | 1.5 km | MPC; JPL |
| 236333 | 2006 BF_{95} | — | January 26, 2006 | Kitt Peak | Spacewatch | NYS | 1.8 km | MPC; JPL |
| 236334 | 2006 BE_{102} | — | January 23, 2006 | Mount Lemmon | Mount Lemmon Survey | · | 1.2 km | MPC; JPL |
| 236335 | 2006 BZ_{111} | — | January 25, 2006 | Kitt Peak | Spacewatch | · | 1.7 km | MPC; JPL |
| 236336 | 2006 BA_{117} | — | January 26, 2006 | Kitt Peak | Spacewatch | HOF | 2.8 km | MPC; JPL |
| 236337 | 2006 BF_{117} | — | January 26, 2006 | Kitt Peak | Spacewatch | · | 1.7 km | MPC; JPL |
| 236338 | 2006 BF_{119} | — | January 26, 2006 | Kitt Peak | Spacewatch | · | 1.5 km | MPC; JPL |
| 236339 | 2006 BV_{125} | — | January 26, 2006 | Kitt Peak | Spacewatch | · | 1.3 km | MPC; JPL |
| 236340 | 2006 BW_{125} | — | January 26, 2006 | Catalina | CSS | NYS | 1.3 km | MPC; JPL |
| 236341 | 2006 BG_{126} | — | January 26, 2006 | Kitt Peak | Spacewatch | NYS | 1.4 km | MPC; JPL |
| 236342 | 2006 BQ_{127} | — | January 26, 2006 | Kitt Peak | Spacewatch | · | 1.2 km | MPC; JPL |
| 236343 | 2006 BV_{131} | — | January 26, 2006 | Kitt Peak | Spacewatch | RAF | 1.2 km | MPC; JPL |
| 236344 | 2006 BM_{132} | — | January 26, 2006 | Kitt Peak | Spacewatch | · | 1.4 km | MPC; JPL |
| 236345 | 2006 BR_{135} | — | January 27, 2006 | Mount Lemmon | Mount Lemmon Survey | · | 3.6 km | MPC; JPL |
| 236346 | 2006 BT_{138} | — | January 28, 2006 | Mount Lemmon | Mount Lemmon Survey | · | 1.6 km | MPC; JPL |
| 236347 | 2006 BX_{140} | — | January 23, 2006 | Kitt Peak | Spacewatch | PHO | 1.7 km | MPC; JPL |
| 236348 | 2006 BA_{154} | — | January 25, 2006 | Anderson Mesa | LONEOS | · | 1.6 km | MPC; JPL |
| 236349 | 2006 BC_{156} | — | January 25, 2006 | Kitt Peak | Spacewatch | HOF | 4.2 km | MPC; JPL |
| 236350 | 2006 BP_{156} | — | January 25, 2006 | Kitt Peak | Spacewatch | · | 1.4 km | MPC; JPL |
| 236351 | 2006 BB_{157} | — | January 25, 2006 | Kitt Peak | Spacewatch | · | 1.3 km | MPC; JPL |
| 236352 | 2006 BE_{157} | — | January 25, 2006 | Kitt Peak | Spacewatch | · | 3.7 km | MPC; JPL |
| 236353 | 2006 BB_{162} | — | January 26, 2006 | Catalina | CSS | · | 2.8 km | MPC; JPL |
| 236354 | 2006 BJ_{166} | — | January 26, 2006 | Mount Lemmon | Mount Lemmon Survey | · | 3.0 km | MPC; JPL |
| 236355 | 2006 BY_{166} | — | January 26, 2006 | Mount Lemmon | Mount Lemmon Survey | · | 1.8 km | MPC; JPL |
| 236356 | 2006 BE_{179} | — | January 27, 2006 | Mount Lemmon | Mount Lemmon Survey | · | 2.0 km | MPC; JPL |
| 236357 | 2006 BH_{184} | — | January 28, 2006 | Mount Lemmon | Mount Lemmon Survey | · | 1.7 km | MPC; JPL |
| 236358 | 2006 BV_{189} | — | January 28, 2006 | Kitt Peak | Spacewatch | NYS | 1.5 km | MPC; JPL |
| 236359 | 2006 BE_{194} | — | January 30, 2006 | Kitt Peak | Spacewatch | · | 1.7 km | MPC; JPL |
| 236360 | 2006 BM_{197} | — | January 30, 2006 | Kitt Peak | Spacewatch | · | 1.9 km | MPC; JPL |
| 236361 | 2006 BR_{197} | — | January 30, 2006 | Kitt Peak | Spacewatch | · | 1.8 km | MPC; JPL |
| 236362 | 2006 BG_{209} | — | January 31, 2006 | Mount Lemmon | Mount Lemmon Survey | MAS | 880 m | MPC; JPL |
| 236363 | 2006 BK_{219} | — | January 28, 2006 | Mount Lemmon | Mount Lemmon Survey | · | 1.8 km | MPC; JPL |
| 236364 | 2006 BK_{220} | — | January 30, 2006 | Kitt Peak | Spacewatch | · | 3.8 km | MPC; JPL |
| 236365 | 2006 BM_{237} | — | January 31, 2006 | Kitt Peak | Spacewatch | NYS | 1.3 km | MPC; JPL |
| 236366 | 2006 BL_{250} | — | January 31, 2006 | Kitt Peak | Spacewatch | MAS | 1.0 km | MPC; JPL |
| 236367 | 2006 BM_{255} | — | January 31, 2006 | Kitt Peak | Spacewatch | NYS | 1.3 km | MPC; JPL |
| 236368 | 2006 BY_{256} | — | January 31, 2006 | Kitt Peak | Spacewatch | · | 1.5 km | MPC; JPL |
| 236369 | 2006 BT_{267} | — | January 26, 2006 | Catalina | CSS | · | 1.6 km | MPC; JPL |
| 236370 | 2006 BE_{275} | — | January 26, 2006 | Mount Lemmon | Mount Lemmon Survey | HNS | 1.6 km | MPC; JPL |
| 236371 | 2006 BD_{277} | — | January 30, 2006 | Kitt Peak | Spacewatch | · | 1.1 km | MPC; JPL |
| 236372 | 2006 BW_{278} | — | January 26, 2006 | Kitt Peak | Spacewatch | · | 4.1 km | MPC; JPL |
| 236373 | 2006 BY_{280} | — | January 23, 2006 | Kitt Peak | Spacewatch | · | 1.9 km | MPC; JPL |
| 236374 | 2006 CO_{1} | — | February 1, 2006 | Kitt Peak | Spacewatch | · | 1.8 km | MPC; JPL |
| 236375 | 2006 CT_{6} | — | February 1, 2006 | Mount Lemmon | Mount Lemmon Survey | · | 1.8 km | MPC; JPL |
| 236376 | 2006 CB_{16} | — | February 1, 2006 | Kitt Peak | Spacewatch | NYS | 1.4 km | MPC; JPL |
| 236377 | 2006 CR_{18} | — | February 1, 2006 | Mount Lemmon | Mount Lemmon Survey | · | 1.8 km | MPC; JPL |
| 236378 | 2006 CD_{23} | — | February 1, 2006 | Kitt Peak | Spacewatch | · | 2.1 km | MPC; JPL |
| 236379 | 2006 CL_{29} | — | February 2, 2006 | Kitt Peak | Spacewatch | · | 2.8 km | MPC; JPL |
| 236380 | 2006 CJ_{62} | — | February 6, 2006 | Catalina | CSS | · | 3.5 km | MPC; JPL |
| 236381 | 2006 CR_{65} | — | February 6, 2006 | Mount Lemmon | Mount Lemmon Survey | · | 1.8 km | MPC; JPL |
| 236382 | 2006 CZ_{65} | — | February 6, 2006 | Kitt Peak | Spacewatch | · | 2.7 km | MPC; JPL |
| 236383 | 2006 DH_{5} | — | February 20, 2006 | Catalina | CSS | · | 1.4 km | MPC; JPL |
| 236384 | 2006 DH_{14} | — | February 22, 2006 | Catalina | CSS | · | 3.1 km | MPC; JPL |
| 236385 | 2006 DO_{14} | — | February 23, 2006 | Powell | Trentman, R. | · | 3.4 km | MPC; JPL |
| 236386 | 2006 DF_{16} | — | February 20, 2006 | Kitt Peak | Spacewatch | · | 1.8 km | MPC; JPL |
| 236387 | 2006 DV_{20} | — | February 20, 2006 | Catalina | CSS | EUN | 1.5 km | MPC; JPL |
| 236388 | 2006 DK_{27} | — | February 20, 2006 | Kitt Peak | Spacewatch | · | 1.2 km | MPC; JPL |
| 236389 | 2006 DZ_{29} | — | February 20, 2006 | Kitt Peak | Spacewatch | · | 2.1 km | MPC; JPL |
| 236390 | 2006 DA_{32} | — | February 20, 2006 | Mount Lemmon | Mount Lemmon Survey | · | 1.8 km | MPC; JPL |
| 236391 | 2006 DK_{35} | — | February 20, 2006 | Mount Lemmon | Mount Lemmon Survey | MAS | 900 m | MPC; JPL |
| 236392 | 2006 DP_{36} | — | February 20, 2006 | Mount Lemmon | Mount Lemmon Survey | BRA | 2.4 km | MPC; JPL |
| 236393 | 2006 DH_{37} | — | February 20, 2006 | Kitt Peak | Spacewatch | · | 2.6 km | MPC; JPL |
| 236394 | 2006 DE_{38} | — | February 21, 2006 | Anderson Mesa | LONEOS | · | 1.7 km | MPC; JPL |
| 236395 | 2006 DE_{39} | — | February 21, 2006 | Mount Lemmon | Mount Lemmon Survey | · | 2.4 km | MPC; JPL |
| 236396 | 2006 DV_{43} | — | February 20, 2006 | Kitt Peak | Spacewatch | · | 2.4 km | MPC; JPL |
| 236397 | 2006 DD_{52} | — | February 24, 2006 | Catalina | CSS | · | 2.9 km | MPC; JPL |
| 236398 | 2006 DZ_{58} | — | February 24, 2006 | Kitt Peak | Spacewatch | · | 1.3 km | MPC; JPL |
| 236399 | 2006 DM_{59} | — | February 24, 2006 | Mount Lemmon | Mount Lemmon Survey | · | 1.8 km | MPC; JPL |
| 236400 | 2006 DH_{60} | — | February 24, 2006 | Kitt Peak | Spacewatch | · | 1.8 km | MPC; JPL |

== 236401–236500 ==
back to top

| Designation | | | Discovery | | | Properties | | Ref |
| Permanent | Provisional | Named after | Date | Site | Discoverer(s) | Category | Diam. | Ref |
|---|---|---|---|---|---|---|---|---|
| 236401 | 2006 DW_{61} | — | February 21, 2006 | Catalina | CSS | · | 1.9 km | MPC; JPL |
| 236402 | 2006 DY_{61} | — | February 22, 2006 | Anderson Mesa | LONEOS | · | 4.8 km | MPC; JPL |
| 236403 | 2006 DS_{64} | — | February 20, 2006 | Catalina | CSS | NAE | 4.3 km | MPC; JPL |
| 236404 | 2006 DU_{64} | — | February 20, 2006 | Catalina | CSS | · | 1.3 km | MPC; JPL |
| 236405 | 2006 DF_{68} | — | February 22, 2006 | Socorro | LINEAR | · | 1.9 km | MPC; JPL |
| 236406 | 2006 DH_{73} | — | February 22, 2006 | Mount Lemmon | Mount Lemmon Survey | · | 4.7 km | MPC; JPL |
| 236407 | 2006 DC_{74} | — | February 23, 2006 | Kitt Peak | Spacewatch | · | 2.6 km | MPC; JPL |
| 236408 | 2006 DH_{74} | — | February 23, 2006 | Anderson Mesa | LONEOS | WAT | 3.0 km | MPC; JPL |
| 236409 | 2006 DC_{80} | — | February 24, 2006 | Kitt Peak | Spacewatch | · | 1.7 km | MPC; JPL |
| 236410 | 2006 DG_{80} | — | February 24, 2006 | Kitt Peak | Spacewatch | · | 1.6 km | MPC; JPL |
| 236411 | 2006 DU_{80} | — | February 24, 2006 | Kitt Peak | Spacewatch | · | 1.7 km | MPC; JPL |
| 236412 | 2006 DN_{84} | — | February 24, 2006 | Kitt Peak | Spacewatch | EUN | 1.5 km | MPC; JPL |
| 236413 | 2006 DC_{85} | — | February 24, 2006 | Kitt Peak | Spacewatch | · | 1.8 km | MPC; JPL |
| 236414 | 2006 DG_{90} | — | February 24, 2006 | Kitt Peak | Spacewatch | NYS | 1.5 km | MPC; JPL |
| 236415 | 2006 DP_{91} | — | February 24, 2006 | Kitt Peak | Spacewatch | · | 1.3 km | MPC; JPL |
| 236416 | 2006 DO_{92} | — | February 24, 2006 | Kitt Peak | Spacewatch | · | 1.5 km | MPC; JPL |
| 236417 | 2006 DA_{93} | — | February 24, 2006 | Kitt Peak | Spacewatch | · | 2.1 km | MPC; JPL |
| 236418 | 2006 DR_{93} | — | February 24, 2006 | Kitt Peak | Spacewatch | · | 1.7 km | MPC; JPL |
| 236419 | 2006 DH_{94} | — | February 24, 2006 | Kitt Peak | Spacewatch | · | 1.1 km | MPC; JPL |
| 236420 | 2006 DM_{96} | — | February 24, 2006 | Kitt Peak | Spacewatch | · | 1.6 km | MPC; JPL |
| 236421 | 2006 DU_{96} | — | February 24, 2006 | Kitt Peak | Spacewatch | · | 1.7 km | MPC; JPL |
| 236422 | 2006 DC_{97} | — | February 24, 2006 | Mount Lemmon | Mount Lemmon Survey | · | 2.0 km | MPC; JPL |
| 236423 | 2006 DW_{101} | — | February 25, 2006 | Kitt Peak | Spacewatch | · | 1.6 km | MPC; JPL |
| 236424 | 2006 DO_{102} | — | February 25, 2006 | Mount Lemmon | Mount Lemmon Survey | · | 1.7 km | MPC; JPL |
| 236425 | 2006 DF_{103} | — | February 25, 2006 | Mount Lemmon | Mount Lemmon Survey | MAS | 1.2 km | MPC; JPL |
| 236426 | 2006 DS_{114} | — | February 27, 2006 | Kitt Peak | Spacewatch | · | 1.5 km | MPC; JPL |
| 236427 | 2006 DX_{115} | — | February 27, 2006 | Kitt Peak | Spacewatch | · | 2.0 km | MPC; JPL |
| 236428 | 2006 DZ_{115} | — | February 27, 2006 | Kitt Peak | Spacewatch | (17392) | 1.8 km | MPC; JPL |
| 236429 | 2006 DJ_{119} | — | February 20, 2006 | Socorro | LINEAR | · | 1.7 km | MPC; JPL |
| 236430 | 2006 DB_{122} | — | February 22, 2006 | Catalina | CSS | · | 1.9 km | MPC; JPL |
| 236431 | 2006 DM_{126} | — | February 25, 2006 | Kitt Peak | Spacewatch | · | 1.5 km | MPC; JPL |
| 236432 | 2006 DF_{132} | — | February 25, 2006 | Kitt Peak | Spacewatch | · | 1.9 km | MPC; JPL |
| 236433 | 2006 DG_{135} | — | February 25, 2006 | Mount Lemmon | Mount Lemmon Survey | · | 1.1 km | MPC; JPL |
| 236434 | 2006 DX_{140} | — | February 25, 2006 | Kitt Peak | Spacewatch | · | 1.6 km | MPC; JPL |
| 236435 | 2006 DH_{155} | — | February 25, 2006 | Kitt Peak | Spacewatch | (5) | 2.2 km | MPC; JPL |
| 236436 | 2006 DQ_{155} | — | February 25, 2006 | Kitt Peak | Spacewatch | · | 3.2 km | MPC; JPL |
| 236437 | 2006 DJ_{166} | — | February 27, 2006 | Kitt Peak | Spacewatch | · | 2.6 km | MPC; JPL |
| 236438 | 2006 DC_{174} | — | February 27, 2006 | Kitt Peak | Spacewatch | · | 1.5 km | MPC; JPL |
| 236439 | 2006 DW_{174} | — | February 27, 2006 | Kitt Peak | Spacewatch | · | 1.5 km | MPC; JPL |
| 236440 | 2006 DL_{188} | — | February 27, 2006 | Kitt Peak | Spacewatch | · | 1.0 km | MPC; JPL |
| 236441 | 2006 DB_{197} | — | February 24, 2006 | Catalina | CSS | EUN | 1.8 km | MPC; JPL |
| 236442 | 2006 DD_{199} | — | February 23, 2006 | Anderson Mesa | LONEOS | PHO | 1.7 km | MPC; JPL |
| 236443 | 2006 DO_{200} | — | February 24, 2006 | Catalina | CSS | · | 3.1 km | MPC; JPL |
| 236444 | 2006 DA_{204} | — | February 24, 2006 | Catalina | CSS | · | 2.0 km | MPC; JPL |
| 236445 | 2006 DC_{207} | — | February 25, 2006 | Mount Lemmon | Mount Lemmon Survey | · | 2.0 km | MPC; JPL |
| 236446 | 2006 DZ_{207} | — | February 25, 2006 | Kitt Peak | Spacewatch | · | 2.0 km | MPC; JPL |
| 236447 | 2006 DC_{208} | — | February 25, 2006 | Kitt Peak | Spacewatch | (5) | 1.9 km | MPC; JPL |
| 236448 | 2006 DY_{211} | — | February 24, 2006 | Kitt Peak | Spacewatch | · | 2.7 km | MPC; JPL |
| 236449 | 2006 DV_{215} | — | February 25, 2006 | Kitt Peak | Spacewatch | EUN | 1.8 km | MPC; JPL |
| 236450 | 2006 EH_{6} | — | March 2, 2006 | Kitt Peak | Spacewatch | · | 2.2 km | MPC; JPL |
| 236451 | 2006 EX_{10} | — | March 2, 2006 | Kitt Peak | Spacewatch | (5) | 1.4 km | MPC; JPL |
| 236452 | 2006 EA_{19} | — | March 2, 2006 | Mount Lemmon | Mount Lemmon Survey | · | 2.2 km | MPC; JPL |
| 236453 | 2006 EW_{21} | — | March 3, 2006 | Kitt Peak | Spacewatch | · | 2.7 km | MPC; JPL |
| 236454 | 2006 ED_{22} | — | March 3, 2006 | Kitt Peak | Spacewatch | · | 1.9 km | MPC; JPL |
| 236455 | 2006 ES_{32} | — | March 3, 2006 | Mount Lemmon | Mount Lemmon Survey | · | 2.4 km | MPC; JPL |
| 236456 | 2006 EC_{52} | — | March 4, 2006 | Mount Lemmon | Mount Lemmon Survey | PHO | 1.8 km | MPC; JPL |
| 236457 | 2006 EZ_{56} | — | March 5, 2006 | Kitt Peak | Spacewatch | · | 2.2 km | MPC; JPL |
| 236458 | 2006 EM_{57} | — | March 5, 2006 | Kitt Peak | Spacewatch | MAR | 1.8 km | MPC; JPL |
| 236459 | 2006 EF_{58} | — | March 5, 2006 | Kitt Peak | Spacewatch | · | 1.7 km | MPC; JPL |
| 236460 | 2006 EY_{64} | — | March 5, 2006 | Kitt Peak | Spacewatch | · | 2.5 km | MPC; JPL |
| 236461 | 2006 EP_{66} | — | March 6, 2006 | Kitt Peak | Spacewatch | · | 1.7 km | MPC; JPL |
| 236462 | 2006 ER_{72} | — | March 5, 2006 | Kitt Peak | Spacewatch | · | 1.1 km | MPC; JPL |
| 236463 Bretécher | 2006 FF | Bretécher | March 18, 2006 | Nogales | J.-C. Merlin | · | 1.2 km | MPC; JPL |
| 236464 | 2006 FQ | — | March 22, 2006 | Catalina | CSS | · | 1.7 km | MPC; JPL |
| 236465 | 2006 FO_{1} | — | March 21, 2006 | Mount Lemmon | Mount Lemmon Survey | · | 2.3 km | MPC; JPL |
| 236466 | 2006 FQ_{1} | — | March 21, 2006 | Mount Lemmon | Mount Lemmon Survey | · | 3.9 km | MPC; JPL |
| 236467 | 2006 FB_{7} | — | March 23, 2006 | Kitt Peak | Spacewatch | · | 2.8 km | MPC; JPL |
| 236468 | 2006 FY_{7} | — | March 23, 2006 | Kitt Peak | Spacewatch | · | 1.9 km | MPC; JPL |
| 236469 | 2006 FF_{8} | — | March 23, 2006 | Mount Lemmon | Mount Lemmon Survey | · | 1.6 km | MPC; JPL |
| 236470 | 2006 FE_{11} | — | March 23, 2006 | Kitt Peak | Spacewatch | · | 2.7 km | MPC; JPL |
| 236471 | 2006 FF_{11} | — | March 23, 2006 | Kitt Peak | Spacewatch | · | 2.0 km | MPC; JPL |
| 236472 | 2006 FS_{14} | — | March 23, 2006 | Kitt Peak | Spacewatch | · | 2.6 km | MPC; JPL |
| 236473 | 2006 FO_{18} | — | March 23, 2006 | Kitt Peak | Spacewatch | MIS | 3.5 km | MPC; JPL |
| 236474 | 2006 FK_{19} | — | March 23, 2006 | Mount Lemmon | Mount Lemmon Survey | · | 4.9 km | MPC; JPL |
| 236475 | 2006 FT_{20} | — | March 24, 2006 | Bergisch Gladbach | W. Bickel | · | 1.6 km | MPC; JPL |
| 236476 | 2006 FX_{22} | — | March 24, 2006 | Kitt Peak | Spacewatch | · | 2.8 km | MPC; JPL |
| 236477 | 2006 FO_{23} | — | March 24, 2006 | Kitt Peak | Spacewatch | · | 1.7 km | MPC; JPL |
| 236478 | 2006 FL_{26} | — | March 24, 2006 | Mount Lemmon | Mount Lemmon Survey | · | 2.3 km | MPC; JPL |
| 236479 | 2006 FU_{32} | — | March 25, 2006 | Kitt Peak | Spacewatch | · | 2.3 km | MPC; JPL |
| 236480 | 2006 FC_{33} | — | March 25, 2006 | Mount Lemmon | Mount Lemmon Survey | · | 2.7 km | MPC; JPL |
| 236481 | 2006 FM_{34} | — | March 24, 2006 | Catalina | CSS | BRG | 2.3 km | MPC; JPL |
| 236482 | 2006 FO_{34} | — | March 24, 2006 | Siding Spring | SSS | · | 3.8 km | MPC; JPL |
| 236483 | 2006 FW_{34} | — | March 25, 2006 | Palomar | NEAT | EUN | 2.1 km | MPC; JPL |
| 236484 Luchijen | 2006 FQ_{35} | Luchijen | March 28, 2006 | Lulin | Lin, H.-C., Q. Ye | · | 1.7 km | MPC; JPL |
| 236485 | 2006 FK_{36} | — | March 25, 2006 | Mount Lemmon | Mount Lemmon Survey | · | 3.3 km | MPC; JPL |
| 236486 | 2006 FS_{36} | — | March 21, 2006 | Socorro | LINEAR | · | 3.2 km | MPC; JPL |
| 236487 | 2006 FR_{40} | — | March 26, 2006 | Kitt Peak | Spacewatch | MAS | 900 m | MPC; JPL |
| 236488 | 2006 FY_{40} | — | March 26, 2006 | Kitt Peak | Spacewatch | · | 2.2 km | MPC; JPL |
| 236489 | 2006 FO_{44} | — | March 23, 2006 | Kitt Peak | Spacewatch | · | 2.2 km | MPC; JPL |
| 236490 | 2006 FP_{54} | — | March 26, 2006 | Mount Lemmon | Mount Lemmon Survey | · | 2.1 km | MPC; JPL |
| 236491 | 2006 GE_{2} | — | April 2, 2006 | Reedy Creek | J. Broughton | · | 2.1 km | MPC; JPL |
| 236492 | 2006 GG_{3} | — | April 7, 2006 | Ottmarsheim | C. Rinner | EUN | 2.0 km | MPC; JPL |
| 236493 | 2006 GF_{12} | — | April 2, 2006 | Kitt Peak | Spacewatch | (5) | 1.8 km | MPC; JPL |
| 236494 | 2006 GJ_{12} | — | April 2, 2006 | Kitt Peak | Spacewatch | · | 1.6 km | MPC; JPL |
| 236495 | 2006 GJ_{14} | — | April 2, 2006 | Kitt Peak | Spacewatch | · | 2.5 km | MPC; JPL |
| 236496 | 2006 GB_{19} | — | April 2, 2006 | Kitt Peak | Spacewatch | · | 1.9 km | MPC; JPL |
| 236497 | 2006 GU_{20} | — | April 2, 2006 | Kitt Peak | Spacewatch | · | 1.5 km | MPC; JPL |
| 236498 | 2006 GX_{20} | — | April 2, 2006 | Kitt Peak | Spacewatch | · | 1.5 km | MPC; JPL |
| 236499 | 2006 GP_{21} | — | April 2, 2006 | Mount Lemmon | Mount Lemmon Survey | · | 1.3 km | MPC; JPL |
| 236500 | 2006 GA_{23} | — | April 2, 2006 | Kitt Peak | Spacewatch | AEO | 1.8 km | MPC; JPL |

== 236501–236600 ==
back to top

| Designation | | | Discovery | | | Properties | | Ref |
| Permanent | Provisional | Named after | Date | Site | Discoverer(s) | Category | Diam. | Ref |
|---|---|---|---|---|---|---|---|---|
| 236501 | 2006 GT_{26} | — | April 2, 2006 | Kitt Peak | Spacewatch | · | 1.7 km | MPC; JPL |
| 236502 | 2006 GR_{28} | — | April 2, 2006 | Kitt Peak | Spacewatch | RAF | 1.5 km | MPC; JPL |
| 236503 | 2006 GO_{30} | — | April 2, 2006 | Mount Lemmon | Mount Lemmon Survey | · | 2.3 km | MPC; JPL |
| 236504 | 2006 GC_{31} | — | April 2, 2006 | Kitt Peak | Spacewatch | · | 3.1 km | MPC; JPL |
| 236505 | 2006 GQ_{34} | — | April 7, 2006 | Catalina | CSS | · | 5.8 km | MPC; JPL |
| 236506 | 2006 GS_{36} | — | April 8, 2006 | Kitt Peak | Spacewatch | · | 3.1 km | MPC; JPL |
| 236507 | 2006 GU_{36} | — | April 8, 2006 | Kitt Peak | Spacewatch | · | 1.6 km | MPC; JPL |
| 236508 | 2006 GO_{38} | — | April 4, 2006 | Črni Vrh | Matičič, S. | (194) | 4.2 km | MPC; JPL |
| 236509 | 2006 GK_{41} | — | April 7, 2006 | Catalina | CSS | · | 6.4 km | MPC; JPL |
| 236510 | 2006 GA_{43} | — | April 13, 2006 | Palomar | NEAT | · | 2.5 km | MPC; JPL |
| 236511 | 2006 GL_{45} | — | April 7, 2006 | Kitt Peak | Spacewatch | · | 2.7 km | MPC; JPL |
| 236512 | 2006 GL_{46} | — | April 8, 2006 | Kitt Peak | Spacewatch | MIS | 1.8 km | MPC; JPL |
| 236513 | 2006 GE_{47} | — | April 9, 2006 | Kitt Peak | Spacewatch | · | 1.9 km | MPC; JPL |
| 236514 | 2006 GB_{48} | — | April 9, 2006 | Kitt Peak | Spacewatch | · | 1.5 km | MPC; JPL |
| 236515 | 2006 GF_{48} | — | April 9, 2006 | Kitt Peak | Spacewatch | · | 2.5 km | MPC; JPL |
| 236516 | 2006 GR_{48} | — | April 9, 2006 | Kitt Peak | Spacewatch | · | 3.2 km | MPC; JPL |
| 236517 | 2006 GH_{49} | — | April 2, 2006 | Catalina | CSS | · | 5.9 km | MPC; JPL |
| 236518 | 2006 GL_{50} | — | April 9, 2006 | Catalina | CSS | · | 3.5 km | MPC; JPL |
| 236519 | 2006 GV_{52} | — | April 8, 2006 | Anderson Mesa | LONEOS | (116763) | 1.9 km | MPC; JPL |
| 236520 | 2006 HA_{3} | — | April 18, 2006 | Kitt Peak | Spacewatch | · | 1.3 km | MPC; JPL |
| 236521 | 2006 HG_{3} | — | April 18, 2006 | Kitt Peak | Spacewatch | · | 2.3 km | MPC; JPL |
| 236522 | 2006 HQ_{4} | — | April 19, 2006 | Anderson Mesa | LONEOS | · | 2.0 km | MPC; JPL |
| 236523 | 2006 HA_{5} | — | April 19, 2006 | Mount Lemmon | Mount Lemmon Survey | · | 1.9 km | MPC; JPL |
| 236524 | 2006 HT_{5} | — | April 19, 2006 | Kitt Peak | Spacewatch | JUN | 1.3 km | MPC; JPL |
| 236525 | 2006 HS_{9} | — | April 19, 2006 | Kitt Peak | Spacewatch | · | 6.0 km | MPC; JPL |
| 236526 | 2006 HE_{11} | — | April 19, 2006 | Kitt Peak | Spacewatch | EUN | 1.4 km | MPC; JPL |
| 236527 | 2006 HP_{11} | — | April 19, 2006 | Kitt Peak | Spacewatch | · | 3.0 km | MPC; JPL |
| 236528 | 2006 HV_{12} | — | April 19, 2006 | Kitt Peak | Spacewatch | · | 2.2 km | MPC; JPL |
| 236529 | 2006 HL_{13} | — | April 19, 2006 | Palomar | NEAT | ERI | 3.1 km | MPC; JPL |
| 236530 | 2006 HF_{16} | — | April 20, 2006 | Kitt Peak | Spacewatch | · | 3.2 km | MPC; JPL |
| 236531 | 2006 HK_{19} | — | April 18, 2006 | Kitt Peak | Spacewatch | · | 1.4 km | MPC; JPL |
| 236532 | 2006 HV_{25} | — | April 20, 2006 | Kitt Peak | Spacewatch | · | 3.0 km | MPC; JPL |
| 236533 | 2006 HB_{26} | — | April 20, 2006 | Kitt Peak | Spacewatch | HOF | 3.5 km | MPC; JPL |
| 236534 | 2006 HD_{29} | — | April 21, 2006 | Catalina | CSS | · | 4.1 km | MPC; JPL |
| 236535 | 2006 HM_{30} | — | April 20, 2006 | Catalina | CSS | · | 2.2 km | MPC; JPL |
| 236536 | 2006 HR_{34} | — | April 19, 2006 | Catalina | CSS | · | 1.9 km | MPC; JPL |
| 236537 | 2006 HH_{35} | — | April 19, 2006 | Mount Lemmon | Mount Lemmon Survey | · | 1.9 km | MPC; JPL |
| 236538 | 2006 HB_{38} | — | April 21, 2006 | Kitt Peak | Spacewatch | · | 2.1 km | MPC; JPL |
| 236539 | 2006 HU_{38} | — | April 21, 2006 | Kitt Peak | Spacewatch | AGN | 1.7 km | MPC; JPL |
| 236540 | 2006 HW_{38} | — | April 21, 2006 | Kitt Peak | Spacewatch | · | 2.5 km | MPC; JPL |
| 236541 | 2006 HN_{42} | — | April 23, 2006 | Socorro | LINEAR | · | 1.6 km | MPC; JPL |
| 236542 | 2006 HM_{43} | — | April 24, 2006 | Mount Lemmon | Mount Lemmon Survey | · | 2.5 km | MPC; JPL |
| 236543 | 2006 HK_{45} | — | April 25, 2006 | Kitt Peak | Spacewatch | · | 1.7 km | MPC; JPL |
| 236544 | 2006 HH_{46} | — | April 25, 2006 | Catalina | CSS | EUN | 2.1 km | MPC; JPL |
| 236545 | 2006 HD_{47} | — | April 20, 2006 | Kitt Peak | Spacewatch | · | 1.7 km | MPC; JPL |
| 236546 | 2006 HG_{47} | — | April 21, 2006 | Catalina | CSS | EUN | 1.8 km | MPC; JPL |
| 236547 | 2006 HH_{47} | — | April 21, 2006 | Catalina | CSS | (5) | 3.2 km | MPC; JPL |
| 236548 | 2006 HW_{48} | — | April 24, 2006 | Anderson Mesa | LONEOS | · | 2.1 km | MPC; JPL |
| 236549 | 2006 HD_{51} | — | April 24, 2006 | Reedy Creek | J. Broughton | · | 3.4 km | MPC; JPL |
| 236550 | 2006 HP_{51} | — | April 26, 2006 | Reedy Creek | J. Broughton | ADE | 3.7 km | MPC; JPL |
| 236551 | 2006 HT_{52} | — | April 18, 2006 | Catalina | CSS | · | 2.0 km | MPC; JPL |
| 236552 | 2006 HA_{55} | — | April 21, 2006 | Catalina | CSS | ADE | 3.0 km | MPC; JPL |
| 236553 | 2006 HU_{58} | — | April 21, 2006 | Catalina | CSS | · | 3.5 km | MPC; JPL |
| 236554 | 2006 HX_{58} | — | April 21, 2006 | Siding Spring | SSS | ADE | 4.5 km | MPC; JPL |
| 236555 | 2006 HK_{59} | — | April 21, 2006 | Siding Spring | SSS | · | 3.3 km | MPC; JPL |
| 236556 | 2006 HV_{59} | — | April 24, 2006 | Anderson Mesa | LONEOS | · | 2.9 km | MPC; JPL |
| 236557 | 2006 HB_{64} | — | April 24, 2006 | Kitt Peak | Spacewatch | HOF | 3.0 km | MPC; JPL |
| 236558 | 2006 HH_{66} | — | April 24, 2006 | Kitt Peak | Spacewatch | · | 3.0 km | MPC; JPL |
| 236559 | 2006 HZ_{68} | — | April 24, 2006 | Mount Lemmon | Mount Lemmon Survey | · | 2.3 km | MPC; JPL |
| 236560 | 2006 HO_{69} | — | April 24, 2006 | Anderson Mesa | LONEOS | · | 3.4 km | MPC; JPL |
| 236561 | 2006 HZ_{74} | — | April 25, 2006 | Catalina | CSS | EUN | 2.3 km | MPC; JPL |
| 236562 | 2006 HD_{75} | — | April 25, 2006 | Kitt Peak | Spacewatch | EUN | 1.7 km | MPC; JPL |
| 236563 | 2006 HL_{78} | — | April 26, 2006 | Mount Lemmon | Mount Lemmon Survey | · | 3.5 km | MPC; JPL |
| 236564 | 2006 HB_{80} | — | April 26, 2006 | Kitt Peak | Spacewatch | AST | 2.9 km | MPC; JPL |
| 236565 | 2006 HB_{81} | — | April 26, 2006 | Kitt Peak | Spacewatch | · | 1.6 km | MPC; JPL |
| 236566 | 2006 HZ_{83} | — | April 26, 2006 | Kitt Peak | Spacewatch | · | 2.7 km | MPC; JPL |
| 236567 | 2006 HB_{86} | — | April 27, 2006 | Kitt Peak | Spacewatch | EOS | 4.9 km | MPC; JPL |
| 236568 | 2006 HQ_{86} | — | April 27, 2006 | Socorro | LINEAR | · | 1.9 km | MPC; JPL |
| 236569 | 2006 HS_{88} | — | April 30, 2006 | Kitt Peak | Spacewatch | · | 2.8 km | MPC; JPL |
| 236570 | 2006 HJ_{89} | — | April 20, 2006 | Anderson Mesa | LONEOS | · | 2.0 km | MPC; JPL |
| 236571 | 2006 HV_{91} | — | April 29, 2006 | Kitt Peak | Spacewatch | NEM | 2.9 km | MPC; JPL |
| 236572 | 2006 HK_{92} | — | April 29, 2006 | Kitt Peak | Spacewatch | · | 2.0 km | MPC; JPL |
| 236573 | 2006 HS_{92} | — | April 29, 2006 | Kitt Peak | Spacewatch | · | 2.1 km | MPC; JPL |
| 236574 | 2006 HG_{93} | — | April 29, 2006 | Kitt Peak | Spacewatch | · | 2.2 km | MPC; JPL |
| 236575 | 2006 HS_{95} | — | April 30, 2006 | Kitt Peak | Spacewatch | · | 3.6 km | MPC; JPL |
| 236576 | 2006 HL_{96} | — | April 30, 2006 | Kitt Peak | Spacewatch | · | 1.8 km | MPC; JPL |
| 236577 | 2006 HV_{99} | — | April 30, 2006 | Kitt Peak | Spacewatch | AGN | 1.3 km | MPC; JPL |
| 236578 | 2006 HW_{99} | — | April 30, 2006 | Kitt Peak | Spacewatch | · | 2.8 km | MPC; JPL |
| 236579 | 2006 HE_{101} | — | April 30, 2006 | Kitt Peak | Spacewatch | · | 2.7 km | MPC; JPL |
| 236580 | 2006 HR_{101} | — | April 30, 2006 | Kitt Peak | Spacewatch | AGN | 1.2 km | MPC; JPL |
| 236581 | 2006 HL_{104} | — | April 30, 2006 | Kitt Peak | Spacewatch | EUN | 2.2 km | MPC; JPL |
| 236582 | 2006 HT_{104} | — | April 19, 2006 | Anderson Mesa | LONEOS | · | 2.2 km | MPC; JPL |
| 236583 | 2006 HX_{105} | — | April 29, 2006 | Siding Spring | SSS | EUN | 1.7 km | MPC; JPL |
| 236584 | 2006 HB_{106} | — | April 30, 2006 | Kitt Peak | Spacewatch | · | 3.4 km | MPC; JPL |
| 236585 | 2006 HR_{111} | — | April 29, 2006 | Siding Spring | SSS | · | 2.9 km | MPC; JPL |
| 236586 | 2006 HQ_{117} | — | April 29, 2006 | Kitt Peak | Spacewatch | AGN | 1.4 km | MPC; JPL |
| 236587 | 2006 HT_{119} | — | April 30, 2006 | Kitt Peak | Spacewatch | · | 2.1 km | MPC; JPL |
| 236588 | 2006 HV_{120} | — | April 30, 2006 | Kitt Peak | Spacewatch | · | 2.2 km | MPC; JPL |
| 236589 | 2006 HO_{121} | — | April 30, 2006 | Kitt Peak | Spacewatch | · | 2.8 km | MPC; JPL |
| 236590 | 2006 HV_{121} | — | April 30, 2006 | Catalina | CSS | · | 3.3 km | MPC; JPL |
| 236591 | 2006 HW_{121} | — | April 30, 2006 | Catalina | CSS | · | 4.8 km | MPC; JPL |
| 236592 | 2006 HB_{128} | — | April 29, 2006 | Siding Spring | SSS | · | 1.6 km | MPC; JPL |
| 236593 | 2006 HD_{151} | — | April 26, 2006 | Kitt Peak | Spacewatch | · | 1.5 km | MPC; JPL |
| 236594 | 2006 JS_{4} | — | May 2, 2006 | Mount Lemmon | Mount Lemmon Survey | · | 1.5 km | MPC; JPL |
| 236595 | 2006 JX_{4} | — | May 2, 2006 | Mount Lemmon | Mount Lemmon Survey | · | 2.9 km | MPC; JPL |
| 236596 | 2006 JN_{5} | — | May 3, 2006 | Mount Lemmon | Mount Lemmon Survey | KOR | 1.5 km | MPC; JPL |
| 236597 | 2006 JB_{6} | — | May 2, 2006 | Mount Nyukasa | Japan Aerospace Exploration Agency | · | 2.8 km | MPC; JPL |
| 236598 | 2006 JT_{7} | — | May 1, 2006 | Kitt Peak | Spacewatch | · | 3.3 km | MPC; JPL |
| 236599 | 2006 JZ_{12} | — | May 1, 2006 | Kitt Peak | Spacewatch | · | 2.5 km | MPC; JPL |
| 236600 | 2006 JF_{16} | — | May 2, 2006 | Mount Lemmon | Mount Lemmon Survey | · | 1.9 km | MPC; JPL |

== 236601–236700 ==
back to top

| Designation | | | Discovery | | | Properties | | Ref |
| Permanent | Provisional | Named after | Date | Site | Discoverer(s) | Category | Diam. | Ref |
|---|---|---|---|---|---|---|---|---|
| 236601 | 2006 JZ_{16} | — | May 2, 2006 | Kitt Peak | Spacewatch | TRE | 4.4 km | MPC; JPL |
| 236602 | 2006 JM_{17} | — | May 2, 2006 | Mount Lemmon | Mount Lemmon Survey | AGN | 2.0 km | MPC; JPL |
| 236603 | 2006 JM_{18} | — | May 2, 2006 | Mount Lemmon | Mount Lemmon Survey | EUN | 4.1 km | MPC; JPL |
| 236604 | 2006 JT_{18} | — | May 2, 2006 | Mount Lemmon | Mount Lemmon Survey | · | 3.1 km | MPC; JPL |
| 236605 | 2006 JM_{28} | — | May 3, 2006 | Kitt Peak | Spacewatch | (5) | 1.8 km | MPC; JPL |
| 236606 | 2006 JA_{29} | — | May 3, 2006 | Kitt Peak | Spacewatch | · | 1.9 km | MPC; JPL |
| 236607 | 2006 JP_{35} | — | May 4, 2006 | Kitt Peak | Spacewatch | · | 3.0 km | MPC; JPL |
| 236608 | 2006 JH_{39} | — | May 6, 2006 | Mount Lemmon | Mount Lemmon Survey | KOR | 1.7 km | MPC; JPL |
| 236609 | 2006 JK_{40} | — | May 7, 2006 | Mount Lemmon | Mount Lemmon Survey | · | 2.3 km | MPC; JPL |
| 236610 | 2006 JL_{42} | — | May 2, 2006 | Kitt Peak | Spacewatch | · | 2.3 km | MPC; JPL |
| 236611 | 2006 JQ_{42} | — | May 2, 2006 | Kitt Peak | Spacewatch | AGN | 1.3 km | MPC; JPL |
| 236612 | 2006 JL_{44} | — | May 6, 2006 | Kitt Peak | Spacewatch | · | 5.8 km | MPC; JPL |
| 236613 | 2006 JW_{44} | — | May 7, 2006 | Mount Lemmon | Mount Lemmon Survey | · | 1.9 km | MPC; JPL |
| 236614 | 2006 JA_{46} | — | May 9, 2006 | Mount Lemmon | Mount Lemmon Survey | · | 3.2 km | MPC; JPL |
| 236615 | 2006 JB_{48} | — | May 5, 2006 | Kitt Peak | Spacewatch | · | 1.8 km | MPC; JPL |
| 236616 Gray | 2006 JR_{61} | Gray | May 1, 2006 | Mauna Kea | P. A. Wiegert | · | 1.8 km | MPC; JPL |
| 236617 Loriglaze | 2006 JL_{63} | Loriglaze | May 1, 2006 | Kitt Peak | M. W. Buie | MAS | 1.1 km | MPC; JPL |
| 236618 | 2006 JX_{79} | — | May 8, 2006 | Mount Lemmon | Mount Lemmon Survey | · | 2.9 km | MPC; JPL |
| 236619 | 2006 KD | — | May 16, 2006 | Palomar | NEAT | · | 3.8 km | MPC; JPL |
| 236620 | 2006 KZ | — | May 18, 2006 | Palomar | NEAT | · | 1.9 km | MPC; JPL |
| 236621 | 2006 KX_{1} | — | May 21, 2006 | Reedy Creek | J. Broughton | (5) | 2.1 km | MPC; JPL |
| 236622 | 2006 KA_{2} | — | May 17, 2006 | Palomar | NEAT | · | 2.1 km | MPC; JPL |
| 236623 | 2006 KF_{2} | — | May 17, 2006 | Siding Spring | SSS | · | 2.9 km | MPC; JPL |
| 236624 | 2006 KR_{6} | — | May 19, 2006 | Mount Lemmon | Mount Lemmon Survey | KOR | 1.5 km | MPC; JPL |
| 236625 | 2006 KT_{9} | — | May 19, 2006 | Catalina | CSS | EUN | 1.8 km | MPC; JPL |
| 236626 | 2006 KD_{11} | — | May 19, 2006 | Mount Lemmon | Mount Lemmon Survey | · | 2.2 km | MPC; JPL |
| 236627 | 2006 KU_{11} | — | May 19, 2006 | Palomar | NEAT | · | 3.3 km | MPC; JPL |
| 236628 | 2006 KF_{15} | — | May 20, 2006 | Catalina | CSS | · | 3.3 km | MPC; JPL |
| 236629 | 2006 KB_{19} | — | May 21, 2006 | Kitt Peak | Spacewatch | · | 2.6 km | MPC; JPL |
| 236630 | 2006 KY_{19} | — | May 18, 2006 | Palomar | NEAT | · | 2.3 km | MPC; JPL |
| 236631 | 2006 KY_{20} | — | May 20, 2006 | Catalina | CSS | · | 3.5 km | MPC; JPL |
| 236632 | 2006 KG_{21} | — | May 21, 2006 | Mount Lemmon | Mount Lemmon Survey | · | 4.8 km | MPC; JPL |
| 236633 | 2006 KS_{23} | — | May 18, 2006 | Catalina | CSS | · | 2.6 km | MPC; JPL |
| 236634 | 2006 KM_{32} | — | May 20, 2006 | Kitt Peak | Spacewatch | · | 2.8 km | MPC; JPL |
| 236635 | 2006 KS_{33} | — | May 20, 2006 | Kitt Peak | Spacewatch | · | 3.1 km | MPC; JPL |
| 236636 | 2006 KC_{35} | — | May 20, 2006 | Kitt Peak | Spacewatch | · | 1.4 km | MPC; JPL |
| 236637 | 2006 KK_{38} | — | May 20, 2006 | Catalina | CSS | · | 2.8 km | MPC; JPL |
| 236638 | 2006 KQ_{38} | — | May 24, 2006 | Vail-Jarnac | Jarnac | · | 1.8 km | MPC; JPL |
| 236639 | 2006 KJ_{39} | — | May 18, 2006 | Siding Spring | SSS | EUN | 1.8 km | MPC; JPL |
| 236640 | 2006 KL_{39} | — | May 20, 2006 | Anderson Mesa | LONEOS | ADE | 3.8 km | MPC; JPL |
| 236641 | 2006 KQ_{40} | — | May 19, 2006 | Mount Lemmon | Mount Lemmon Survey | · | 2.8 km | MPC; JPL |
| 236642 | 2006 KQ_{42} | — | May 20, 2006 | Kitt Peak | Spacewatch | KOR | 1.7 km | MPC; JPL |
| 236643 | 2006 KC_{46} | — | May 21, 2006 | Mount Lemmon | Mount Lemmon Survey | · | 2.7 km | MPC; JPL |
| 236644 | 2006 KM_{50} | — | May 21, 2006 | Kitt Peak | Spacewatch | · | 2.6 km | MPC; JPL |
| 236645 | 2006 KG_{51} | — | May 21, 2006 | Mount Lemmon | Mount Lemmon Survey | · | 2.0 km | MPC; JPL |
| 236646 | 2006 KW_{61} | — | May 22, 2006 | Kitt Peak | Spacewatch | · | 3.0 km | MPC; JPL |
| 236647 | 2006 KX_{61} | — | May 22, 2006 | Kitt Peak | Spacewatch | · | 2.9 km | MPC; JPL |
| 236648 | 2006 KE_{71} | — | May 22, 2006 | Kitt Peak | Spacewatch | · | 2.9 km | MPC; JPL |
| 236649 | 2006 KJ_{73} | — | May 23, 2006 | Kitt Peak | Spacewatch | · | 5.4 km | MPC; JPL |
| 236650 | 2006 KM_{76} | — | May 24, 2006 | Mount Lemmon | Mount Lemmon Survey | · | 1.8 km | MPC; JPL |
| 236651 | 2006 KK_{81} | — | May 25, 2006 | Palomar | NEAT | (5) | 2.0 km | MPC; JPL |
| 236652 | 2006 KH_{85} | — | May 19, 2006 | Anderson Mesa | LONEOS | · | 2.2 km | MPC; JPL |
| 236653 | 2006 KN_{99} | — | May 27, 2006 | Catalina | CSS | · | 1.8 km | MPC; JPL |
| 236654 | 2006 KV_{99} | — | May 29, 2006 | Socorro | LINEAR | · | 3.1 km | MPC; JPL |
| 236655 | 2006 KL_{104} | — | May 26, 2006 | Mount Lemmon | Mount Lemmon Survey | · | 2.1 km | MPC; JPL |
| 236656 | 2006 KH_{113} | — | May 19, 2006 | Catalina | CSS | · | 2.2 km | MPC; JPL |
| 236657 | 2006 KU_{114} | — | May 28, 2006 | Siding Spring | SSS | · | 4.3 km | MPC; JPL |
| 236658 | 2006 KH_{116} | — | May 29, 2006 | Kitt Peak | Spacewatch | AGN | 1.5 km | MPC; JPL |
| 236659 | 2006 KZ_{116} | — | May 29, 2006 | Kitt Peak | Spacewatch | · | 2.1 km | MPC; JPL |
| 236660 | 2006 KQ_{117} | — | May 31, 2006 | Mount Lemmon | Mount Lemmon Survey | HOF | 3.0 km | MPC; JPL |
| 236661 | 2006 KW_{123} | — | May 24, 2006 | Anderson Mesa | LONEOS | AEG | 4.9 km | MPC; JPL |
| 236662 | 2006 LJ | — | June 1, 2006 | Reedy Creek | J. Broughton | · | 4.8 km | MPC; JPL |
| 236663 | 2006 LN_{2} | — | June 4, 2006 | Socorro | LINEAR | · | 2.8 km | MPC; JPL |
| 236664 | 2006 LB_{6} | — | June 3, 2006 | Mount Lemmon | Mount Lemmon Survey | · | 5.4 km | MPC; JPL |
| 236665 | 2006 MJ_{1} | — | June 17, 2006 | Kitt Peak | Spacewatch | · | 2.9 km | MPC; JPL |
| 236666 | 2006 MJ_{7} | — | June 18, 2006 | Kitt Peak | Spacewatch | · | 2.9 km | MPC; JPL |
| 236667 | 2006 OG_{16} | — | July 29, 2006 | Reedy Creek | J. Broughton | · | 3.1 km | MPC; JPL |
| 236668 | 2006 PJ | — | August 3, 2006 | Pla D'Arguines | R. Ferrando | VER | 4.2 km | MPC; JPL |
| 236669 | 2006 PD_{1} | — | August 14, 2006 | Hibiscus | S. F. Hönig | · | 5.7 km | MPC; JPL |
| 236670 | 2006 PA_{23} | — | August 7, 2006 | Siding Spring | SSS | · | 7.5 km | MPC; JPL |
| 236671 | 2006 PQ_{32} | — | August 15, 2006 | Siding Spring | SSS | T_{j} (2.98) · EUP | 6.9 km | MPC; JPL |
| 236672 | 2006 PK_{35} | — | August 12, 2006 | Palomar | NEAT | · | 4.0 km | MPC; JPL |
| 236673 | 2006 QC_{3} | — | August 17, 2006 | Palomar | NEAT | 3:2 · SHU | 7.4 km | MPC; JPL |
| 236674 | 2006 QA_{5} | — | August 19, 2006 | Kitt Peak | Spacewatch | THM | 3.1 km | MPC; JPL |
| 236675 | 2006 QN_{26} | — | August 19, 2006 | Kitt Peak | Spacewatch | · | 3.9 km | MPC; JPL |
| 236676 | 2006 QN_{29} | — | August 16, 2006 | Siding Spring | SSS | · | 4.7 km | MPC; JPL |
| 236677 | 2006 QB_{33} | — | August 22, 2006 | Palomar | NEAT | HIL · 3:2 | 9.4 km | MPC; JPL |
| 236678 | 2006 QY_{44} | — | August 19, 2006 | Palomar | NEAT | SYL · CYB | 8.1 km | MPC; JPL |
| 236679 | 2006 QB_{60} | — | August 19, 2006 | Palomar | NEAT | · | 3.7 km | MPC; JPL |
| 236680 | 2006 QH_{64} | — | August 26, 2006 | Socorro | LINEAR | · | 4.7 km | MPC; JPL |
| 236681 | 2006 QA_{100} | — | August 24, 2006 | Socorro | LINEAR | · | 3.8 km | MPC; JPL |
| 236682 | 2006 QU_{104} | — | August 28, 2006 | Socorro | LINEAR | T_{j} (2.97) | 6.2 km | MPC; JPL |
| 236683 Hujingyao | 2006 QE_{111} | Hujingyao | August 28, 2006 | Lulin | Lin, H.-C., Q. Ye | · | 5.2 km | MPC; JPL |
| 236684 | 2006 QZ_{134} | — | August 27, 2006 | Anderson Mesa | LONEOS | LIX | 3.7 km | MPC; JPL |
| 236685 | 2006 RX_{30} | — | September 15, 2006 | Socorro | LINEAR | DOR | 4.4 km | MPC; JPL |
| 236686 | 2006 RG_{91} | — | September 15, 2006 | Kitt Peak | Spacewatch | · | 2.4 km | MPC; JPL |
| 236687 | 2006 SK_{42} | — | September 18, 2006 | Catalina | CSS | · | 5.9 km | MPC; JPL |
| 236688 | 2006 SF_{65} | — | September 16, 2006 | Kitt Peak | Spacewatch | · | 3.2 km | MPC; JPL |
| 236689 | 2006 ST_{79} | — | September 17, 2006 | Catalina | CSS | · | 7.4 km | MPC; JPL |
| 236690 | 2006 SC_{186} | — | September 25, 2006 | Mount Lemmon | Mount Lemmon Survey | · | 2.7 km | MPC; JPL |
| 236691 | 2006 SK_{240} | — | September 26, 2006 | Kitt Peak | Spacewatch | THM | 4.5 km | MPC; JPL |
| 236692 | 2006 SS_{291} | — | September 19, 2006 | Siding Spring | SSS | · | 6.3 km | MPC; JPL |
| 236693 | 2006 UM_{22} | — | October 16, 2006 | Mount Lemmon | Mount Lemmon Survey | HYG | 3.3 km | MPC; JPL |
| 236694 | 2006 UB_{65} | — | October 16, 2006 | Kitt Peak | Spacewatch | THM | 3.3 km | MPC; JPL |
| 236695 | 2006 WY_{178} | — | November 24, 2006 | Catalina | CSS | · | 4.9 km | MPC; JPL |
| 236696 | 2007 DE_{53} | — | February 19, 2007 | Mount Lemmon | Mount Lemmon Survey | · | 1.0 km | MPC; JPL |
| 236697 | 2007 DH_{56} | — | February 21, 2007 | Mount Lemmon | Mount Lemmon Survey | · | 1.0 km | MPC; JPL |
| 236698 | 2007 DF_{72} | — | February 21, 2007 | Kitt Peak | Spacewatch | · | 1.1 km | MPC; JPL |
| 236699 | 2007 EN_{9} | — | March 9, 2007 | Palomar | NEAT | PHO | 3.0 km | MPC; JPL |
| 236700 | 2007 EO_{28} | — | March 9, 2007 | Palomar | NEAT | · | 1.1 km | MPC; JPL |

== 236701–236800 ==
back to top

| Designation | | | Discovery | | | Properties | | Ref |
| Permanent | Provisional | Named after | Date | Site | Discoverer(s) | Category | Diam. | Ref |
|---|---|---|---|---|---|---|---|---|
| 236701 | 2007 EH_{38} | — | March 11, 2007 | Mount Lemmon | Mount Lemmon Survey | fast | 3.4 km | MPC; JPL |
| 236702 | 2007 EG_{48} | — | March 9, 2007 | Kitt Peak | Spacewatch | · | 920 m | MPC; JPL |
| 236703 | 2007 EL_{48} | — | March 9, 2007 | Kitt Peak | Spacewatch | · | 1.1 km | MPC; JPL |
| 236704 | 2007 EM_{118} | — | March 13, 2007 | Mount Lemmon | Mount Lemmon Survey | · | 780 m | MPC; JPL |
| 236705 | 2007 ES_{124} | — | March 14, 2007 | Catalina | CSS | · | 3.3 km | MPC; JPL |
| 236706 | 2007 EL_{169} | — | March 13, 2007 | Kitt Peak | Spacewatch | · | 1.5 km | MPC; JPL |
| 236707 | 2007 EK_{181} | — | March 14, 2007 | Kitt Peak | Spacewatch | · | 1.7 km | MPC; JPL |
| 236708 | 2007 EA_{198} | — | March 15, 2007 | Kitt Peak | Spacewatch | · | 860 m | MPC; JPL |
| 236709 | 2007 EG_{198} | — | March 15, 2007 | Mount Lemmon | Mount Lemmon Survey | · | 860 m | MPC; JPL |
| 236710 | 2007 EC_{213} | — | March 14, 2007 | Siding Spring | SSS | EUN | 3.2 km | MPC; JPL |
| 236711 | 2007 FS | — | March 16, 2007 | Anderson Mesa | LONEOS | · | 2.4 km | MPC; JPL |
| 236712 | 2007 FO_{7} | — | March 16, 2007 | Mount Lemmon | Mount Lemmon Survey | · | 970 m | MPC; JPL |
| 236713 | 2007 FE_{15} | — | March 16, 2007 | Kitt Peak | Spacewatch | · | 870 m | MPC; JPL |
| 236714 | 2007 FJ_{22} | — | March 20, 2007 | Kitt Peak | Spacewatch | · | 740 m | MPC; JPL |
| 236715 | 2007 FL_{31} | — | March 20, 2007 | Kitt Peak | Spacewatch | · | 790 m | MPC; JPL |
| 236716 | 2007 FV_{42} | — | March 20, 2007 | Catalina | CSS | AMO +1km | 930 m | MPC; JPL |
| 236717 | 2007 GL_{8} | — | April 7, 2007 | Mount Lemmon | Mount Lemmon Survey | · | 570 m | MPC; JPL |
| 236718 | 2007 GO_{8} | — | April 7, 2007 | Mount Lemmon | Mount Lemmon Survey | · | 1.0 km | MPC; JPL |
| 236719 | 2007 GP_{19} | — | April 11, 2007 | Kitt Peak | Spacewatch | · | 750 m | MPC; JPL |
| 236720 | 2007 GO_{20} | — | April 11, 2007 | Mount Lemmon | Mount Lemmon Survey | · | 1.4 km | MPC; JPL |
| 236721 | 2007 GC_{22} | — | April 11, 2007 | Mount Lemmon | Mount Lemmon Survey | · | 780 m | MPC; JPL |
| 236722 | 2007 GE_{27} | — | April 14, 2007 | Kitt Peak | Spacewatch | · | 1.6 km | MPC; JPL |
| 236723 | 2007 GW_{45} | — | April 14, 2007 | Kitt Peak | Spacewatch | · | 640 m | MPC; JPL |
| 236724 | 2007 GL_{48} | — | April 14, 2007 | Kitt Peak | Spacewatch | fast? | 870 m | MPC; JPL |
| 236725 | 2007 GA_{65} | — | April 15, 2007 | Kitt Peak | Spacewatch | · | 810 m | MPC; JPL |
| 236726 | 2007 GP_{72} | — | April 15, 2007 | Mount Lemmon | Mount Lemmon Survey | · | 920 m | MPC; JPL |
| 236727 | 2007 HN_{3} | — | April 16, 2007 | Socorro | LINEAR | · | 2.7 km | MPC; JPL |
| 236728 Leandri | 2007 HP_{14} | Leandri | April 19, 2007 | Saint-Sulpice | B. Christophe | LIX | 5.4 km | MPC; JPL |
| 236729 | 2007 HZ_{18} | — | April 17, 2007 | Anderson Mesa | LONEOS | · | 810 m | MPC; JPL |
| 236730 | 2007 HQ_{27} | — | April 18, 2007 | Kitt Peak | Spacewatch | · | 740 m | MPC; JPL |
| 236731 | 2007 HZ_{32} | — | April 19, 2007 | Mount Lemmon | Mount Lemmon Survey | · | 820 m | MPC; JPL |
| 236732 | 2007 HK_{51} | — | April 20, 2007 | Kitt Peak | Spacewatch | · | 880 m | MPC; JPL |
| 236733 | 2007 HY_{76} | — | April 23, 2007 | Kitt Peak | Spacewatch | · | 830 m | MPC; JPL |
| 236734 | 2007 HZ_{88} | — | April 22, 2007 | Kitt Peak | Spacewatch | · | 710 m | MPC; JPL |
| 236735 | 2007 HB_{89} | — | April 22, 2007 | Kitt Peak | Spacewatch | HOF | 3.0 km | MPC; JPL |
| 236736 | 2007 JO_{9} | — | May 9, 2007 | Catalina | CSS | · | 1.1 km | MPC; JPL |
| 236737 | 2007 JC_{18} | — | May 8, 2007 | Kitt Peak | Spacewatch | · | 1.7 km | MPC; JPL |
| 236738 | 2007 JD_{23} | — | May 7, 2007 | Kitt Peak | Spacewatch | · | 870 m | MPC; JPL |
| 236739 | 2007 JZ_{24} | — | May 9, 2007 | Mount Lemmon | Mount Lemmon Survey | · | 810 m | MPC; JPL |
| 236740 | 2007 JL_{27} | — | May 9, 2007 | Kitt Peak | Spacewatch | · | 1.1 km | MPC; JPL |
| 236741 | 2007 JF_{29} | — | May 10, 2007 | Mount Lemmon | Mount Lemmon Survey | · | 4.2 km | MPC; JPL |
| 236742 | 2007 JF_{32} | — | May 12, 2007 | Mount Lemmon | Mount Lemmon Survey | NYS | 1.3 km | MPC; JPL |
| 236743 Zhejiangdaxue | 2007 JU_{34} | Zhejiangdaxue | May 7, 2007 | Lulin | Q. Ye, Shih, C.-Y. | · | 820 m | MPC; JPL |
| 236744 | 2007 JZ_{41} | — | May 14, 2007 | Siding Spring | SSS | · | 4.0 km | MPC; JPL |
| 236745 | 2007 KS_{8} | — | May 25, 2007 | Catalina | CSS | · | 4.1 km | MPC; JPL |
| 236746 Chareslindos | 2007 LP | Chareslindos | June 8, 2007 | Vallemare Borbona | V. S. Casulli | · | 1.4 km | MPC; JPL |
| 236747 | 2007 LR_{3} | — | June 8, 2007 | Kitt Peak | Spacewatch | · | 880 m | MPC; JPL |
| 236748 | 2007 LF_{4} | — | June 8, 2007 | Kitt Peak | Spacewatch | · | 990 m | MPC; JPL |
| 236749 | 2007 LF_{26} | — | June 14, 2007 | Kitt Peak | Spacewatch | · | 2.3 km | MPC; JPL |
| 236750 | 2007 LJ_{26} | — | June 14, 2007 | Kitt Peak | Spacewatch | · | 1.5 km | MPC; JPL |
| 236751 | 2007 LU_{32} | — | June 14, 2007 | Kitt Peak | Spacewatch | · | 2.2 km | MPC; JPL |
| 236752 | 2007 LL_{36} | — | June 10, 2007 | Kitt Peak | Spacewatch | · | 6.0 km | MPC; JPL |
| 236753 | 2007 MJ | — | June 16, 2007 | Tiki | S. F. Hönig, Teamo, N. | · | 2.5 km | MPC; JPL |
| 236754 | 2007 MP_{1} | — | June 16, 2007 | Kitt Peak | Spacewatch | · | 7.6 km | MPC; JPL |
| 236755 | 2007 MY_{9} | — | June 20, 2007 | Kitt Peak | Spacewatch | · | 1.0 km | MPC; JPL |
| 236756 | 2007 MF_{21} | — | June 21, 2007 | Mount Lemmon | Mount Lemmon Survey | HYG | 3.1 km | MPC; JPL |
| 236757 | 2007 MB_{23} | — | June 22, 2007 | Kitt Peak | Spacewatch | · | 1.9 km | MPC; JPL |
| 236758 | 2007 NC_{3} | — | July 14, 2007 | Tiki | S. F. Hönig, Teamo, N. | · | 4.6 km | MPC; JPL |
| 236759 | 2007 NE_{4} | — | July 10, 2007 | Siding Spring | SSS | · | 2.1 km | MPC; JPL |
| 236760 | 2007 NF_{4} | — | July 10, 2007 | Siding Spring | SSS | MAR | 2.0 km | MPC; JPL |
| 236761 | 2007 NN_{4} | — | July 14, 2007 | Črni Vrh | Mikuž, H. | · | 5.8 km | MPC; JPL |
| 236762 | 2007 NT_{5} | — | July 15, 2007 | Siding Spring | SSS | · | 2.3 km | MPC; JPL |
| 236763 | 2007 OD_{1} | — | July 16, 2007 | Socorro | LINEAR | · | 3.2 km | MPC; JPL |
| 236764 | 2007 OJ_{1} | — | July 19, 2007 | La Sagra | OAM | · | 5.2 km | MPC; JPL |
| 236765 | 2007 OA_{2} | — | July 19, 2007 | La Sagra | OAM | · | 2.8 km | MPC; JPL |
| 236766 | 2007 OB_{3} | — | July 20, 2007 | Reedy Creek | J. Broughton | · | 2.0 km | MPC; JPL |
| 236767 | 2007 OP_{5} | — | July 21, 2007 | Lulin | LUSS | · | 3.5 km | MPC; JPL |
| 236768 | 2007 OJ_{6} | — | July 18, 2007 | Reedy Creek | J. Broughton | · | 1.2 km | MPC; JPL |
| 236769 | 2007 OR_{6} | — | July 21, 2007 | Reedy Creek | J. Broughton | (5) | 1.6 km | MPC; JPL |
| 236770 | 2007 ON_{7} | — | July 25, 2007 | Dauban | Chante-Perdrix | · | 1.7 km | MPC; JPL |
| 236771 | 2007 PU | — | August 4, 2007 | Reedy Creek | J. Broughton | MAS | 1.4 km | MPC; JPL |
| 236772 | 2007 PP_{2} | — | August 6, 2007 | Lulin | LUSS | · | 4.3 km | MPC; JPL |
| 236773 | 2007 PD_{5} | — | August 5, 2007 | Socorro | LINEAR | · | 1.3 km | MPC; JPL |
| 236774 | 2007 PE_{5} | — | August 5, 2007 | Socorro | LINEAR | MAS | 1.3 km | MPC; JPL |
| 236775 | 2007 PG_{5} | — | August 5, 2007 | Socorro | LINEAR | · | 6.8 km | MPC; JPL |
| 236776 | 2007 PH_{10} | — | August 9, 2007 | Socorro | LINEAR | MAS | 1.0 km | MPC; JPL |
| 236777 | 2007 PL_{10} | — | August 9, 2007 | Socorro | LINEAR | · | 2.6 km | MPC; JPL |
| 236778 | 2007 PP_{10} | — | August 9, 2007 | Socorro | LINEAR | · | 3.1 km | MPC; JPL |
| 236779 | 2007 PX_{11} | — | August 8, 2007 | Socorro | LINEAR | · | 1.7 km | MPC; JPL |
| 236780 | 2007 PY_{11} | — | August 9, 2007 | Kitt Peak | Spacewatch | · | 2.5 km | MPC; JPL |
| 236781 | 2007 PG_{15} | — | August 8, 2007 | Socorro | LINEAR | · | 1.8 km | MPC; JPL |
| 236782 | 2007 PD_{16} | — | August 8, 2007 | Socorro | LINEAR | · | 4.8 km | MPC; JPL |
| 236783 | 2007 PD_{20} | — | August 9, 2007 | Socorro | LINEAR | NYS | 1.8 km | MPC; JPL |
| 236784 Livorno | 2007 PU_{27} | Livorno | August 12, 2007 | San Marcello | L. Tesi, M. Mazzucato | · | 1.7 km | MPC; JPL |
| 236785 Hilendàrski | 2007 PN_{29} | Hilendàrski | August 15, 2007 | Plana | Fratev, F. | · | 1.6 km | MPC; JPL |
| 236786 | 2007 PN_{32} | — | August 8, 2007 | Socorro | LINEAR | · | 3.6 km | MPC; JPL |
| 236787 | 2007 PG_{33} | — | August 10, 2007 | Kitt Peak | Spacewatch | · | 3.9 km | MPC; JPL |
| 236788 Nanxinda | 2007 PM_{35} | Nanxinda | August 9, 2007 | Paoma Mountain | PMO NEO Survey Program | NYS | 1.5 km | MPC; JPL |
| 236789 | 2007 PY_{35} | — | August 12, 2007 | Socorro | LINEAR | EOS | 3.1 km | MPC; JPL |
| 236790 | 2007 PW_{38} | — | August 15, 2007 | Socorro | LINEAR | MAS | 1.4 km | MPC; JPL |
| 236791 | 2007 PU_{39} | — | August 13, 2007 | Socorro | LINEAR | · | 1.7 km | MPC; JPL |
| 236792 | 2007 PS_{40} | — | August 9, 2007 | Socorro | LINEAR | · | 6.3 km | MPC; JPL |
| 236793 | 2007 PW_{41} | — | August 6, 2007 | Lulin | LUSS | · | 2.4 km | MPC; JPL |
| 236794 | 2007 PZ_{41} | — | August 9, 2007 | Socorro | LINEAR | · | 970 m | MPC; JPL |
| 236795 | 2007 PQ_{42} | — | August 9, 2007 | Kitt Peak | Spacewatch | HOF | 4.4 km | MPC; JPL |
| 236796 | 2007 PC_{44} | — | August 13, 2007 | Socorro | LINEAR | URS | 5.3 km | MPC; JPL |
| 236797 | 2007 PE_{50} | — | August 11, 2007 | Socorro | LINEAR | · | 3.8 km | MPC; JPL |
| 236798 | 2007 PG_{50} | — | August 12, 2007 | Socorro | LINEAR | · | 3.0 km | MPC; JPL |
| 236799 | 2007 PO_{50} | — | August 10, 2007 | Kitt Peak | Spacewatch | · | 4.2 km | MPC; JPL |
| 236800 Broder | 2007 QU_{3} | Broder | August 24, 2007 | Wildberg | R. Apitzsch | · | 2.6 km | MPC; JPL |

== 236801–236900 ==
back to top

| Designation | | | Discovery | | | Properties | | Ref |
| Permanent | Provisional | Named after | Date | Site | Discoverer(s) | Category | Diam. | Ref |
|---|---|---|---|---|---|---|---|---|
| 236801 | 2007 QC_{4} | — | August 16, 2007 | Socorro | LINEAR | · | 1.6 km | MPC; JPL |
| 236802 | 2007 QT_{7} | — | August 21, 2007 | Anderson Mesa | LONEOS | · | 4.1 km | MPC; JPL |
| 236803 | 2007 QZ_{7} | — | August 21, 2007 | Anderson Mesa | LONEOS | HYG | 5.5 km | MPC; JPL |
| 236804 | 2007 QY_{8} | — | August 22, 2007 | Socorro | LINEAR | · | 2.9 km | MPC; JPL |
| 236805 | 2007 QP_{10} | — | August 23, 2007 | Kitt Peak | Spacewatch | KOR | 1.8 km | MPC; JPL |
| 236806 | 2007 RC_{2} | — | September 4, 2007 | Junk Bond | D. Healy | EOS | 2.7 km | MPC; JPL |
| 236807 Eggen | 2007 RH_{9} | Eggen | September 2, 2007 | Siding Spring | K. Sárneczky, L. Kiss | · | 1.6 km | MPC; JPL |
| 236808 | 2007 RX_{12} | — | September 11, 2007 | Vicques | M. Ory | · | 2.1 km | MPC; JPL |
| 236809 | 2007 RW_{13} | — | September 4, 2007 | La Sagra | OAM | · | 2.4 km | MPC; JPL |
| 236810 Rutten | 2007 RH_{14} | Rutten | September 9, 2007 | Wildberg | R. Apitzsch | · | 6.4 km | MPC; JPL |
| 236811 Natascharenate | 2007 RE_{16} | Natascharenate | September 12, 2007 | Gaisberg | Gierlinger, R. | VER | 3.4 km | MPC; JPL |
| 236812 | 2007 RS_{19} | — | September 14, 2007 | Desert Moon | Stevens, B. L. | HOF | 3.1 km | MPC; JPL |
| 236813 | 2007 RX_{20} | — | September 3, 2007 | Catalina | CSS | · | 5.5 km | MPC; JPL |
| 236814 | 2007 RL_{21} | — | September 3, 2007 | Catalina | CSS | THM | 2.8 km | MPC; JPL |
| 236815 | 2007 RY_{21} | — | September 3, 2007 | Catalina | CSS | NYS | 1.7 km | MPC; JPL |
| 236816 | 2007 RV_{25} | — | September 4, 2007 | Mount Lemmon | Mount Lemmon Survey | KOR | 1.4 km | MPC; JPL |
| 236817 | 2007 RC_{28} | — | September 4, 2007 | Catalina | CSS | TIR | 5.2 km | MPC; JPL |
| 236818 | 2007 RA_{33} | — | September 5, 2007 | Catalina | CSS | · | 2.1 km | MPC; JPL |
| 236819 | 2007 RC_{33} | — | September 5, 2007 | Anderson Mesa | LONEOS | T_{j} (2.98) · 3:2 | 7.7 km | MPC; JPL |
| 236820 | 2007 RK_{33} | — | September 5, 2007 | Catalina | CSS | · | 5.0 km | MPC; JPL |
| 236821 | 2007 RU_{38} | — | September 8, 2007 | Anderson Mesa | LONEOS | · | 4.9 km | MPC; JPL |
| 236822 | 2007 RW_{38} | — | September 8, 2007 | Anderson Mesa | LONEOS | 3:2 | 6.4 km | MPC; JPL |
| 236823 | 2007 RV_{42} | — | September 9, 2007 | Kitt Peak | Spacewatch | · | 5.4 km | MPC; JPL |
| 236824 | 2007 RQ_{47} | — | September 9, 2007 | Mount Lemmon | Mount Lemmon Survey | · | 3.2 km | MPC; JPL |
| 236825 | 2007 RS_{52} | — | September 9, 2007 | Kitt Peak | Spacewatch | ADE | 1.9 km | MPC; JPL |
| 236826 | 2007 RS_{53} | — | September 9, 2007 | Kitt Peak | Spacewatch | · | 2.9 km | MPC; JPL |
| 236827 | 2007 RN_{59} | — | September 10, 2007 | Kitt Peak | Spacewatch | · | 2.8 km | MPC; JPL |
| 236828 | 2007 RO_{61} | — | September 10, 2007 | Mount Lemmon | Mount Lemmon Survey | HOF | 3.5 km | MPC; JPL |
| 236829 | 2007 RM_{63} | — | September 10, 2007 | Mount Lemmon | Mount Lemmon Survey | · | 2.3 km | MPC; JPL |
| 236830 | 2007 RL_{67} | — | September 10, 2007 | Mount Lemmon | Mount Lemmon Survey | · | 4.8 km | MPC; JPL |
| 236831 | 2007 RE_{68} | — | September 10, 2007 | Kitt Peak | Spacewatch | · | 1.8 km | MPC; JPL |
| 236832 | 2007 RA_{78} | — | September 10, 2007 | Mount Lemmon | Mount Lemmon Survey | KOR | 1.9 km | MPC; JPL |
| 236833 | 2007 RB_{78} | — | September 10, 2007 | Mount Lemmon | Mount Lemmon Survey | · | 1.8 km | MPC; JPL |
| 236834 | 2007 RH_{78} | — | September 10, 2007 | Mount Lemmon | Mount Lemmon Survey | KOR | 1.6 km | MPC; JPL |
| 236835 | 2007 RA_{79} | — | September 10, 2007 | Mount Lemmon | Mount Lemmon Survey | · | 3.4 km | MPC; JPL |
| 236836 | 2007 RE_{79} | — | September 10, 2007 | Mount Lemmon | Mount Lemmon Survey | · | 4.5 km | MPC; JPL |
| 236837 | 2007 RG_{79} | — | September 10, 2007 | Mount Lemmon | Mount Lemmon Survey | · | 3.1 km | MPC; JPL |
| 236838 | 2007 RG_{80} | — | September 10, 2007 | Mount Lemmon | Mount Lemmon Survey | · | 2.6 km | MPC; JPL |
| 236839 | 2007 RN_{91} | — | September 10, 2007 | Mount Lemmon | Mount Lemmon Survey | · | 1.6 km | MPC; JPL |
| 236840 | 2007 RX_{95} | — | September 10, 2007 | Kitt Peak | Spacewatch | · | 2.1 km | MPC; JPL |
| 236841 | 2007 RO_{96} | — | September 10, 2007 | Kitt Peak | Spacewatch | VER | 3.4 km | MPC; JPL |
| 236842 | 2007 RF_{99} | — | September 11, 2007 | Kitt Peak | Spacewatch | · | 2.0 km | MPC; JPL |
| 236843 | 2007 RB_{112} | — | September 11, 2007 | Mount Lemmon | Mount Lemmon Survey | · | 3.6 km | MPC; JPL |
| 236844 | 2007 RD_{116} | — | September 11, 2007 | Kitt Peak | Spacewatch | HYG | 3.5 km | MPC; JPL |
| 236845 Houxianglin | 2007 RZ_{118} | Houxianglin | September 11, 2007 | XuYi | PMO NEO Survey Program | · | 2.9 km | MPC; JPL |
| 236846 | 2007 RW_{129} | — | September 12, 2007 | Mount Lemmon | Mount Lemmon Survey | · | 1.8 km | MPC; JPL |
| 236847 | 2007 RJ_{136} | — | September 14, 2007 | Mount Lemmon | Mount Lemmon Survey | · | 4.0 km | MPC; JPL |
| 236848 | 2007 RV_{137} | — | September 14, 2007 | Anderson Mesa | LONEOS | · | 2.0 km | MPC; JPL |
| 236849 | 2007 RK_{138} | — | September 14, 2007 | Lulin | LUSS | · | 3.9 km | MPC; JPL |
| 236850 | 2007 RV_{138} | — | September 15, 2007 | Lulin | LUSS | · | 3.0 km | MPC; JPL |
| 236851 Chenchikwan | 2007 RA_{139} | Chenchikwan | September 15, 2007 | Lulin | Lin, C.-S., Q. Ye | MIS | 3.3 km | MPC; JPL |
| 236852 | 2007 RV_{140} | — | September 13, 2007 | Socorro | LINEAR | 3:2 · SHU | 6.8 km | MPC; JPL |
| 236853 | 2007 RJ_{142} | — | September 13, 2007 | Socorro | LINEAR | · | 3.6 km | MPC; JPL |
| 236854 | 2007 RZ_{142} | — | September 14, 2007 | Socorro | LINEAR | · | 5.1 km | MPC; JPL |
| 236855 | 2007 RQ_{143} | — | September 14, 2007 | Socorro | LINEAR | HYG | 3.6 km | MPC; JPL |
| 236856 | 2007 RB_{157} | — | September 11, 2007 | Mount Lemmon | Mount Lemmon Survey | 3:2 · SHU | 7.2 km | MPC; JPL |
| 236857 | 2007 RM_{158} | — | September 12, 2007 | Catalina | CSS | HOF | 3.3 km | MPC; JPL |
| 236858 | 2007 RM_{180} | — | September 11, 2007 | Catalina | CSS | · | 2.1 km | MPC; JPL |
| 236859 | 2007 RD_{182} | — | September 12, 2007 | Mount Lemmon | Mount Lemmon Survey | · | 2.8 km | MPC; JPL |
| 236860 | 2007 RE_{187} | — | September 13, 2007 | Mount Lemmon | Mount Lemmon Survey | KON | 3.5 km | MPC; JPL |
| 236861 | 2007 RC_{188} | — | September 8, 2007 | Bergisch Gladbach | W. Bickel | 3:2 | 6.5 km | MPC; JPL |
| 236862 | 2007 RG_{189} | — | September 10, 2007 | Kitt Peak | Spacewatch | · | 2.5 km | MPC; JPL |
| 236863 | 2007 RD_{206} | — | September 10, 2007 | Mount Lemmon | Mount Lemmon Survey | THM | 2.8 km | MPC; JPL |
| 236864 | 2007 RK_{209} | — | September 10, 2007 | Kitt Peak | Spacewatch | · | 3.5 km | MPC; JPL |
| 236865 | 2007 RA_{211} | — | September 11, 2007 | Kitt Peak | Spacewatch | · | 2.2 km | MPC; JPL |
| 236866 | 2007 RR_{216} | — | September 13, 2007 | Catalina | CSS | EOS | 3.2 km | MPC; JPL |
| 236867 | 2007 RK_{223} | — | September 8, 2007 | Anderson Mesa | LONEOS | · | 4.5 km | MPC; JPL |
| 236868 | 2007 RG_{226} | — | September 10, 2007 | Kitt Peak | Spacewatch | · | 1.4 km | MPC; JPL |
| 236869 | 2007 RQ_{227} | — | September 10, 2007 | Mount Lemmon | Mount Lemmon Survey | · | 4.5 km | MPC; JPL |
| 236870 | 2007 RB_{242} | — | September 14, 2007 | Socorro | LINEAR | EUN | 1.5 km | MPC; JPL |
| 236871 | 2007 RP_{242} | — | September 15, 2007 | Socorro | LINEAR | NYS | 1.2 km | MPC; JPL |
| 236872 | 2007 RR_{253} | — | September 14, 2007 | Kitt Peak | Spacewatch | · | 2.8 km | MPC; JPL |
| 236873 | 2007 RA_{262} | — | September 14, 2007 | Kitt Peak | Spacewatch | · | 5.0 km | MPC; JPL |
| 236874 | 2007 RT_{263} | — | September 15, 2007 | Anderson Mesa | LONEOS | MAS | 1.1 km | MPC; JPL |
| 236875 | 2007 RQ_{277} | — | September 5, 2007 | Catalina | CSS | CYB | 6.2 km | MPC; JPL |
| 236876 | 2007 RD_{280} | — | September 11, 2007 | Siding Spring | SSS | fast | 2.5 km | MPC; JPL |
| 236877 | 2007 RH_{281} | — | September 13, 2007 | Catalina | CSS | CYB | 6.3 km | MPC; JPL |
| 236878 | 2007 RJ_{283} | — | September 11, 2007 | Catalina | CSS | L4 | 13 km | MPC; JPL |
| 236879 | 2007 RU_{285} | — | September 14, 2007 | Catalina | CSS | · | 3.2 km | MPC; JPL |
| 236880 | 2007 RQ_{286} | — | September 4, 2007 | Mount Lemmon | Mount Lemmon Survey | · | 2.3 km | MPC; JPL |
| 236881 | 2007 RL_{288} | — | September 12, 2007 | Catalina | CSS | · | 1.9 km | MPC; JPL |
| 236882 | 2007 RN_{291} | — | September 12, 2007 | Kitt Peak | Spacewatch | · | 2.6 km | MPC; JPL |
| 236883 | 2007 RS_{301} | — | September 14, 2007 | Mount Lemmon | Mount Lemmon Survey | · | 2.5 km | MPC; JPL |
| 236884 | 2007 SD_{2} | — | September 19, 2007 | Dauban | Chante-Perdrix | HIL · 3:2 | 7.2 km | MPC; JPL |
| 236885 | 2007 SZ_{2} | — | September 16, 2007 | Socorro | LINEAR | MAR | 1.5 km | MPC; JPL |
| 236886 | 2007 SR_{3} | — | September 16, 2007 | Socorro | LINEAR | · | 6.7 km | MPC; JPL |
| 236887 | 2007 SP_{5} | — | September 19, 2007 | Socorro | LINEAR | · | 2.3 km | MPC; JPL |
| 236888 | 2007 SQ_{5} | — | September 19, 2007 | Socorro | LINEAR | · | 5.7 km | MPC; JPL |
| 236889 | 2007 SU_{5} | — | September 19, 2007 | Socorro | LINEAR | HYG | 3.8 km | MPC; JPL |
| 236890 | 2007 SY_{11} | — | September 22, 2007 | Črni Vrh | Matičič, S. | · | 4.0 km | MPC; JPL |
| 236891 | 2007 SO_{12} | — | September 18, 2007 | Catalina | CSS | · | 4.5 km | MPC; JPL |
| 236892 | 2007 TJ_{7} | — | October 7, 2007 | Pla D'Arguines | R. Ferrando | · | 4.1 km | MPC; JPL |
| 236893 | 2007 TT_{9} | — | October 6, 2007 | Socorro | LINEAR | · | 5.8 km | MPC; JPL |
| 236894 | 2007 TN_{14} | — | October 7, 2007 | Altschwendt | W. Ries | 3:2 | 5.2 km | MPC; JPL |
| 236895 | 2007 TZ_{16} | — | October 7, 2007 | Calvin-Rehoboth | Calvin College | · | 3.3 km | MPC; JPL |
| 236896 | 2007 TH_{17} | — | October 7, 2007 | Calvin-Rehoboth | Calvin College | VER | 3.3 km | MPC; JPL |
| 236897 | 2007 TU_{17} | — | October 7, 2007 | Dauban | Chante-Perdrix | EOS | 3.2 km | MPC; JPL |
| 236898 | 2007 TF_{21} | — | October 9, 2007 | Dauban | Chante-Perdrix | · | 2.9 km | MPC; JPL |
| 236899 | 2007 TF_{30} | — | October 4, 2007 | Kitt Peak | Spacewatch | · | 5.5 km | MPC; JPL |
| 236900 | 2007 TB_{31} | — | October 4, 2007 | Kitt Peak | Spacewatch | · | 3.5 km | MPC; JPL |

== 236901–237000 ==
back to top

| Designation | | | Discovery | | | Properties | | Ref |
| Permanent | Provisional | Named after | Date | Site | Discoverer(s) | Category | Diam. | Ref |
|---|---|---|---|---|---|---|---|---|
| 236901 | 2007 TX_{31} | — | October 5, 2007 | Siding Spring | SSS | · | 4.0 km | MPC; JPL |
| 236902 | 2007 TK_{32} | — | October 6, 2007 | Kitt Peak | Spacewatch | · | 1.4 km | MPC; JPL |
| 236903 | 2007 TR_{54} | — | October 4, 2007 | Kitt Peak | Spacewatch | · | 2.6 km | MPC; JPL |
| 236904 | 2007 TF_{55} | — | October 4, 2007 | Kitt Peak | Spacewatch | · | 3.0 km | MPC; JPL |
| 236905 | 2007 TK_{65} | — | October 7, 2007 | Mount Lemmon | Mount Lemmon Survey | · | 3.1 km | MPC; JPL |
| 236906 | 2007 TN_{65} | — | October 7, 2007 | Mount Lemmon | Mount Lemmon Survey | · | 3.7 km | MPC; JPL |
| 236907 | 2007 TR_{67} | — | October 8, 2007 | Goodricke-Pigott | R. A. Tucker | · | 3.3 km | MPC; JPL |
| 236908 | 2007 TO_{92} | — | October 5, 2007 | Kitt Peak | Spacewatch | HOF | 3.3 km | MPC; JPL |
| 236909 Jakoberwin | 2007 TX_{95} | Jakoberwin | October 7, 2007 | Gaisberg | Gierlinger, R. | · | 2.9 km | MPC; JPL |
| 236910 | 2007 TP_{97} | — | October 8, 2007 | Anderson Mesa | LONEOS | · | 3.9 km | MPC; JPL |
| 236911 | 2007 TX_{99} | — | October 8, 2007 | Kitt Peak | Spacewatch | · | 4.9 km | MPC; JPL |
| 236912 | 2007 TE_{108} | — | October 7, 2007 | Mount Lemmon | Mount Lemmon Survey | · | 4.1 km | MPC; JPL |
| 236913 | 2007 TJ_{111} | — | October 8, 2007 | Catalina | CSS | EMA | 6.7 km | MPC; JPL |
| 236914 | 2007 TJ_{120} | — | October 9, 2007 | Lulin | LUSS | · | 3.1 km | MPC; JPL |
| 236915 | 2007 TL_{124} | — | October 6, 2007 | Kitt Peak | Spacewatch | · | 2.7 km | MPC; JPL |
| 236916 | 2007 TT_{124} | — | October 6, 2007 | Kitt Peak | Spacewatch | AGN | 1.7 km | MPC; JPL |
| 236917 | 2007 TT_{137} | — | October 8, 2007 | Catalina | CSS | · | 3.1 km | MPC; JPL |
| 236918 | 2007 TM_{142} | — | October 13, 2007 | Dauban | Chante-Perdrix | · | 2.5 km | MPC; JPL |
| 236919 | 2007 TT_{144} | — | October 6, 2007 | Socorro | LINEAR | THM | 3.0 km | MPC; JPL |
| 236920 | 2007 TO_{145} | — | October 6, 2007 | Socorro | LINEAR | · | 1.9 km | MPC; JPL |
| 236921 | 2007 TE_{146} | — | October 6, 2007 | Socorro | LINEAR | EOS | 2.6 km | MPC; JPL |
| 236922 | 2007 TA_{154} | — | October 9, 2007 | Socorro | LINEAR | EOS | 3.2 km | MPC; JPL |
| 236923 | 2007 TJ_{155} | — | October 9, 2007 | Socorro | LINEAR | · | 4.8 km | MPC; JPL |
| 236924 | 2007 TS_{160} | — | October 9, 2007 | Socorro | LINEAR | · | 3.4 km | MPC; JPL |
| 236925 | 2007 TH_{165} | — | October 11, 2007 | Socorro | LINEAR | T_{j} (2.99) · 3:2 · SHU | 7.0 km | MPC; JPL |
| 236926 | 2007 TP_{189} | — | October 4, 2007 | Mount Lemmon | Mount Lemmon Survey | · | 3.0 km | MPC; JPL |
| 236927 | 2007 TC_{194} | — | October 7, 2007 | Catalina | CSS | · | 4.1 km | MPC; JPL |
| 236928 | 2007 TW_{194} | — | October 7, 2007 | Mount Lemmon | Mount Lemmon Survey | · | 2.3 km | MPC; JPL |
| 236929 | 2007 TN_{205} | — | October 9, 2007 | Mount Lemmon | Mount Lemmon Survey | · | 2.6 km | MPC; JPL |
| 236930 | 2007 TS_{207} | — | October 10, 2007 | Mount Lemmon | Mount Lemmon Survey | MRX | 1.4 km | MPC; JPL |
| 236931 | 2007 TF_{209} | — | October 11, 2007 | Catalina | CSS | · | 1.8 km | MPC; JPL |
| 236932 | 2007 TM_{210} | — | October 6, 2007 | Kitt Peak | Spacewatch | ARM | 5.6 km | MPC; JPL |
| 236933 | 2007 TF_{219} | — | October 8, 2007 | Mount Lemmon | Mount Lemmon Survey | EOS | 2.6 km | MPC; JPL |
| 236934 | 2007 TE_{233} | — | October 8, 2007 | Kitt Peak | Spacewatch | · | 4.2 km | MPC; JPL |
| 236935 | 2007 TE_{254} | — | October 8, 2007 | Mount Lemmon | Mount Lemmon Survey | · | 4.8 km | MPC; JPL |
| 236936 | 2007 TK_{263} | — | October 10, 2007 | Kitt Peak | Spacewatch | KOR | 2.0 km | MPC; JPL |
| 236937 | 2007 TF_{275} | — | October 11, 2007 | Catalina | CSS | · | 3.6 km | MPC; JPL |
| 236938 | 2007 TC_{281} | — | October 7, 2007 | Mount Lemmon | Mount Lemmon Survey | · | 2.3 km | MPC; JPL |
| 236939 | 2007 TQ_{287} | — | October 11, 2007 | Catalina | CSS | · | 5.6 km | MPC; JPL |
| 236940 | 2007 TK_{291} | — | October 13, 2007 | Catalina | CSS | WIT | 1.5 km | MPC; JPL |
| 236941 | 2007 TM_{297} | — | October 11, 2007 | Mount Lemmon | Mount Lemmon Survey | ADE | 2.2 km | MPC; JPL |
| 236942 | 2007 TD_{322} | — | October 10, 2007 | Lulin | LUSS | · | 4.1 km | MPC; JPL |
| 236943 | 2007 TB_{332} | — | October 11, 2007 | Kitt Peak | Spacewatch | HYG | 4.0 km | MPC; JPL |
| 236944 | 2007 TA_{353} | — | October 8, 2007 | Mount Lemmon | Mount Lemmon Survey | · | 2.6 km | MPC; JPL |
| 236945 | 2007 TE_{353} | — | October 8, 2007 | Mount Lemmon | Mount Lemmon Survey | · | 5.6 km | MPC; JPL |
| 236946 | 2007 TL_{365} | — | October 9, 2007 | Mount Lemmon | Mount Lemmon Survey | · | 1.7 km | MPC; JPL |
| 236947 | 2007 TO_{374} | — | October 15, 2007 | Kitt Peak | Spacewatch | MRX | 1.4 km | MPC; JPL |
| 236948 | 2007 TP_{385} | — | October 15, 2007 | Catalina | CSS | · | 3.7 km | MPC; JPL |
| 236949 | 2007 TZ_{399} | — | October 15, 2007 | Kitt Peak | Spacewatch | · | 2.6 km | MPC; JPL |
| 236950 | 2007 TF_{411} | — | October 13, 2007 | Catalina | CSS | · | 2.7 km | MPC; JPL |
| 236951 | 2007 TD_{419} | — | October 10, 2007 | Catalina | CSS | · | 3.9 km | MPC; JPL |
| 236952 | 2007 UW_{9} | — | October 17, 2007 | Anderson Mesa | LONEOS | · | 4.0 km | MPC; JPL |
| 236953 | 2007 UF_{14} | — | October 16, 2007 | Kitt Peak | Spacewatch | · | 4.5 km | MPC; JPL |
| 236954 | 2007 UP_{21} | — | October 16, 2007 | Kitt Peak | Spacewatch | · | 3.0 km | MPC; JPL |
| 236955 | 2007 UG_{23} | — | October 16, 2007 | Kitt Peak | Spacewatch | EOS | 3.0 km | MPC; JPL |
| 236956 | 2007 UN_{26} | — | October 16, 2007 | Mount Lemmon | Mount Lemmon Survey | KOR | 2.0 km | MPC; JPL |
| 236957 | 2007 UF_{34} | — | October 17, 2007 | Anderson Mesa | LONEOS | HYG | 3.8 km | MPC; JPL |
| 236958 | 2007 UT_{38} | — | October 20, 2007 | Catalina | CSS | · | 2.6 km | MPC; JPL |
| 236959 | 2007 US_{59} | — | October 30, 2007 | Mount Lemmon | Mount Lemmon Survey | · | 3.5 km | MPC; JPL |
| 236960 | 2007 UX_{74} | — | October 31, 2007 | Mount Lemmon | Mount Lemmon Survey | · | 3.3 km | MPC; JPL |
| 236961 | 2007 UU_{98} | — | October 30, 2007 | Kitt Peak | Spacewatch | · | 2.4 km | MPC; JPL |
| 236962 | 2007 UD_{99} | — | October 30, 2007 | Kitt Peak | Spacewatch | · | 3.5 km | MPC; JPL |
| 236963 | 2007 UF_{105} | — | October 30, 2007 | Kitt Peak | Spacewatch | · | 3.9 km | MPC; JPL |
| 236964 | 2007 UX_{118} | — | October 31, 2007 | Kitt Peak | Spacewatch | · | 3.2 km | MPC; JPL |
| 236965 | 2007 VZ_{73} | — | November 3, 2007 | Kitt Peak | Spacewatch | · | 2.9 km | MPC; JPL |
| 236966 | 2007 VO_{89} | — | November 4, 2007 | Socorro | LINEAR | LUT | 5.4 km | MPC; JPL |
| 236967 | 2007 VG_{114} | — | November 3, 2007 | Kitt Peak | Spacewatch | · | 4.4 km | MPC; JPL |
| 236968 | 2007 VD_{180} | — | November 7, 2007 | Mount Lemmon | Mount Lemmon Survey | · | 3.3 km | MPC; JPL |
| 236969 | 2007 VU_{234} | — | November 9, 2007 | Kitt Peak | Spacewatch | · | 3.6 km | MPC; JPL |
| 236970 | 2007 XB_{3} | — | December 3, 2007 | Catalina | CSS | VER | 6.7 km | MPC; JPL |
| 236971 | 2007 XC_{18} | — | December 12, 2007 | Great Shefford | Birtwhistle, P. | HOF | 4.4 km | MPC; JPL |
| 236972 | 2008 AV_{3} | — | January 5, 2008 | Bisei SG Center | BATTeRS | · | 7.0 km | MPC; JPL |
| 236973 | 2008 CK_{157} | — | February 9, 2008 | Catalina | CSS | 3:2 | 8.0 km | MPC; JPL |
| 236974 | 2008 EK_{137} | — | March 11, 2008 | Kitt Peak | Spacewatch | L5 | 11 km | MPC; JPL |
| 236975 | 2008 HG_{22} | — | April 26, 2008 | Kitt Peak | Spacewatch | · | 2.9 km | MPC; JPL |
| 236976 | 2008 JA_{15} | — | May 6, 2008 | Dauban | Kugel, F. | H | 940 m | MPC; JPL |
| 236977 | 2008 ND_{5} | — | July 10, 2008 | Siding Spring | SSS | · | 6.3 km | MPC; JPL |
| 236978 | 2008 OG_{3} | — | July 27, 2008 | Bisei SG Center | BATTeRS | · | 1.7 km | MPC; JPL |
| 236979 | 2008 OQ_{7} | — | July 29, 2008 | Mount Lemmon | Mount Lemmon Survey | · | 2.1 km | MPC; JPL |
| 236980 | 2008 OT_{9} | — | July 31, 2008 | La Sagra | OAM | H | 1.1 km | MPC; JPL |
| 236981 | 2008 OG_{12} | — | July 27, 2008 | La Sagra | OAM | · | 960 m | MPC; JPL |
| 236982 | 2008 OY_{12} | — | July 29, 2008 | La Sagra | OAM | · | 3.9 km | MPC; JPL |
| 236983 | 2008 OJ_{25} | — | July 30, 2008 | Kitt Peak | Spacewatch | · | 2.3 km | MPC; JPL |
| 236984 Astier | 2008 PP_{21} | Astier | August 4, 2008 | Eygalayes | Sogorb, P. | · | 950 m | MPC; JPL |
| 236985 | 2008 PA_{22} | — | August 4, 2008 | La Sagra | OAM | PAD | 4.2 km | MPC; JPL |
| 236986 | 2008 QU_{9} | — | August 26, 2008 | La Sagra | OAM | LUT | 5.1 km | MPC; JPL |
| 236987 Deustua | 2008 QX_{9} | Deustua | August 26, 2008 | La Sagra | OAM | MAS | 960 m | MPC; JPL |
| 236988 Robberto | 2008 QE_{12} | Robberto | August 25, 2008 | La Sagra | OAM | NYS | 1.3 km | MPC; JPL |
| 236989 | 2008 QW_{44} | — | August 24, 2008 | Socorro | LINEAR | · | 1.1 km | MPC; JPL |
| 236990 | 2008 QH_{46} | — | August 24, 2008 | Socorro | LINEAR | · | 1.5 km | MPC; JPL |
| 236991 | 2008 RM_{4} | — | September 2, 2008 | Kitt Peak | Spacewatch | · | 1.3 km | MPC; JPL |
| 236992 | 2008 RF_{9} | — | September 3, 2008 | Kitt Peak | Spacewatch | · | 3.2 km | MPC; JPL |
| 236993 | 2008 RC_{10} | — | September 3, 2008 | Kitt Peak | Spacewatch | THM | 3.3 km | MPC; JPL |
| 236994 | 2008 RT_{10} | — | September 3, 2008 | Kitt Peak | Spacewatch | MAS | 880 m | MPC; JPL |
| 236995 | 2008 RW_{15} | — | September 4, 2008 | Kitt Peak | Spacewatch | LIX | 6.1 km | MPC; JPL |
| 236996 | 2008 RB_{23} | — | September 4, 2008 | Socorro | LINEAR | GEF | 1.6 km | MPC; JPL |
| 236997 | 2008 RE_{24} | — | September 5, 2008 | Socorro | LINEAR | ADE | 4.2 km | MPC; JPL |
| 236998 | 2008 RG_{35} | — | September 2, 2008 | Kitt Peak | Spacewatch | · | 1.2 km | MPC; JPL |
| 236999 | 2008 RQ_{39} | — | September 2, 2008 | Kitt Peak | Spacewatch | · | 780 m | MPC; JPL |
| 237000 | 2008 RM_{41} | — | September 2, 2008 | Kitt Peak | Spacewatch | · | 960 m | MPC; JPL |

back to top

== See also ==
- Meanings of minor-planet names: 236001–237000
