= UAI =

UAI may refer to:

- Union Académique Internationale, French for International Union of Academies
- Universities Admission Index, a system used for Australian university entrance
- Union astronomique internationale, the French name for the International Astronomical Union
- Unione Astrofili Italiani, the Italian Amateur Astronomers Union
- Universal Armament Interface
- Universidad Adolfo Ibáñez, Spanish for Adolfo Ibáñez University
- Universidad Abierta Interamericana, Spanish for Interamerican Open University
- Unprotected Anal Intercourse
- Uruguayan Antarctic Institute
- Uncertainty avoidance index, the amount of tolerance of unpredictability
