= Antarkos I =

Uruguayan Air Force lands in King George Island for the first time, january 1984.

In December 1984 Antarkos I, the first Uruguayan Antarctic expedition, arrived in King George Island in order to establish a permanent base on the Antarctic Continent.

It was a scientific and logistic exercise supported by the Uruguayan Antarctic Institute and was led by Lt. Col Omar Porciúncula who was in charge to organize all the foundational works for the future Artigas Base.
