= Meanings of minor-planet names: 234001–235000 =

As minor planet discoveries are confirmed, they are given a permanent number by the IAU's Minor Planet Center (MPC), and the discoverers can then submit names for them, following the IAU's naming conventions. The list below concerns those minor planets in the specified number-range that have received names, and explains the meanings of those names.

Official naming citations of newly named small Solar System bodies are approved and published in a bulletin by IAU's Working Group for Small Bodies Nomenclature (WGSBN). Before May 2021, citations were published in MPC's Minor Planet Circulars for many decades. Recent citations can also be found on the JPL Small-Body Database (SBDB). Until his death in 2016, German astronomer Lutz D. Schmadel compiled these citations into the Dictionary of Minor Planet Names (DMP) and regularly updated the collection.

Based on Paul Herget's The Names of the Minor Planets, Schmadel also researched the unclear origin of numerous asteroids, most of which had been named prior to World War II. This article incorporates text from this source, which is in the public domain: SBDB New namings may only be added to this list below after official publication as the preannouncement of names is condemned. The WGSBN publishes a comprehensive guideline for the naming rules of non-cometary small Solar System bodies.

== 234001–234100 ==
Named minor planet	Provisional	This minor planet was named for...	Ref · Catalog
234026 Unioneastrofili	1998 SJ_{35}	The Italian Amateur Astronomers Union (Italian: Unione Astrofili Italiani; UAI). It was founded in 1967, and counts over 1000 members and releases the peer-reviewed magazine Astronomia. The UAI has many research sections and undertakes scientific popularization and didactics, with the co-operation of the Ministry of Education and Universities.	JPL · 234026

== 234101–234200 ==
back to top

Named minor planet	Provisional	This minor planet was named for...	Ref · Catalog
There are no named minor planets in this number range

== 234201–234300 ==
back to top

Named minor planet	Provisional	This minor planet was named for...	Ref · Catalog
234292 Wolfganghansch	2000 YL_{8}	Wolfgang Hansch (born 1954), a German geologist, editor and lecturer, who is the founder and managing director of the science center experimenta gGmbH in Heilbronn, Germany.	IAU · 234292
234294 Pappsándor	2000 YD_{32}	Sándor Papp (born 1949) is a Hungarian amateur astronomer, who has made more than 100,000 visual brightness estimation of variable stars.	JPL · 234294

== 234301–234400 ==
back to top

Named minor planet	Provisional	This minor planet was named for...	Ref · Catalog
There are no named minor planets in this number range

== 234401–234500 ==
back to top

Named minor planet	Provisional	This minor planet was named for...	Ref · Catalog
There are no named minor planets in this number range

== 234501–234600 ==
back to top

Named minor planet	Provisional	This minor planet was named for...	Ref · Catalog
There are no named minor planets in this number range

== 234601–234700 ==
back to top

Named minor planet	Provisional	This minor planet was named for...	Ref · Catalog
There are no named minor planets in this number range

== 234701–234800 ==
back to top

Named minor planet	Provisional	This minor planet was named for...	Ref · Catalog
234750 Amymainzer	2002 NX_{69}	Amy Mainzer (born 1974) is an American astronomer and member of the Wide-field Infrared Survey Explorer (WISE) team. She was the principal investigator of a project to enhance WISE's ability to find new minor planets. The name was suggested by H. Bill.	JPL · 234750
234761 Rainerkracht	2002 OU_{32}	Rainer Kracht (born 1948), is a German amateur astronomer who discovered more than two hundred comets on images taken by the SOHO spacecraft. The Kracht group comets are named after him. Kracht is also a discoverer of minor planets. The name was suggested by H. Bill.	JPL · 234761

== 234801–234900 ==
back to top

Named minor planet	Provisional	This minor planet was named for...	Ref · Catalog
There are no named minor planets in this number range

== 234901–235000 ==
back to top

Named minor planet	Provisional	This minor planet was named for...	Ref · Catalog
234923 Bonnell	2002 TR_{382}	Jerry T. Bonnell (b. 1954), an American astrophysicist.	IAU · 234923

back to top

Preceded by 233,001–234,000	Meanings of minor-planet names List of minor planets: 234,001–235,000	Succeeded by 235,001–236,000
