= Amy Mainzer =

American astronomer

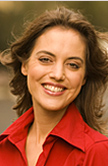
- Born: January 2, 1974 (age 52); Mansfield, Ohio
- Education: Stanford University; California Institute of Technology; University of California, Los Angeles
- Known for: Astrophysical instrumentation and infrared astronomy
- Scientific career
- Fields: Astrophysics
- Workplaces: University of Arizona Lunar and Planetary Laboratory

Amy Mainzer (born January 2, 1974) is an American astronomer, specializing in astrophysical instrumentation and infrared astronomy. She was the deputy project scientist for the Wide-field Infrared Survey Explorer and is the principal investigator for its NEOWISE extension to study minor planets and for the future Near Earth Object Surveyor space telescope mission.

She also hosted segments for and served as science curriculum consultant and executive producer for the PBS Kids series Ready Jet Go!

== Life ==
Mainzer received a B.Sc. in physics from Stanford University with honors (1996), an M.Sc. in astronomy from California Institute of Technology (2000), and a Ph.D. in astronomy from the University of California, Los Angeles (2003).

Her research interests include asteroids, brown dwarfs, planetary atmospheres, debris disks, star formation, and the design and construction of new ground- and space-based instrumentation.

She appears in several episodes of the History Channel series The Universe. She also appears in the documentary featurette "Stellar Cartography: On Earth" included on the Star Trek Generations home video release (March 2010). Mainzer is also in the 2016 documentary about the life of Leonard Nimoy and the effect of Spock on popular culture called "For the Love of Spock", which was directed by Leonard Nimoy's son Adam Nimoy. She serves as the science consultant and host for the live-action interstitials on the PBS Kids series Ready Jet Go!. She was the science advisor for the 2021 Netflix film Don't Look Up. She co-hosts the podcast Unobtainium.

== Awards and honors ==
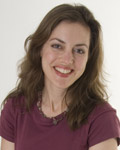
Amy Mainzer

- NASA Exceptional Scientific Achievement Medal (2012)
- NASA Exceptional Achievement Medal (2011)
- Numerous group achievement awards for Spitzer, WISE, NEOWISE
- Lew Allen Award for Excellence (2010)
- NASA Graduate Student Research Program Fellowship (2001–2003)
- National Science Foundation Graduate Research Fellowship (1996–1999)
- Fellow of the American Astronomical Society (2025)

=== Asteroid ===
Asteroid 234750 Amymainzer, discovered by astronomers of the NEAT program at Palomar Observatory in 2002, was named after her. The official naming citation was published by the Minor Planet Center on 26 July 2010 (M.P.C. 71353).

== Select publications ==
- Edward L. Wright; Peter R. M. Eisenhardt; Amy K. Mainzer; et al. (November 9, 2010). "The wide-field infrared survey explorer (WISE): mission description and initial on-orbit performance". The Astronomical Journal. 140 (6): 1868–1881. arXiv:1008.0031. Bibcode:2010AJ....140.1868W. doi:10.1088/0004-6256/140/6/1868. ISSN 0004-6256. Wikidata Q59759296.
- T. H. Jarrett; M. Cohen; F. Masci; et al. (June 23, 2011). "The Spitzer-WISE survey of the ecliptic poles". The Astrophysical Journal. 735 (2): 112. Bibcode:2011ApJ...735..112J. doi:10.1088/0004-637x/735/2/112. ISSN 0004-637X. Wikidata Q59246117.
- Michael C. Cushing; J. Davy Kirkpatrick; Christopher R. Gelino; et al. (November 22, 2011). "The discovery of Y dwarfs using data from the Wide-field Infrared Survey Explorer (WISE)". The Astrophysical Journal. 743 (1): 50. arXiv:1108.4678. Bibcode:2011ApJ...743...50C. doi:10.1088/0004-637x/743/1/50. ISSN 0004-637X. Wikidata Q56423853.

== See also ==
- List of women in leadership positions on astronomical instrumentation projects
