= Uruguayan Antarctica =

Uruguayan Antarctica Antártida Uruguaya
- Proposed territory
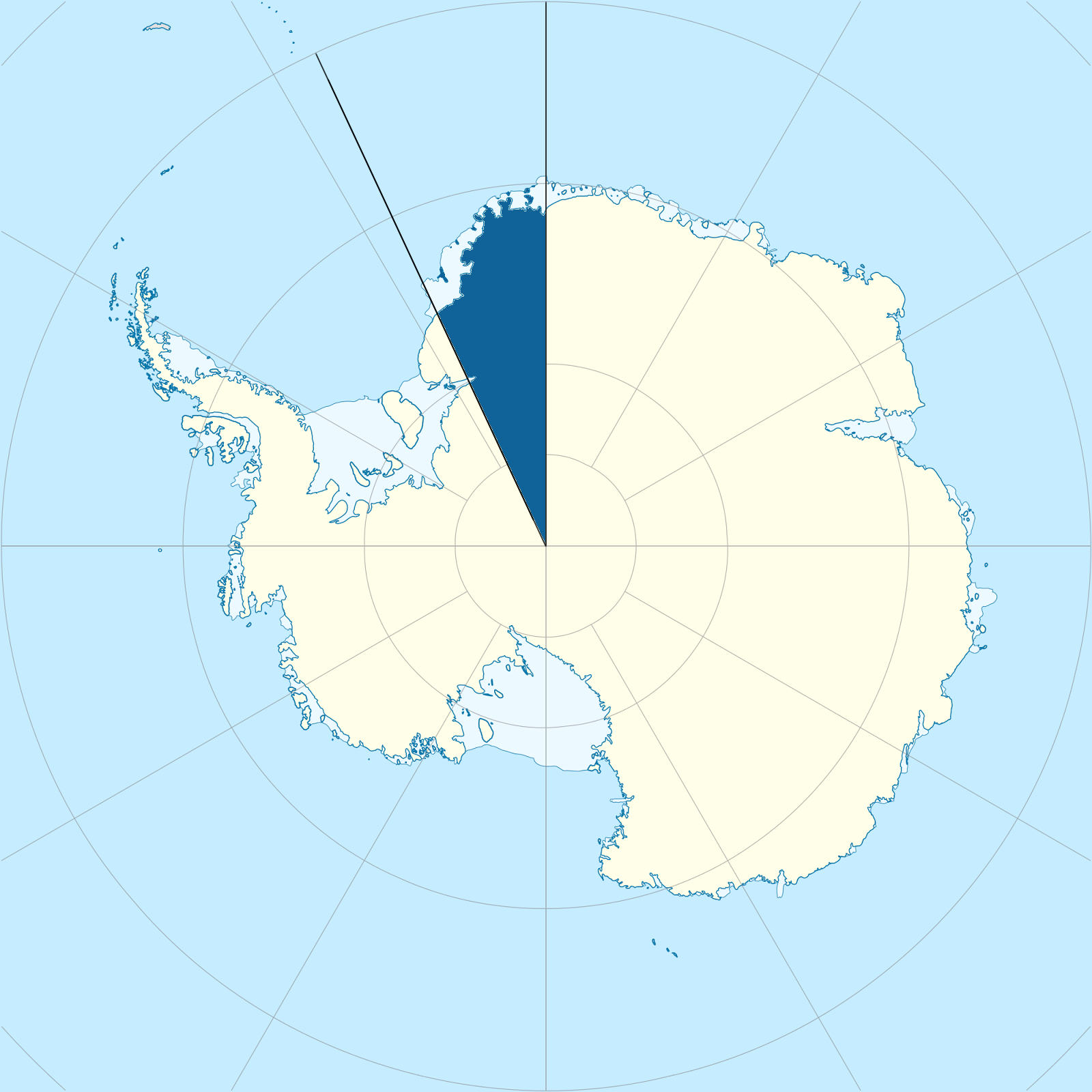
- Proposed claim on 1973 (overlapping with the Norwegian and British claims); Coordinates: 0°W 25°W

Uruguayan flags in Artigas Base.

Uruguayan Antarctica (Spanish: Antártida Uruguaya) is the sector of Antarctica where Professor Julio César Musso believes the Oriental Republic of Uruguay should exercise its sovereignty. It was not assigned a specific definition nor meant a territorial claim, but rather was intended as an area of natural action of the southern maritime projection of Uruguay. Uruguay is part of the Antarctic Treaty System as a consulting member, and it reserved the right to make a territorial claim.

== Uruguayan Antarctica Day ==
=== Bill of 1985 ===
On May 8, 1985, then-Senator Luis Alberto Lacalle introduced a new bill in order to point a day in the year as the "Uruguayan Antarctica Day" (Día de la Antártida Uruguaya) and promote the study and dissemination of the issue among the younger generations. In the preamble, Lacalle argued that "we have chosen the 28th of August, as the foundation of the Uruguayan Antarctic Institute, inspired by the teachings of Professor Julio C. Musso, has been the area where the Antarctic vocation of our country was born and raised."

== See also ==
- Uruguayan Antarctic Institute
- Brazilian Antarctica
