= Italian Amateur Astronomers Union =

The Italian Amateur Astronomers Union (Italian: Unione Astrofili Italiani; Unione degli Astrofili Italiani; UAI), also known as Union of Italian Amateur Astronomers, is an Italian organization active in astronomy research and outreach that was founded in 1967. Its members are both professional and amateur astronomers. The UAI claims more than two thousands members from the whole Italy and is one of the most important amateur astronomical associations in Europe.

The main-belt asteroid 234026 Unioneastrofili, discovered by Luciano Tesi in 1998, was named in honor of the organization.
