= List of minor planets: 234001–235000 =

The following is a partial list of minor planets, running from minor-planet number 234001 through 235000, inclusive. The primary data for this and other partial lists is based on JPL's "Small-Body Orbital Elements" and data available from the Minor Planet Center. Critical list information is also provided by the MPC, unless otherwise specified from Lowell Observatory. A detailed description of the table's columns and additional sources are given on the main page including a complete list of every page in this series, and a statistical break-up on the dynamical classification of minor planets.

Also see the summary list of all named bodies in numerical and alphabetical order, and the corresponding naming citations for the number range of this particular list. New namings may only be added to this list after official publication, as the preannouncement of names is condemned by the Working Group for Small Bodies Nomenclature of the International Astronomical Union.

Near-Earth obj.	MBA (inner)	MBA (outer)	Centaur
Mars-crosser	MBA (middle)	Jupiter trojan	Trans-Neptunian obj.
Unclassified

== 234001–234100 ==
Designation			Discovery			Properties		Ref
Permanent	Provisional	Named after	Date	Site	Discoverer(s)	Category	Diam.	Ref
234001	1997 AQ_{20}	—	January 11, 1997	Kitt Peak	Spacewatch	·	2.1 km	MPC · JPL
234002	1997 CG_{11}	—	February 3, 1997	Kitt Peak	Spacewatch	(5)	1.3 km	MPC · JPL
234003	1997 CR_{11}	—	February 3, 1997	Kitt Peak	Spacewatch	ADE	2.6 km	MPC · JPL
234004	1997 EJ_{3}	—	March 2, 1997	Kitt Peak	Spacewatch	·	950 m	MPC · JPL
234005	1997 ER_{28}	—	March 10, 1997	Kitt Peak	Spacewatch	·	1.6 km	MPC · JPL
234006	1997 EW_{30}	—	March 5, 1997	Kitt Peak	Spacewatch	HOF	4.1 km	MPC · JPL
234007	1997 ES_{31}	—	March 10, 1997	Kitt Peak	Spacewatch	·	830 m	MPC · JPL
234008	1997 EL_{32}	—	March 11, 1997	Kitt Peak	Spacewatch	·	1.9 km	MPC · JPL
234009	1997 EX_{39}	—	March 5, 1997	Socorro	LINEAR	·	2.0 km	MPC · JPL
234010	1997 FO_{4}	—	March 31, 1997	Socorro	LINEAR	·	2.0 km	MPC · JPL
234011	1997 HE_{7}	—	April 30, 1997	Socorro	LINEAR	·	2.7 km	MPC · JPL
234012	1997 LF	—	June 1, 1997	Kitt Peak	Spacewatch	·	1.0 km	MPC · JPL
234013	1997 LR_{16}	—	June 8, 1997	La Silla	E. W. Elst	·	3.3 km	MPC · JPL
234014	1997 WJ_{11}	—	November 22, 1997	Kitt Peak	Spacewatch	·	1.5 km	MPC · JPL
234015	1998 FJ_{2}	—	March 20, 1998	Socorro	LINEAR	·	3.6 km	MPC · JPL
234016	1998 FP_{6}	—	March 18, 1998	Kitt Peak	Spacewatch	·	5.2 km	MPC · JPL
234017	1998 ON_{3}	—	July 23, 1998	Caussols	ODAS	·	1.6 km	MPC · JPL
234018	1998 QX_{44}	—	August 17, 1998	Socorro	LINEAR	·	3.8 km	MPC · JPL
234019	1998 QH_{58}	—	August 30, 1998	Kitt Peak	Spacewatch	·	1.0 km	MPC · JPL
234020	1998 RT_{10}	—	September 13, 1998	Kitt Peak	Spacewatch	AST	2.9 km	MPC · JPL
234021	1998 RV_{13}	—	September 13, 1998	Kitt Peak	Spacewatch	·	920 m	MPC · JPL
234022	1998 RR_{44}	—	September 14, 1998	Socorro	LINEAR	·	3.3 km	MPC · JPL
234023	1998 RP_{62}	—	September 14, 1998	Socorro	LINEAR	·	3.4 km	MPC · JPL
234024	1998 SC_{33}	—	September 18, 1998	Socorro	LINEAR	H	690 m	MPC · JPL
234025	1998 SA_{34}	—	September 26, 1998	Socorro	LINEAR	·	3.0 km	MPC · JPL
234026 Unioneastrofili	1998 SJ_{35}	Unioneastrofili	September 23, 1998	San Marcello	L. Tesi	·	960 m	MPC · JPL
234027	1998 SF_{47}	—	September 25, 1998	Kitt Peak	Spacewatch	·	800 m	MPC · JPL
234028	1998 SY_{55}	—	September 16, 1998	Anderson Mesa	LONEOS	·	1.1 km	MPC · JPL
234029	1998 SD_{78}	—	September 26, 1998	Socorro	LINEAR	EUN	1.9 km	MPC · JPL
234030	1998 SR_{78}	—	September 26, 1998	Socorro	LINEAR	·	2.7 km	MPC · JPL
234031	1998 SL_{90}	—	September 26, 1998	Socorro	LINEAR	·	4.3 km	MPC · JPL
234032	1998 SS_{136}	—	September 26, 1998	Socorro	LINEAR	·	2.6 km	MPC · JPL
234033	1998 TF_{15}	—	October 14, 1998	Kitt Peak	Spacewatch	·	2.4 km	MPC · JPL
234034	1998 UE_{44}	—	October 16, 1998	Kitt Peak	Spacewatch	KOR	1.7 km	MPC · JPL
234035	1998 VZ_{42}	—	November 15, 1998	Kitt Peak	Spacewatch	·	3.1 km	MPC · JPL
234036	1998 VZ_{48}	—	November 15, 1998	Kitt Peak	Spacewatch	KOR	1.8 km	MPC · JPL
234037	1998 VG_{57}	—	November 9, 1998	Caussols	ODAS	·	990 m	MPC · JPL
234038	1998 WD_{38}	—	November 21, 1998	Kitt Peak	Spacewatch	KOR	1.6 km	MPC · JPL
234039	1998 WP_{42}	—	November 16, 1998	Haleakala	NEAT	·	5.0 km	MPC · JPL
234040	1998 XF_{1}	—	December 7, 1998	Caussols	ODAS	·	1.3 km	MPC · JPL
234041	1998 XA_{19}	—	December 10, 1998	Kitt Peak	Spacewatch	NYS	1.8 km	MPC · JPL
234042	1999 AH_{32}	—	January 15, 1999	Kitt Peak	Spacewatch	·	2.5 km	MPC · JPL
234043	1999 BS_{4}	—	January 19, 1999	Caussols	ODAS	·	3.3 km	MPC · JPL
234044	1999 BU_{26}	—	January 16, 1999	Kitt Peak	Spacewatch	·	2.8 km	MPC · JPL
234045	1999 CF_{7}	—	February 10, 1999	Socorro	LINEAR	T_{j} (2.99)	5.2 km	MPC · JPL
234046	1999 CH_{29}	—	February 10, 1999	Socorro	LINEAR	·	4.4 km	MPC · JPL
234047	1999 CY_{49}	—	February 10, 1999	Socorro	LINEAR	·	2.2 km	MPC · JPL
234048	1999 CL_{132}	—	February 8, 1999	Kitt Peak	Spacewatch	TIR	4.0 km	MPC · JPL
234049	1999 CO_{147}	—	February 9, 1999	Kitt Peak	Spacewatch	·	1.7 km	MPC · JPL
234050	1999 CX_{148}	—	February 12, 1999	Kitt Peak	Spacewatch	NYS	1.1 km	MPC · JPL
234051	1999 EZ_{9}	—	March 14, 1999	Kitt Peak	Spacewatch	·	1.9 km	MPC · JPL
234052	1999 EL_{14}	—	March 10, 1999	Kitt Peak	Spacewatch	·	3.3 km	MPC · JPL
234053	1999 FR_{1}	—	March 16, 1999	Kitt Peak	Spacewatch	·	2.6 km	MPC · JPL
234054	1999 FF_{12}	—	March 18, 1999	Kitt Peak	Spacewatch	·	3.8 km	MPC · JPL
234055	1999 FO_{17}	—	March 23, 1999	Kitt Peak	Spacewatch	·	3.1 km	MPC · JPL
234056	1999 FZ_{19}	—	March 19, 1999	Kitt Peak	Spacewatch	·	5.0 km	MPC · JPL
234057	1999 FZ_{79}	—	March 20, 1999	Apache Point	SDSS	·	1.6 km	MPC · JPL
234058	1999 FK_{84}	—	March 21, 1999	Apache Point	SDSS	·	4.0 km	MPC · JPL
234059	1999 GT_{15}	—	April 15, 1999	Kitt Peak	Spacewatch	·	4.4 km	MPC · JPL
234060	1999 GY_{63}	—	April 7, 1999	Kitt Peak	Spacewatch	THM	2.6 km	MPC · JPL
234061	1999 HE_{1}	—	April 18, 1999	Catalina	CSS	AMO · APO +1km	2.9 km	MPC · JPL
234062	1999 HL_{1}	—	April 17, 1999	Socorro	LINEAR	T_{j} (2.95)	3.8 km	MPC · JPL
234063	1999 HO_{6}	—	April 18, 1999	Kitt Peak	Spacewatch	·	4.8 km	MPC · JPL
234064	1999 JB_{70}	—	May 12, 1999	Socorro	LINEAR	TIR	3.6 km	MPC · JPL
234065	1999 JJ_{115}	—	May 13, 1999	Socorro	LINEAR	·	1.9 km	MPC · JPL
234066	1999 LD_{15}	—	June 12, 1999	Socorro	LINEAR	T_{j} (2.97)	4.5 km	MPC · JPL
234067	1999 LB_{30}	—	June 12, 1999	Kitt Peak	Spacewatch	NYS	1.6 km	MPC · JPL
234068	1999 LU_{30}	—	June 12, 1999	Kitt Peak	Spacewatch	·	2.0 km	MPC · JPL
234069	1999 OA	—	July 16, 1999	Woomera	F. B. Zoltowski	MAR	1.4 km	MPC · JPL
234070	1999 PV_{1}	—	August 9, 1999	Reedy Creek	J. Broughton	ADE	5.9 km	MPC · JPL
234071	1999 RG_{141}	—	September 9, 1999	Socorro	LINEAR	(5)	2.2 km	MPC · JPL
234072	1999 RJ_{190}	—	September 10, 1999	Socorro	LINEAR	·	2.2 km	MPC · JPL
234073	1999 RT_{193}	—	September 7, 1999	Socorro	LINEAR	·	2.6 km	MPC · JPL
234074	1999 RX_{251}	—	September 6, 1999	Catalina	CSS	·	3.4 km	MPC · JPL
234075	1999 RS_{253}	—	September 10, 1999	Kitt Peak	Spacewatch	MAR	2.5 km	MPC · JPL
234076	1999 SB_{3}	—	September 24, 1999	Socorro	LINEAR	PAL	5.4 km	MPC · JPL
234077	1999 SH_{26}	—	September 30, 1999	Socorro	LINEAR	·	4.8 km	MPC · JPL
234078	1999 TO_{12}	—	October 12, 1999	Prescott	P. G. Comba	·	1.9 km	MPC · JPL
234079	1999 TO_{48}	—	October 4, 1999	Kitt Peak	Spacewatch	·	1.5 km	MPC · JPL
234080	1999 TP_{54}	—	October 6, 1999	Kitt Peak	Spacewatch	·	2.1 km	MPC · JPL
234081	1999 TE_{70}	—	October 9, 1999	Kitt Peak	Spacewatch	·	2.1 km	MPC · JPL
234082	1999 TF_{70}	—	October 9, 1999	Kitt Peak	Spacewatch	·	1.9 km	MPC · JPL
234083	1999 TT_{98}	—	October 2, 1999	Socorro	LINEAR	·	5.3 km	MPC · JPL
234084	1999 TN_{99}	—	October 2, 1999	Socorro	LINEAR	·	2.7 km	MPC · JPL
234085	1999 TE_{104}	—	October 3, 1999	Socorro	LINEAR	·	3.3 km	MPC · JPL
234086	1999 TV_{113}	—	October 4, 1999	Socorro	LINEAR	·	1.6 km	MPC · JPL
234087	1999 TG_{133}	—	October 6, 1999	Socorro	LINEAR	MAR	1.8 km	MPC · JPL
234088	1999 TS_{133}	—	October 6, 1999	Socorro	LINEAR	·	1.9 km	MPC · JPL
234089	1999 TS_{158}	—	October 8, 1999	Socorro	LINEAR	MAR	1.6 km	MPC · JPL
234090	1999 TQ_{159}	—	October 9, 1999	Socorro	LINEAR	(5)	1.8 km	MPC · JPL
234091	1999 TC_{167}	—	October 10, 1999	Socorro	LINEAR	·	1.8 km	MPC · JPL
234092	1999 TU_{168}	—	October 10, 1999	Socorro	LINEAR	·	2.0 km	MPC · JPL
234093	1999 TL_{170}	—	October 10, 1999	Socorro	LINEAR	3:2 · SHU	7.0 km	MPC · JPL
234094	1999 TN_{183}	—	October 11, 1999	Socorro	LINEAR	(5)	1.5 km	MPC · JPL
234095	1999 TO_{184}	—	October 12, 1999	Socorro	LINEAR	EUN	2.1 km	MPC · JPL
234096	1999 TT_{227}	—	October 1, 1999	Kitt Peak	Spacewatch	·	2.3 km	MPC · JPL
234097	1999 TG_{235}	—	October 3, 1999	Catalina	CSS	(5)	2.9 km	MPC · JPL
234098	1999 TJ_{243}	—	October 6, 1999	Socorro	LINEAR	·	3.4 km	MPC · JPL
234099	1999 TO_{293}	—	October 12, 1999	Socorro	LINEAR	·	3.6 km	MPC · JPL
234100	1999 TU_{299}	—	October 2, 1999	Kitt Peak	Spacewatch	·	4.6 km	MPC · JPL

== 234101–234200 ==
back to top

Designation			Discovery			Properties		Ref
Permanent	Provisional	Named after	Date	Site	Discoverer(s)	Category	Diam.	Ref
234101	1999 UK_{37}	—	October 16, 1999	Kitt Peak	Spacewatch	·	1.6 km	MPC · JPL
234102	1999 UK_{42}	—	October 28, 1999	Catalina	CSS	·	3.0 km	MPC · JPL
234103	1999 UO_{52}	—	October 31, 1999	Catalina	CSS	·	2.8 km	MPC · JPL
234104	1999 UA_{57}	—	October 29, 1999	Kitt Peak	Spacewatch	·	1.8 km	MPC · JPL
234105	1999 VP_{15}	—	November 2, 1999	Kitt Peak	Spacewatch	·	2.8 km	MPC · JPL
234106	1999 VU_{39}	—	November 11, 1999	Kitt Peak	Spacewatch	·	4.2 km	MPC · JPL
234107	1999 VP_{42}	—	November 4, 1999	Kitt Peak	Spacewatch	·	2.0 km	MPC · JPL
234108	1999 VR_{82}	—	November 1, 1999	Kitt Peak	Spacewatch	·	1.7 km	MPC · JPL
234109	1999 VA_{116}	—	November 4, 1999	Kitt Peak	Spacewatch	·	2.2 km	MPC · JPL
234110	1999 VL_{126}	—	November 9, 1999	Kitt Peak	Spacewatch	·	2.5 km	MPC · JPL
234111	1999 VU_{130}	—	November 9, 1999	Kitt Peak	Spacewatch	·	1.8 km	MPC · JPL
234112	1999 VD_{167}	—	November 14, 1999	Socorro	LINEAR	·	2.0 km	MPC · JPL
234113	1999 VY_{167}	—	November 14, 1999	Socorro	LINEAR	·	1.8 km	MPC · JPL
234114	1999 VH_{186}	—	November 15, 1999	Socorro	LINEAR	·	3.2 km	MPC · JPL
234115	1999 VT_{218}	—	November 3, 1999	Kitt Peak	Spacewatch	KON	3.4 km	MPC · JPL
234116	1999 VX_{224}	—	November 5, 1999	Socorro	LINEAR	·	2.5 km	MPC · JPL
234117	1999 WZ_{12}	—	November 26, 1999	Ondřejov	L. Kotková	·	3.3 km	MPC · JPL
234118	1999 XO_{2}	—	December 3, 1999	Kitt Peak	Spacewatch	·	1.9 km	MPC · JPL
234119	1999 XZ_{2}	—	December 4, 1999	Catalina	CSS	·	4.2 km	MPC · JPL
234120	1999 XD_{23}	—	December 6, 1999	Socorro	LINEAR	·	2.9 km	MPC · JPL
234121	1999 XJ_{51}	—	December 7, 1999	Socorro	LINEAR	·	6.1 km	MPC · JPL
234122	1999 XP_{111}	—	December 7, 1999	Socorro	LINEAR	(18466)	2.7 km	MPC · JPL
234123	1999 XJ_{130}	—	December 12, 1999	Socorro	LINEAR	·	4.4 km	MPC · JPL
234124	1999 XM_{140}	—	December 2, 1999	Kitt Peak	Spacewatch	·	1.7 km	MPC · JPL
234125	1999 XN_{219}	—	December 15, 1999	Kitt Peak	Spacewatch	KOR	1.6 km	MPC · JPL
234126	1999 YQ_{15}	—	December 31, 1999	Kitt Peak	Spacewatch	·	2.3 km	MPC · JPL
234127	1999 YQ_{23}	—	December 16, 1999	Kitt Peak	Spacewatch	(12739)	1.9 km	MPC · JPL
234128	1999 YL_{24}	—	December 17, 1999	Kitt Peak	Spacewatch	·	2.6 km	MPC · JPL
234129	2000 AN_{129}	—	January 5, 2000	Socorro	LINEAR	·	4.5 km	MPC · JPL
234130	2000 BX_{32}	—	January 28, 2000	Kitt Peak	Spacewatch	·	2.2 km	MPC · JPL
234131	2000 BY_{36}	—	January 30, 2000	Kitt Peak	Spacewatch	·	2.6 km	MPC · JPL
234132	2000 BL_{37}	—	January 26, 2000	Kitt Peak	Spacewatch	·	3.4 km	MPC · JPL
234133	2000 CQ_{139}	—	February 3, 2000	Kitt Peak	Spacewatch	·	800 m	MPC · JPL
234134	2000 CO_{142}	—	February 4, 2000	Kitt Peak	Spacewatch	KOR	1.4 km	MPC · JPL
234135	2000 DJ_{11}	—	February 27, 2000	Kitt Peak	Spacewatch	HYG	4.2 km	MPC · JPL
234136	2000 DT_{16}	—	February 29, 2000	Socorro	LINEAR	·	950 m	MPC · JPL
234137	2000 DC_{59}	—	February 29, 2000	Socorro	LINEAR	·	2.4 km	MPC · JPL
234138	2000 DC_{100}	—	February 29, 2000	Socorro	LINEAR	·	1.0 km	MPC · JPL
234139	2000 DE_{102}	—	February 29, 2000	Socorro	LINEAR	·	2.3 km	MPC · JPL
234140	2000 DE_{103}	—	February 29, 2000	Socorro	LINEAR	EOS	2.9 km	MPC · JPL
234141	2000 EJ_{9}	—	March 3, 2000	Socorro	LINEAR	·	960 m	MPC · JPL
234142	2000 EA_{22}	—	March 5, 2000	Socorro	LINEAR	PHO	1.2 km	MPC · JPL
234143	2000 EY_{44}	—	March 9, 2000	Socorro	LINEAR	·	1.7 km	MPC · JPL
234144	2000 ET_{50}	—	March 11, 2000	Tebbutt	F. B. Zoltowski	·	3.3 km	MPC · JPL
234145	2000 EW_{70}	—	March 9, 2000	Socorro	LINEAR	ATE · PHA	340 m	MPC · JPL
234146	2000 EM_{101}	—	March 12, 2000	Kitt Peak	Spacewatch	·	2.7 km	MPC · JPL
234147	2000 FP	—	March 25, 2000	Kitt Peak	Spacewatch	·	3.1 km	MPC · JPL
234148	2000 FF_{1}	—	March 26, 2000	Socorro	LINEAR	·	1.5 km	MPC · JPL
234149	2000 FG_{4}	—	March 27, 2000	Kitt Peak	Spacewatch	·	2.7 km	MPC · JPL
234150	2000 FO_{14}	—	March 30, 2000	Kitt Peak	Spacewatch	·	840 m	MPC · JPL
234151	2000 FX_{18}	—	March 29, 2000	Socorro	LINEAR	·	4.5 km	MPC · JPL
234152	2000 GK_{11}	—	April 5, 2000	Socorro	LINEAR	·	2.4 km	MPC · JPL
234153	2000 GL_{26}	—	April 5, 2000	Socorro	LINEAR	EOS	2.7 km	MPC · JPL
234154	2000 GP_{62}	—	April 5, 2000	Socorro	LINEAR	EOS	2.4 km	MPC · JPL
234155	2000 GO_{150}	—	April 5, 2000	Socorro	LINEAR	·	750 m	MPC · JPL
234156	2000 GO_{165}	—	April 5, 2000	Socorro	LINEAR	·	2.8 km	MPC · JPL
234157	2000 GE_{168}	—	April 4, 2000	Anderson Mesa	LONEOS	·	1.1 km	MPC · JPL
234158	2000 HQ_{4}	—	April 27, 2000	Kitt Peak	Spacewatch	·	1.5 km	MPC · JPL
234159	2000 HB_{16}	—	April 29, 2000	Socorro	LINEAR	V	880 m	MPC · JPL
234160	2000 HS_{72}	—	April 26, 2000	Kitt Peak	Spacewatch	·	2.1 km	MPC · JPL
234161	2000 HP_{82}	—	April 29, 2000	Socorro	LINEAR	·	920 m	MPC · JPL
234162	2000 HM_{103}	—	April 27, 2000	Anderson Mesa	LONEOS	·	4.0 km	MPC · JPL
234163	2000 JB_{86}	—	May 2, 2000	Socorro	LINEAR	T_{j} (2.99)	6.2 km	MPC · JPL
234164	2000 KD_{2}	—	May 26, 2000	Socorro	LINEAR	PHO	2.7 km	MPC · JPL
234165	2000 KF_{57}	—	May 29, 2000	Anderson Mesa	LONEOS	·	5.5 km	MPC · JPL
234166	2000 KD_{67}	—	May 31, 2000	Socorro	LINEAR	·	7.4 km	MPC · JPL
234167	2000 KV_{69}	—	May 29, 2000	Socorro	LINEAR	·	980 m	MPC · JPL
234168	2000 LB	—	June 1, 2000	Kitt Peak	Spacewatch	·	4.0 km	MPC · JPL
234169	2000 LR	—	June 2, 2000	Reedy Creek	J. Broughton	(2076)	1.2 km	MPC · JPL
234170	2000 LG_{22}	—	June 6, 2000	Kitt Peak	Spacewatch	·	1.1 km	MPC · JPL
234171	2000 LB_{28}	—	June 10, 2000	Prescott	P. G. Comba	·	1.4 km	MPC · JPL
234172	2000 ND_{18}	—	July 5, 2000	Anderson Mesa	LONEOS	THB	4.8 km	MPC · JPL
234173	2000 NO_{18}	—	July 5, 2000	Anderson Mesa	LONEOS	·	1.3 km	MPC · JPL
234174	2000 OJ_{2}	—	July 28, 2000	Prescott	P. G. Comba	MAS	1.0 km	MPC · JPL
234175	2000 OH_{36}	—	July 24, 2000	Socorro	LINEAR	·	4.3 km	MPC · JPL
234176	2000 OS_{54}	—	July 29, 2000	Anderson Mesa	LONEOS	·	890 m	MPC · JPL
234177	2000 QZ_{1}	—	August 24, 2000	Socorro	LINEAR	·	3.8 km	MPC · JPL
234178	2000 QW_{6}	—	August 24, 2000	Socorro	LINEAR	·	1.7 km	MPC · JPL
234179	2000 QJ_{7}	—	August 25, 2000	Socorro	LINEAR	PHO	2.4 km	MPC · JPL
234180	2000 QK_{15}	—	August 24, 2000	Socorro	LINEAR	NYS	1.6 km	MPC · JPL
234181	2000 QS_{16}	—	August 24, 2000	Socorro	LINEAR	NYS	1.6 km	MPC · JPL
234182	2000 QT_{17}	—	August 24, 2000	Socorro	LINEAR	·	1.6 km	MPC · JPL
234183	2000 QU_{46}	—	August 24, 2000	Socorro	LINEAR	·	1.7 km	MPC · JPL
234184	2000 QT_{53}	—	August 25, 2000	Socorro	LINEAR	·	2.7 km	MPC · JPL
234185	2000 QM_{70}	—	August 28, 2000	Socorro	LINEAR	H	900 m	MPC · JPL
234186	2000 QB_{80}	—	August 24, 2000	Socorro	LINEAR	·	2.8 km	MPC · JPL
234187	2000 QP_{80}	—	August 24, 2000	Socorro	LINEAR	NYS	1.6 km	MPC · JPL
234188	2000 QN_{91}	—	August 25, 2000	Socorro	LINEAR	·	3.5 km	MPC · JPL
234189	2000 QU_{94}	—	August 26, 2000	Socorro	LINEAR	·	1.2 km	MPC · JPL
234190	2000 QM_{99}	—	August 28, 2000	Socorro	LINEAR	NYS	1.8 km	MPC · JPL
234191	2000 QA_{126}	—	August 31, 2000	Socorro	LINEAR	·	2.3 km	MPC · JPL
234192	2000 QU_{136}	—	August 29, 2000	Socorro	LINEAR	·	1.2 km	MPC · JPL
234193	2000 QK_{140}	—	August 31, 2000	Socorro	LINEAR	ADE	3.8 km	MPC · JPL
234194	2000 QS_{142}	—	August 31, 2000	Socorro	LINEAR	PHO	1.4 km	MPC · JPL
234195	2000 QH_{153}	—	August 29, 2000	Socorro	LINEAR	·	1.8 km	MPC · JPL
234196	2000 QT_{156}	—	August 31, 2000	Socorro	LINEAR	KON	3.9 km	MPC · JPL
234197	2000 QE_{180}	—	August 31, 2000	Socorro	LINEAR	·	2.4 km	MPC · JPL
234198	2000 QN_{191}	—	August 26, 2000	Socorro	LINEAR	·	1.4 km	MPC · JPL
234199	2000 QH_{203}	—	August 29, 2000	Socorro	LINEAR	·	1.7 km	MPC · JPL
234200	2000 QA_{205}	—	August 31, 2000	Socorro	LINEAR	·	1.7 km	MPC · JPL

== 234201–234300 ==
back to top

Designation			Discovery			Properties		Ref
Permanent	Provisional	Named after	Date	Site	Discoverer(s)	Category	Diam.	Ref
234201	2000 QK_{208}	—	August 31, 2000	Socorro	LINEAR	·	1.8 km	MPC · JPL
234202	2000 QP_{219}	—	August 20, 2000	Anderson Mesa	LONEOS	MAS	1.0 km	MPC · JPL
234203	2000 QN_{229}	—	August 31, 2000	Socorro	LINEAR	·	3.8 km	MPC · JPL
234204	2000 RM_{22}	—	September 1, 2000	Socorro	LINEAR	·	2.8 km	MPC · JPL
234205	2000 RW_{58}	—	September 7, 2000	Kitt Peak	Spacewatch	·	2.1 km	MPC · JPL
234206	2000 RN_{69}	—	September 2, 2000	Socorro	LINEAR	·	2.1 km	MPC · JPL
234207	2000 RV_{88}	—	September 3, 2000	Socorro	LINEAR	·	4.7 km	MPC · JPL
234208	2000 SH_{11}	—	September 23, 2000	Socorro	LINEAR	H	920 m	MPC · JPL
234209	2000 SJ_{18}	—	September 23, 2000	Socorro	LINEAR	·	3.1 km	MPC · JPL
234210	2000 SG_{40}	—	September 24, 2000	Socorro	LINEAR	·	2.2 km	MPC · JPL
234211	2000 SM_{44}	—	September 27, 2000	Socorro	LINEAR	H	940 m	MPC · JPL
234212	2000 SQ_{54}	—	September 24, 2000	Socorro	LINEAR	MAS	1.1 km	MPC · JPL
234213	2000 SH_{63}	—	September 24, 2000	Socorro	LINEAR	·	1.5 km	MPC · JPL
234214	2000 SC_{70}	—	September 24, 2000	Socorro	LINEAR	·	1.2 km	MPC · JPL
234215	2000 SB_{77}	—	September 24, 2000	Socorro	LINEAR	MAS	890 m	MPC · JPL
234216	2000 SX_{104}	—	September 24, 2000	Socorro	LINEAR	·	5.0 km	MPC · JPL
234217	2000 SC_{113}	—	September 24, 2000	Socorro	LINEAR	·	2.2 km	MPC · JPL
234218	2000 SD_{114}	—	September 24, 2000	Socorro	LINEAR	·	1.7 km	MPC · JPL
234219	2000 SX_{114}	—	September 24, 2000	Socorro	LINEAR	·	3.1 km	MPC · JPL
234220	2000 SK_{118}	—	September 24, 2000	Socorro	LINEAR	NYS	2.2 km	MPC · JPL
234221	2000 SZ_{140}	—	September 23, 2000	Socorro	LINEAR	·	2.0 km	MPC · JPL
234222	2000 SF_{141}	—	September 23, 2000	Socorro	LINEAR	(5)	1.6 km	MPC · JPL
234223	2000 SR_{142}	—	September 23, 2000	Socorro	LINEAR	(895)	5.9 km	MPC · JPL
234224	2000 SZ_{144}	—	September 24, 2000	Socorro	LINEAR	·	2.3 km	MPC · JPL
234225	2000 SQ_{168}	—	September 23, 2000	Socorro	LINEAR	·	1.4 km	MPC · JPL
234226	2000 SW_{173}	—	September 28, 2000	Socorro	LINEAR	EUP	7.3 km	MPC · JPL
234227	2000 SR_{215}	—	September 26, 2000	Socorro	LINEAR	·	1.1 km	MPC · JPL
234228	2000 SZ_{227}	—	September 28, 2000	Socorro	LINEAR	·	1.4 km	MPC · JPL
234229	2000 SG_{233}	—	September 30, 2000	Socorro	LINEAR	·	1.8 km	MPC · JPL
234230	2000 ST_{233}	—	September 21, 2000	Socorro	LINEAR	·	1.6 km	MPC · JPL
234231	2000 SX_{235}	—	September 24, 2000	Socorro	LINEAR	ERI	2.5 km	MPC · JPL
234232	2000 SZ_{245}	—	September 24, 2000	Socorro	LINEAR	HYG	5.1 km	MPC · JPL
234233	2000 SH_{257}	—	September 24, 2000	Socorro	LINEAR	·	3.0 km	MPC · JPL
234234	2000 SV_{258}	—	September 24, 2000	Socorro	LINEAR	·	2.5 km	MPC · JPL
234235	2000 SR_{268}	—	September 27, 2000	Socorro	LINEAR	·	2.8 km	MPC · JPL
234236	2000 SG_{272}	—	September 28, 2000	Socorro	LINEAR	(5)	1.5 km	MPC · JPL
234237	2000 SE_{275}	—	September 28, 2000	Socorro	LINEAR	·	2.6 km	MPC · JPL
234238	2000 SL_{285}	—	September 23, 2000	Socorro	LINEAR	ADE	3.3 km	MPC · JPL
234239	2000 SL_{305}	—	September 30, 2000	Socorro	LINEAR	·	2.0 km	MPC · JPL
234240	2000 SH_{316}	—	September 30, 2000	Socorro	LINEAR	PHO	1.6 km	MPC · JPL
234241	2000 SJ_{327}	—	September 29, 2000	Haleakala	NEAT	·	2.8 km	MPC · JPL
234242	2000 SC_{340}	—	September 24, 2000	Socorro	LINEAR	·	1.6 km	MPC · JPL
234243	2000 ST_{352}	—	September 30, 2000	Anderson Mesa	LONEOS	PHO	2.4 km	MPC · JPL
234244	2000 SS_{361}	—	September 23, 2000	Anderson Mesa	LONEOS	·	1.4 km	MPC · JPL
234245	2000 TK_{3}	—	October 1, 2000	Socorro	LINEAR	MAS	980 m	MPC · JPL
234246	2000 TJ_{12}	—	October 1, 2000	Socorro	LINEAR	ERI	2.2 km	MPC · JPL
234247	2000 TF_{29}	—	October 3, 2000	Socorro	LINEAR	EUN	2.0 km	MPC · JPL
234248	2000 TR_{40}	—	October 1, 2000	Socorro	LINEAR	·	1.4 km	MPC · JPL
234249	2000 TZ_{44}	—	October 1, 2000	Socorro	LINEAR	·	1.7 km	MPC · JPL
234250	2000 TU_{46}	—	October 1, 2000	Anderson Mesa	LONEOS	PHO	2.0 km	MPC · JPL
234251	2000 TV_{59}	—	October 2, 2000	Anderson Mesa	LONEOS	EUN	1.9 km	MPC · JPL
234252	2000 UU_{3}	—	October 24, 2000	Socorro	LINEAR	·	2.0 km	MPC · JPL
234253	2000 UY_{5}	—	October 24, 2000	Socorro	LINEAR	·	2.1 km	MPC · JPL
234254	2000 UE_{11}	—	October 20, 2000	Nacogdoches	W. D. Bruton, S. P Scurlock	·	1.8 km	MPC · JPL
234255	2000 UF_{27}	—	October 24, 2000	Socorro	LINEAR	KON	3.6 km	MPC · JPL
234256	2000 UX_{40}	—	October 24, 2000	Socorro	LINEAR	(5)	1.7 km	MPC · JPL
234257	2000 UE_{62}	—	October 25, 2000	Socorro	LINEAR	·	1.8 km	MPC · JPL
234258	2000 UU_{62}	—	October 25, 2000	Socorro	LINEAR	·	1.9 km	MPC · JPL
234259	2000 UM_{75}	—	October 31, 2000	Socorro	LINEAR	·	2.6 km	MPC · JPL
234260	2000 VV_{3}	—	November 1, 2000	Socorro	LINEAR	·	1.4 km	MPC · JPL
234261	2000 VF_{11}	—	November 1, 2000	Socorro	LINEAR	EUP	6.0 km	MPC · JPL
234262	2000 VR_{11}	—	November 1, 2000	Socorro	LINEAR	(5)	1.4 km	MPC · JPL
234263	2000 VW_{12}	—	November 1, 2000	Socorro	LINEAR	·	2.1 km	MPC · JPL
234264	2000 VH_{40}	—	November 1, 2000	Socorro	LINEAR	(5)	1.3 km	MPC · JPL
234265	2000 VU_{46}	—	November 3, 2000	Socorro	LINEAR	EUP	8.0 km	MPC · JPL
234266	2000 VG_{54}	—	November 3, 2000	Socorro	LINEAR	·	2.0 km	MPC · JPL
234267	2000 VC_{55}	—	November 3, 2000	Socorro	LINEAR	(5)	1.8 km	MPC · JPL
234268	2000 WJ_{2}	—	November 16, 2000	Socorro	LINEAR	BAR	1.5 km	MPC · JPL
234269	2000 WW_{4}	—	November 19, 2000	Socorro	LINEAR	·	3.8 km	MPC · JPL
234270	2000 WV_{7}	—	November 20, 2000	Socorro	LINEAR	KON	3.0 km	MPC · JPL
234271	2000 WP_{16}	—	November 21, 2000	Socorro	LINEAR	EUN	1.8 km	MPC · JPL
234272	2000 WT_{23}	—	November 20, 2000	Socorro	LINEAR	·	1.3 km	MPC · JPL
234273	2000 WZ_{37}	—	November 20, 2000	Socorro	LINEAR	·	1.9 km	MPC · JPL
234274	2000 WT_{68}	—	November 19, 2000	Socorro	LINEAR	·	2.4 km	MPC · JPL
234275	2000 WK_{97}	—	November 21, 2000	Socorro	LINEAR	·	3.3 km	MPC · JPL
234276	2000 WL_{102}	—	November 26, 2000	Socorro	LINEAR	ADE	3.1 km	MPC · JPL
234277	2000 WC_{109}	—	November 20, 2000	Socorro	LINEAR	·	3.2 km	MPC · JPL
234278	2000 WO_{114}	—	November 20, 2000	Socorro	LINEAR	·	3.2 km	MPC · JPL
234279	2000 WD_{122}	—	November 29, 2000	Socorro	LINEAR	·	3.0 km	MPC · JPL
234280	2000 WM_{154}	—	November 30, 2000	Socorro	LINEAR	·	2.4 km	MPC · JPL
234281	2000 WC_{160}	—	November 20, 2000	Anderson Mesa	LONEOS	(5)	1.5 km	MPC · JPL
234282	2000 WY_{162}	—	November 20, 2000	Anderson Mesa	LONEOS	·	1.4 km	MPC · JPL
234283	2000 WM_{173}	—	November 25, 2000	Socorro	LINEAR	·	2.1 km	MPC · JPL
234284	2000 WR_{177}	—	November 27, 2000	Haleakala	NEAT	·	1.4 km	MPC · JPL
234285	2000 XU_{6}	—	December 1, 2000	Socorro	LINEAR	MAR	2.5 km	MPC · JPL
234286	2000 XE_{8}	—	December 1, 2000	Socorro	LINEAR	EUN	2.3 km	MPC · JPL
234287	2000 XM_{11}	—	December 1, 2000	Socorro	LINEAR	·	2.8 km	MPC · JPL
234288	2000 XY_{12}	—	December 4, 2000	Socorro	LINEAR	·	2.3 km	MPC · JPL
234289	2000 XT_{41}	—	December 5, 2000	Socorro	LINEAR	·	4.5 km	MPC · JPL
234290	2000 XS_{50}	—	December 6, 2000	Socorro	LINEAR	·	4.2 km	MPC · JPL
234291	2000 YA_{7}	—	December 20, 2000	Socorro	LINEAR	·	2.8 km	MPC · JPL
234292 Wolfganghansch	2000 YL_{8}	Wolfganghansch	December 16, 2000	Uccle	T. Pauwels	·	1.9 km	MPC · JPL
234293	2000 YA_{19}	—	December 21, 2000	Kitt Peak	Spacewatch	·	2.3 km	MPC · JPL
234294 Pappsándor	2000 YD_{32}	Pappsándor	December 31, 2000	Piszkéstető	K. Sárneczky, L. Kiss	MRX	1.4 km	MPC · JPL
234295	2000 YK_{45}	—	December 30, 2000	Socorro	LINEAR	·	6.3 km	MPC · JPL
234296	2000 YR_{60}	—	December 30, 2000	Socorro	LINEAR	·	3.5 km	MPC · JPL
234297	2000 YX_{64}	—	December 29, 2000	Kitt Peak	Spacewatch	·	1.4 km	MPC · JPL
234298	2000 YZ_{73}	—	December 30, 2000	Socorro	LINEAR	·	1.8 km	MPC · JPL
234299	2000 YL_{95}	—	December 30, 2000	Socorro	LINEAR	·	1.9 km	MPC · JPL
234300	2000 YO_{125}	—	December 29, 2000	Anderson Mesa	LONEOS	·	2.4 km	MPC · JPL

== 234301–234400 ==
back to top

Designation			Discovery			Properties		Ref
Permanent	Provisional	Named after	Date	Site	Discoverer(s)	Category	Diam.	Ref
234301	2000 YJ_{130}	—	December 30, 2000	Socorro	LINEAR	·	1.8 km	MPC · JPL
234302	2001 AA	—	January 1, 2001	Haleakala	NEAT	·	3.1 km	MPC · JPL
234303	2001 AA_{1}	—	January 1, 2001	Kitt Peak	Spacewatch	·	1.9 km	MPC · JPL
234304	2001 AO_{10}	—	January 2, 2001	Socorro	LINEAR	·	2.5 km	MPC · JPL
234305	2001 AF_{22}	—	January 3, 2001	Socorro	LINEAR	·	1.9 km	MPC · JPL
234306	2001 AZ_{27}	—	January 5, 2001	Socorro	LINEAR	·	2.1 km	MPC · JPL
234307	2001 AO_{37}	—	January 5, 2001	Socorro	LINEAR	·	1.9 km	MPC · JPL
234308	2001 AD_{39}	—	January 2, 2001	Kitt Peak	Spacewatch	·	3.2 km	MPC · JPL
234309	2001 AZ_{40}	—	January 3, 2001	Anderson Mesa	LONEOS	·	3.9 km	MPC · JPL
234310	2001 AG_{46}	—	January 15, 2001	Socorro	LINEAR	·	1.8 km	MPC · JPL
234311	2001 AL_{53}	—	January 3, 2001	Socorro	LINEAR	ADE	4.2 km	MPC · JPL
234312	2001 BV_{1}	—	January 16, 2001	Haleakala	NEAT	·	870 m	MPC · JPL
234313	2001 BF_{6}	—	January 19, 2001	Socorro	LINEAR	·	2.0 km	MPC · JPL
234314	2001 BY_{30}	—	January 20, 2001	Socorro	LINEAR	·	2.4 km	MPC · JPL
234315	2001 BA_{46}	—	January 21, 2001	Socorro	LINEAR	·	1.8 km	MPC · JPL
234316	2001 BX_{51}	—	January 16, 2001	Haleakala	NEAT	·	3.2 km	MPC · JPL
234317	2001 BE_{76}	—	January 26, 2001	Socorro	LINEAR	·	2.0 km	MPC · JPL
234318	2001 CL_{8}	—	February 1, 2001	Socorro	LINEAR	·	2.0 km	MPC · JPL
234319	2001 CR_{11}	—	February 1, 2001	Socorro	LINEAR	·	2.8 km	MPC · JPL
234320	2001 CY_{18}	—	February 2, 2001	Socorro	LINEAR	EUN	2.2 km	MPC · JPL
234321	2001 CA_{23}	—	February 1, 2001	Anderson Mesa	LONEOS	·	2.5 km	MPC · JPL
234322	2001 CX_{31}	—	February 12, 2001	Socorro	LINEAR	(116763)	5.6 km	MPC · JPL
234323	2001 DR_{20}	—	February 16, 2001	Socorro	LINEAR	EUN	2.1 km	MPC · JPL
234324	2001 DR_{36}	—	February 19, 2001	Socorro	LINEAR	KON	4.1 km	MPC · JPL
234325	2001 DR_{55}	—	February 16, 2001	Kitt Peak	Spacewatch	·	2.3 km	MPC · JPL
234326	2001 DP_{64}	—	February 19, 2001	Socorro	LINEAR	EUN	2.1 km	MPC · JPL
234327	2001 DG_{77}	—	February 16, 2001	Kitt Peak	Spacewatch	·	3.8 km	MPC · JPL
234328	2001 DP_{93}	—	February 19, 2001	Socorro	LINEAR	·	1.9 km	MPC · JPL
234329	2001 DO_{98}	—	February 17, 2001	Socorro	LINEAR	·	2.9 km	MPC · JPL
234330	2001 EF	—	March 1, 2001	Socorro	LINEAR	·	3.7 km	MPC · JPL
234331	2001 EN_{10}	—	March 2, 2001	Anderson Mesa	LONEOS	·	2.6 km	MPC · JPL
234332	2001 EC_{15}	—	March 15, 2001	Socorro	LINEAR	·	3.3 km	MPC · JPL
234333	2001 EZ_{17}	—	March 15, 2001	Oizumi	T. Kobayashi	·	2.0 km	MPC · JPL
234334	2001 EJ_{25}	—	March 15, 2001	Anderson Mesa	LONEOS	·	2.3 km	MPC · JPL
234335	2001 FU	—	March 16, 2001	Socorro	LINEAR	·	4.5 km	MPC · JPL
234336	2001 FH_{1}	—	March 18, 2001	Junk Bond	D. Healy	·	2.8 km	MPC · JPL
234337	2001 FX_{3}	—	March 18, 2001	Socorro	LINEAR	·	2.9 km	MPC · JPL
234338	2001 FW_{25}	—	March 18, 2001	Socorro	LINEAR	·	2.6 km	MPC · JPL
234339	2001 FE_{36}	—	March 18, 2001	Socorro	LINEAR	·	4.4 km	MPC · JPL
234340	2001 FS_{44}	—	March 18, 2001	Socorro	LINEAR	·	2.9 km	MPC · JPL
234341	2001 FZ_{57}	—	March 21, 2001	Anderson Mesa	LONEOS	ATE	340 m	MPC · JPL
234342	2001 FF_{68}	—	March 19, 2001	Socorro	LINEAR	·	3.5 km	MPC · JPL
234343	2001 FM_{84}	—	March 26, 2001	Kitt Peak	Spacewatch	HOF	3.2 km	MPC · JPL
234344	2001 FM_{85}	—	March 26, 2001	Kitt Peak	Spacewatch	PAD	2.5 km	MPC · JPL
234345	2001 FW_{89}	—	March 27, 2001	Kitt Peak	Spacewatch	·	2.3 km	MPC · JPL
234346	2001 FK_{120}	—	March 24, 2001	Socorro	LINEAR	·	1.9 km	MPC · JPL
234347	2001 FQ_{126}	—	March 26, 2001	Socorro	LINEAR	·	3.6 km	MPC · JPL
234348	2001 FV_{158}	—	March 28, 2001	Kitt Peak	Spacewatch	·	7.0 km	MPC · JPL
234349	2001 FT_{167}	—	March 19, 2001	Cima Ekar	ADAS	·	3.3 km	MPC · JPL
234350	2001 GV_{4}	—	April 15, 2001	Socorro	LINEAR	·	3.1 km	MPC · JPL
234351	2001 HX_{28}	—	April 27, 2001	Socorro	LINEAR	·	1.7 km	MPC · JPL
234352	2001 HZ_{41}	—	April 16, 2001	Socorro	LINEAR	fast	3.1 km	MPC · JPL
234353	2001 HR_{43}	—	April 16, 2001	Anderson Mesa	LONEOS	·	2.2 km	MPC · JPL
234354	2001 HG_{47}	—	April 18, 2001	Socorro	LINEAR	·	3.5 km	MPC · JPL
234355	2001 HX_{57}	—	April 25, 2001	Anderson Mesa	LONEOS	·	2.2 km	MPC · JPL
234356	2001 HD_{65}	—	April 28, 2001	Kitt Peak	Spacewatch	·	2.4 km	MPC · JPL
234357	2001 JA_{5}	—	May 13, 2001	Ondřejov	L. Kotková	·	5.2 km	MPC · JPL
234358	2001 JC_{6}	—	May 11, 2001	Haleakala	NEAT	·	1.8 km	MPC · JPL
234359	2001 KS_{64}	—	May 21, 2001	Anderson Mesa	LONEOS	·	5.2 km	MPC · JPL
234360	2001 MV_{25}	—	June 19, 2001	Palomar	NEAT	·	1.1 km	MPC · JPL
234361	2001 NX_{2}	—	July 12, 2001	Palomar	NEAT	·	5.6 km	MPC · JPL
234362	2001 NK_{13}	—	July 12, 2001	Palomar	NEAT	NYS	1.5 km	MPC · JPL
234363	2001 NB_{14}	—	July 14, 2001	Palomar	NEAT	·	4.9 km	MPC · JPL
234364	2001 OU_{28}	—	July 18, 2001	Palomar	NEAT	EOS	2.7 km	MPC · JPL
234365	2001 OL_{29}	—	July 18, 2001	Palomar	NEAT	·	4.7 km	MPC · JPL
234366	2001 OR_{61}	—	July 21, 2001	Haleakala	NEAT	·	4.8 km	MPC · JPL
234367	2001 OP_{68}	—	July 16, 2001	Haleakala	NEAT	·	2.1 km	MPC · JPL
234368	2001 OL_{77}	—	July 25, 2001	Haleakala	NEAT	PHO	3.4 km	MPC · JPL
234369	2001 OX_{85}	—	July 21, 2001	Kitt Peak	Spacewatch	·	1.0 km	MPC · JPL
234370	2001 OF_{87}	—	July 29, 2001	Palomar	NEAT	·	5.8 km	MPC · JPL
234371	2001 OM_{89}	—	July 22, 2001	Socorro	LINEAR	·	1.2 km	MPC · JPL
234372	2001 OA_{113}	—	July 17, 2001	Anderson Mesa	LONEOS	·	3.9 km	MPC · JPL
234373	2001 PP_{26}	—	August 11, 2001	Haleakala	NEAT	·	990 m	MPC · JPL
234374	2001 PW_{39}	—	August 11, 2001	Palomar	NEAT	·	2.1 km	MPC · JPL
234375	2001 PQ_{58}	—	August 14, 2001	Haleakala	NEAT	·	2.8 km	MPC · JPL
234376	2001 QV_{8}	—	August 16, 2001	Socorro	LINEAR	LIX	4.5 km	MPC · JPL
234377	2001 QL_{34}	—	August 16, 2001	Socorro	LINEAR	·	1.3 km	MPC · JPL
234378	2001 QA_{48}	—	August 16, 2001	Socorro	LINEAR	·	5.6 km	MPC · JPL
234379	2001 QD_{53}	—	August 16, 2001	Socorro	LINEAR	THM	3.2 km	MPC · JPL
234380	2001 QG_{58}	—	August 16, 2001	Socorro	LINEAR	·	1.1 km	MPC · JPL
234381	2001 QB_{60}	—	August 18, 2001	Socorro	LINEAR	ERI	2.0 km	MPC · JPL
234382	2001 QC_{67}	—	August 18, 2001	Socorro	LINEAR	·	1.1 km	MPC · JPL
234383	2001 QB_{68}	—	August 16, 2001	Kitt Peak	Spacewatch	·	2.6 km	MPC · JPL
234384	2001 QN_{97}	—	August 17, 2001	Socorro	LINEAR	T_{j} (2.99) · EUP	6.6 km	MPC · JPL
234385	2001 QX_{107}	—	August 23, 2001	Anderson Mesa	LONEOS	·	1.1 km	MPC · JPL
234386	2001 QR_{113}	—	August 25, 2001	Ondřejov	P. Kušnirák, P. Pravec	·	4.5 km	MPC · JPL
234387	2001 QP_{135}	—	August 22, 2001	Socorro	LINEAR	·	6.8 km	MPC · JPL
234388	2001 QV_{161}	—	August 23, 2001	Anderson Mesa	LONEOS	·	930 m	MPC · JPL
234389	2001 QP_{163}	—	August 31, 2001	Desert Eagle	W. K. Y. Yeung	·	1.8 km	MPC · JPL
234390	2001 QJ_{203}	—	August 23, 2001	Kitt Peak	Spacewatch	·	4.8 km	MPC · JPL
234391	2001 QH_{204}	—	August 23, 2001	Anderson Mesa	LONEOS	·	1.3 km	MPC · JPL
234392	2001 QH_{240}	—	August 24, 2001	Socorro	LINEAR	·	3.8 km	MPC · JPL
234393	2001 QA_{246}	—	August 24, 2001	Socorro	LINEAR	·	1.2 km	MPC · JPL
234394	2001 QU_{252}	—	August 25, 2001	Socorro	LINEAR	·	3.8 km	MPC · JPL
234395	2001 QM_{253}	—	August 25, 2001	Socorro	LINEAR	·	1.5 km	MPC · JPL
234396	2001 QC_{260}	—	August 25, 2001	Socorro	LINEAR	·	1.6 km	MPC · JPL
234397	2001 QN_{265}	—	August 26, 2001	Desert Eagle	W. K. Y. Yeung	T_{j} (2.98)	6.8 km	MPC · JPL
234398	2001 QG_{283}	—	August 18, 2001	Anderson Mesa	LONEOS	·	3.4 km	MPC · JPL
234399	2001 QY_{286}	—	August 17, 2001	Socorro	LINEAR	·	2.3 km	MPC · JPL
234400	2001 QR_{292}	—	August 16, 2001	Palomar	NEAT	·	6.3 km	MPC · JPL

== 234401–234500 ==
back to top

Designation			Discovery			Properties		Ref
Permanent	Provisional	Named after	Date	Site	Discoverer(s)	Category	Diam.	Ref
234401	2001 QB_{330}	—	August 25, 2001	Anderson Mesa	LONEOS	·	3.0 km	MPC · JPL
234402	2001 QR_{334}	—	August 22, 2001	Kitt Peak	Spacewatch	·	3.5 km	MPC · JPL
234403	2001 RF_{12}	—	September 11, 2001	Anderson Mesa	LONEOS	·	980 m	MPC · JPL
234404	2001 RF_{14}	—	September 10, 2001	Socorro	LINEAR	THM	2.8 km	MPC · JPL
234405	2001 RX_{16}	—	September 11, 2001	Desert Eagle	W. K. Y. Yeung	·	2.6 km	MPC · JPL
234406	2001 RO_{17}	—	September 11, 2001	Desert Eagle	W. K. Y. Yeung	·	1.6 km	MPC · JPL
234407	2001 RK_{19}	—	September 7, 2001	Socorro	LINEAR	·	1.5 km	MPC · JPL
234408	2001 RY_{22}	—	September 7, 2001	Socorro	LINEAR	·	3.4 km	MPC · JPL
234409	2001 RO_{23}	—	September 7, 2001	Socorro	LINEAR	·	950 m	MPC · JPL
234410	2001 RJ_{25}	—	September 7, 2001	Socorro	LINEAR	·	4.5 km	MPC · JPL
234411	2001 RO_{28}	—	September 7, 2001	Socorro	LINEAR	·	1.3 km	MPC · JPL
234412	2001 RY_{48}	—	September 11, 2001	Socorro	LINEAR	PHO	1.7 km	MPC · JPL
234413	2001 RM_{58}	—	September 12, 2001	Socorro	LINEAR	·	1.2 km	MPC · JPL
234414	2001 RY_{58}	—	September 12, 2001	Socorro	LINEAR	·	940 m	MPC · JPL
234415	2001 RK_{59}	—	September 12, 2001	Socorro	LINEAR	·	6.9 km	MPC · JPL
234416	2001 RP_{62}	—	September 12, 2001	Socorro	LINEAR	·	4.1 km	MPC · JPL
234417	2001 RJ_{70}	—	September 10, 2001	Socorro	LINEAR	·	1.4 km	MPC · JPL
234418	2001 RQ_{83}	—	September 11, 2001	Anderson Mesa	LONEOS	·	970 m	MPC · JPL
234419	2001 RQ_{85}	—	September 11, 2001	Anderson Mesa	LONEOS	·	830 m	MPC · JPL
234420	2001 RE_{93}	—	September 11, 2001	Anderson Mesa	LONEOS	H	780 m	MPC · JPL
234421	2001 RV_{94}	—	September 11, 2001	Anderson Mesa	LONEOS	(2076)	1.1 km	MPC · JPL
234422	2001 RT_{101}	—	September 12, 2001	Socorro	LINEAR	·	2.5 km	MPC · JPL
234423	2001 RV_{103}	—	September 12, 2001	Socorro	LINEAR	·	3.1 km	MPC · JPL
234424	2001 RT_{105}	—	September 12, 2001	Socorro	LINEAR	·	4.0 km	MPC · JPL
234425	2001 RO_{111}	—	September 12, 2001	Socorro	LINEAR	·	5.1 km	MPC · JPL
234426	2001 RN_{117}	—	September 12, 2001	Socorro	LINEAR	HYG	3.5 km	MPC · JPL
234427	2001 RV_{132}	—	September 12, 2001	Socorro	LINEAR	·	1.4 km	MPC · JPL
234428	2001 RN_{146}	—	September 9, 2001	Palomar	NEAT	URS	6.8 km	MPC · JPL
234429	2001 RD_{147}	—	September 9, 2001	Anderson Mesa	LONEOS	·	5.0 km	MPC · JPL
234430	2001 SM_{6}	—	September 18, 2001	Kitt Peak	Spacewatch	·	1 km	MPC · JPL
234431	2001 SO_{9}	—	September 18, 2001	Desert Eagle	W. K. Y. Yeung	·	4.4 km	MPC · JPL
234432	2001 SP_{25}	—	September 16, 2001	Socorro	LINEAR	·	6.0 km	MPC · JPL
234433	2001 SA_{26}	—	September 16, 2001	Socorro	LINEAR	·	1.0 km	MPC · JPL
234434	2001 SQ_{35}	—	September 16, 2001	Socorro	LINEAR	·	3.7 km	MPC · JPL
234435	2001 SS_{41}	—	September 16, 2001	Socorro	LINEAR	ERI	1.7 km	MPC · JPL
234436	2001 SV_{47}	—	September 16, 2001	Socorro	LINEAR	·	1.2 km	MPC · JPL
234437	2001 SG_{48}	—	September 16, 2001	Socorro	LINEAR	·	3.8 km	MPC · JPL
234438	2001 SR_{65}	—	September 17, 2001	Socorro	LINEAR	·	1.7 km	MPC · JPL
234439	2001 ST_{71}	—	September 17, 2001	Socorro	LINEAR	·	4.8 km	MPC · JPL
234440	2001 SE_{85}	—	September 20, 2001	Socorro	LINEAR	VER	3.8 km	MPC · JPL
234441	2001 SG_{85}	—	September 20, 2001	Socorro	LINEAR	CYB	3.8 km	MPC · JPL
234442	2001 SN_{87}	—	September 20, 2001	Socorro	LINEAR	·	1.2 km	MPC · JPL
234443	2001 SK_{94}	—	September 20, 2001	Socorro	LINEAR	·	1.0 km	MPC · JPL
234444	2001 SA_{99}	—	September 20, 2001	Socorro	LINEAR	·	3.3 km	MPC · JPL
234445	2001 SS_{133}	—	September 16, 2001	Socorro	LINEAR	·	5.3 km	MPC · JPL
234446	2001 SF_{137}	—	September 16, 2001	Socorro	LINEAR	·	1.3 km	MPC · JPL
234447	2001 SA_{144}	—	September 16, 2001	Socorro	LINEAR	NYS	2.0 km	MPC · JPL
234448	2001 SR_{146}	—	September 16, 2001	Socorro	LINEAR	·	1.4 km	MPC · JPL
234449	2001 SV_{147}	—	September 17, 2001	Socorro	LINEAR	·	1.4 km	MPC · JPL
234450	2001 SL_{148}	—	September 17, 2001	Socorro	LINEAR	·	900 m	MPC · JPL
234451	2001 SN_{150}	—	September 17, 2001	Socorro	LINEAR	·	5.3 km	MPC · JPL
234452	2001 SJ_{152}	—	September 17, 2001	Socorro	LINEAR	·	1.1 km	MPC · JPL
234453	2001 SS_{156}	—	September 17, 2001	Socorro	LINEAR	LUT	6.4 km	MPC · JPL
234454	2001 SE_{160}	—	September 17, 2001	Socorro	LINEAR	·	1.4 km	MPC · JPL
234455	2001 SL_{164}	—	September 17, 2001	Socorro	LINEAR	·	5.3 km	MPC · JPL
234456	2001 SR_{180}	—	September 19, 2001	Socorro	LINEAR	·	930 m	MPC · JPL
234457	2001 SG_{181}	—	September 19, 2001	Socorro	LINEAR	·	4.1 km	MPC · JPL
234458	2001 SJ_{181}	—	September 19, 2001	Socorro	LINEAR	·	1.1 km	MPC · JPL
234459	2001 SN_{181}	—	September 19, 2001	Socorro	LINEAR	·	5.6 km	MPC · JPL
234460	2001 ST_{191}	—	September 19, 2001	Socorro	LINEAR	·	950 m	MPC · JPL
234461	2001 SR_{192}	—	September 19, 2001	Socorro	LINEAR	·	970 m	MPC · JPL
234462	2001 SO_{207}	—	September 19, 2001	Socorro	LINEAR	HYG	3.5 km	MPC · JPL
234463	2001 SA_{213}	—	September 19, 2001	Socorro	LINEAR	·	920 m	MPC · JPL
234464	2001 SV_{220}	—	September 19, 2001	Socorro	LINEAR	NYS	1.3 km	MPC · JPL
234465	2001 SL_{223}	—	September 19, 2001	Socorro	LINEAR	NYS	1.4 km	MPC · JPL
234466	2001 SG_{229}	—	September 19, 2001	Socorro	LINEAR	V	790 m	MPC · JPL
234467	2001 SV_{236}	—	September 19, 2001	Socorro	LINEAR	V	820 m	MPC · JPL
234468	2001 SG_{240}	—	September 19, 2001	Socorro	LINEAR	·	700 m	MPC · JPL
234469	2001 SB_{245}	—	September 19, 2001	Socorro	LINEAR	·	4.2 km	MPC · JPL
234470	2001 SF_{255}	—	September 19, 2001	Socorro	LINEAR	·	4.8 km	MPC · JPL
234471	2001 SH_{259}	—	September 20, 2001	Socorro	LINEAR	·	3.5 km	MPC · JPL
234472	2001 SY_{267}	—	September 25, 2001	Desert Eagle	W. K. Y. Yeung	·	1.9 km	MPC · JPL
234473	2001 SR_{273}	—	September 19, 2001	Kitt Peak	Spacewatch	·	5.9 km	MPC · JPL
234474	2001 ST_{283}	—	September 22, 2001	Kitt Peak	Spacewatch	EOS	2.9 km	MPC · JPL
234475	2001 SJ_{298}	—	September 20, 2001	Socorro	LINEAR	·	5.0 km	MPC · JPL
234476	2001 SJ_{303}	—	September 20, 2001	Socorro	LINEAR	·	5.1 km	MPC · JPL
234477	2001 SD_{311}	—	September 19, 2001	Socorro	LINEAR	·	6.2 km	MPC · JPL
234478	2001 SK_{315}	—	September 25, 2001	Socorro	LINEAR	·	2.1 km	MPC · JPL
234479	2001 SZ_{317}	—	September 19, 2001	Socorro	LINEAR	·	960 m	MPC · JPL
234480	2001 SF_{335}	—	September 20, 2001	Socorro	LINEAR	·	4.2 km	MPC · JPL
234481	2001 TM_{6}	—	October 10, 2001	Palomar	NEAT	·	3.2 km	MPC · JPL
234482	2001 TS_{11}	—	October 13, 2001	Socorro	LINEAR	·	990 m	MPC · JPL
234483	2001 TV_{14}	—	October 10, 2001	Palomar	NEAT	·	8.9 km	MPC · JPL
234484	2001 TS_{29}	—	October 14, 2001	Socorro	LINEAR	·	880 m	MPC · JPL
234485	2001 TB_{30}	—	October 14, 2001	Socorro	LINEAR	·	900 m	MPC · JPL
234486	2001 TK_{52}	—	October 13, 2001	Socorro	LINEAR	·	1 km	MPC · JPL
234487	2001 TK_{56}	—	October 15, 2001	Socorro	LINEAR	·	1.6 km	MPC · JPL
234488	2001 TK_{59}	—	October 13, 2001	Socorro	LINEAR	·	1.4 km	MPC · JPL
234489	2001 TM_{62}	—	October 13, 2001	Socorro	LINEAR	LIX	6.3 km	MPC · JPL
234490	2001 TO_{66}	—	October 13, 2001	Socorro	LINEAR	·	3.2 km	MPC · JPL
234491	2001 TW_{66}	—	October 13, 2001	Socorro	LINEAR	·	1.0 km	MPC · JPL
234492	2001 TQ_{72}	—	October 13, 2001	Socorro	LINEAR	·	1.5 km	MPC · JPL
234493	2001 TC_{75}	—	October 13, 2001	Socorro	LINEAR	·	1.4 km	MPC · JPL
234494	2001 TA_{83}	—	October 14, 2001	Socorro	LINEAR	V	800 m	MPC · JPL
234495	2001 TH_{87}	—	October 14, 2001	Socorro	LINEAR	·	1.0 km	MPC · JPL
234496	2001 TX_{93}	—	October 14, 2001	Socorro	LINEAR	·	1.8 km	MPC · JPL
234497	2001 TF_{94}	—	October 14, 2001	Socorro	LINEAR	·	6.0 km	MPC · JPL
234498	2001 TA_{95}	—	October 14, 2001	Socorro	LINEAR	·	5.6 km	MPC · JPL
234499	2001 TS_{95}	—	October 14, 2001	Socorro	LINEAR	·	1 km	MPC · JPL
234500	2001 TS_{98}	—	October 14, 2001	Socorro	LINEAR	·	1.1 km	MPC · JPL

== 234501–234600 ==
back to top

Designation			Discovery			Properties		Ref
Permanent	Provisional	Named after	Date	Site	Discoverer(s)	Category	Diam.	Ref
234501	2001 TZ_{120}	—	October 15, 2001	Socorro	LINEAR	·	2.1 km	MPC · JPL
234502	2001 TJ_{132}	—	October 11, 2001	Palomar	NEAT	·	4.3 km	MPC · JPL
234503	2001 TL_{147}	—	October 10, 2001	Palomar	NEAT	NYS	1.2 km	MPC · JPL
234504	2001 TQ_{150}	—	October 10, 2001	Palomar	NEAT	V	1.2 km	MPC · JPL
234505	2001 TM_{151}	—	October 10, 2001	Palomar	NEAT	·	1.9 km	MPC · JPL
234506	2001 TW_{152}	—	October 10, 2001	Palomar	NEAT	NYS	1.2 km	MPC · JPL
234507	2001 TN_{154}	—	October 15, 2001	Palomar	NEAT	(2076)	1.3 km	MPC · JPL
234508	2001 TJ_{157}	—	October 14, 2001	Kitt Peak	Spacewatch	NYS	1.5 km	MPC · JPL
234509	2001 TD_{175}	—	October 15, 2001	Socorro	LINEAR	EOS	2.6 km	MPC · JPL
234510	2001 TX_{179}	—	October 14, 2001	Socorro	LINEAR	·	1.7 km	MPC · JPL
234511	2001 TC_{184}	—	October 14, 2001	Socorro	LINEAR	·	1.1 km	MPC · JPL
234512	2001 TL_{216}	—	October 13, 2001	Palomar	NEAT	·	6.6 km	MPC · JPL
234513	2001 TU_{232}	—	October 15, 2001	Palomar	NEAT	·	970 m	MPC · JPL
234514	2001 TW_{240}	—	October 14, 2001	Socorro	LINEAR	CYB	7.7 km	MPC · JPL
234515	2001 TP_{256}	—	October 8, 2001	Palomar	NEAT	EOS	3.3 km	MPC · JPL
234516	2001 UP_{12}	—	October 24, 2001	Desert Eagle	W. K. Y. Yeung	·	1.7 km	MPC · JPL
234517	2001 UP_{14}	—	October 24, 2001	Desert Eagle	W. K. Y. Yeung	LIX	5.9 km	MPC · JPL
234518	2001 UN_{24}	—	October 18, 2001	Socorro	LINEAR	·	4.5 km	MPC · JPL
234519	2001 UC_{36}	—	October 16, 2001	Socorro	LINEAR	·	2.7 km	MPC · JPL
234520	2001 UT_{40}	—	October 17, 2001	Socorro	LINEAR	·	1.9 km	MPC · JPL
234521	2001 UH_{44}	—	October 17, 2001	Socorro	LINEAR	·	4.8 km	MPC · JPL
234522	2001 US_{48}	—	October 17, 2001	Socorro	LINEAR	NYS	1.5 km	MPC · JPL
234523	2001 UU_{72}	—	October 23, 2001	Socorro	LINEAR	PHO	1.8 km	MPC · JPL
234524	2001 UW_{85}	—	October 16, 2001	Kitt Peak	Spacewatch	MAS	920 m	MPC · JPL
234525	2001 UZ_{88}	—	October 18, 2001	Palomar	NEAT	·	1.4 km	MPC · JPL
234526	2001 UD_{127}	—	October 17, 2001	Socorro	LINEAR	·	2.1 km	MPC · JPL
234527	2001 UD_{141}	—	October 23, 2001	Socorro	LINEAR	EOS	5.8 km	MPC · JPL
234528	2001 US_{141}	—	October 23, 2001	Socorro	LINEAR	·	3.2 km	MPC · JPL
234529	2001 UH_{154}	—	October 23, 2001	Socorro	LINEAR	·	1.5 km	MPC · JPL
234530	2001 UD_{156}	—	October 23, 2001	Socorro	LINEAR	NYS	1.7 km	MPC · JPL
234531	2001 UU_{156}	—	October 23, 2001	Socorro	LINEAR	(6769) ·	2.5 km	MPC · JPL
234532	2001 UG_{159}	—	October 23, 2001	Socorro	LINEAR	·	2.8 km	MPC · JPL
234533	2001 UF_{161}	—	October 23, 2001	Socorro	LINEAR	·	1.2 km	MPC · JPL
234534	2001 UB_{164}	—	October 18, 2001	Palomar	NEAT	·	910 m	MPC · JPL
234535	2001 UB_{198}	—	October 19, 2001	Anderson Mesa	LONEOS	V	860 m	MPC · JPL
234536	2001 UW_{206}	—	October 20, 2001	Socorro	LINEAR	·	5.4 km	MPC · JPL
234537	2001 UP_{207}	—	October 20, 2001	Socorro	LINEAR	·	1.1 km	MPC · JPL
234538	2001 UP_{212}	—	October 21, 2001	Kitt Peak	Spacewatch	V	790 m	MPC · JPL
234539	2001 UO_{217}	—	October 24, 2001	Palomar	NEAT	·	1.1 km	MPC · JPL
234540	2001 UN_{222}	—	October 19, 2001	Kitt Peak	Spacewatch	·	1.4 km	MPC · JPL
234541	2001 UH_{229}	—	October 16, 2001	Palomar	NEAT	·	1.3 km	MPC · JPL
234542	2001 UQ_{229}	—	October 17, 2001	Palomar	NEAT	·	3.3 km	MPC · JPL
234543	2001 VV_{14}	—	November 10, 2001	Socorro	LINEAR	·	1.9 km	MPC · JPL
234544	2001 VK_{19}	—	November 9, 2001	Socorro	LINEAR	·	1.7 km	MPC · JPL
234545	2001 VH_{20}	—	November 9, 2001	Socorro	LINEAR	·	1.4 km	MPC · JPL
234546	2001 VF_{38}	—	November 9, 2001	Socorro	LINEAR	·	2.1 km	MPC · JPL
234547	2001 VE_{59}	—	November 10, 2001	Socorro	LINEAR	·	1.5 km	MPC · JPL
234548	2001 VJ_{60}	—	November 10, 2001	Socorro	LINEAR	·	1.5 km	MPC · JPL
234549	2001 VX_{95}	—	November 15, 2001	Socorro	LINEAR	EMA	5.8 km	MPC · JPL
234550	2001 VT_{115}	—	November 12, 2001	Socorro	LINEAR	NYS	1.4 km	MPC · JPL
234551	2001 VK_{116}	—	November 12, 2001	Socorro	LINEAR	·	1.3 km	MPC · JPL
234552	2001 VR_{119}	—	November 12, 2001	Socorro	LINEAR	·	1.5 km	MPC · JPL
234553	2001 WA_{6}	—	November 17, 2001	Socorro	LINEAR	·	2.1 km	MPC · JPL
234554	2001 WC_{6}	—	November 17, 2001	Socorro	LINEAR	·	2.9 km	MPC · JPL
234555	2001 WU_{6}	—	November 17, 2001	Socorro	LINEAR	V	920 m	MPC · JPL
234556	2001 WU_{17}	—	November 17, 2001	Socorro	LINEAR	·	1.6 km	MPC · JPL
234557	2001 WQ_{24}	—	November 18, 2001	Kitt Peak	Spacewatch	V	850 m	MPC · JPL
234558	2001 WA_{29}	—	November 17, 2001	Socorro	LINEAR	·	1.6 km	MPC · JPL
234559	2001 WL_{45}	—	November 19, 2001	Socorro	LINEAR	·	2.9 km	MPC · JPL
234560	2001 WT_{58}	—	November 19, 2001	Socorro	LINEAR	·	1.3 km	MPC · JPL
234561	2001 WG_{82}	—	November 20, 2001	Socorro	LINEAR	HYG	5.4 km	MPC · JPL
234562	2001 WH_{91}	—	November 21, 2001	Socorro	LINEAR	·	1.5 km	MPC · JPL
234563	2001 XC_{23}	—	December 9, 2001	Socorro	LINEAR	PHO	1.3 km	MPC · JPL
234564	2001 XN_{37}	—	December 9, 2001	Socorro	LINEAR	·	1.7 km	MPC · JPL
234565	2001 XM_{50}	—	December 13, 2001	Socorro	LINEAR	H	820 m	MPC · JPL
234566	2001 XQ_{51}	—	December 10, 2001	Socorro	LINEAR	MAS	880 m	MPC · JPL
234567	2001 XT_{59}	—	December 10, 2001	Socorro	LINEAR	NYS	2.0 km	MPC · JPL
234568	2001 XG_{80}	—	December 11, 2001	Socorro	LINEAR	·	1.7 km	MPC · JPL
234569	2001 XK_{90}	—	December 10, 2001	Socorro	LINEAR	·	1.7 km	MPC · JPL
234570	2001 XZ_{105}	—	December 10, 2001	Socorro	LINEAR	·	2.5 km	MPC · JPL
234571	2001 XO_{107}	—	December 10, 2001	Socorro	LINEAR	·	1.2 km	MPC · JPL
234572	2001 XN_{111}	—	December 11, 2001	Socorro	LINEAR	·	1.9 km	MPC · JPL
234573	2001 XQ_{137}	—	December 14, 2001	Socorro	LINEAR	NYS	1.4 km	MPC · JPL
234574	2001 XR_{140}	—	December 14, 2001	Socorro	LINEAR	·	1.6 km	MPC · JPL
234575	2001 XV_{141}	—	December 14, 2001	Socorro	LINEAR	·	1.1 km	MPC · JPL
234576	2001 XF_{164}	—	December 14, 2001	Socorro	LINEAR	NYS	1.5 km	MPC · JPL
234577	2001 XK_{174}	—	December 14, 2001	Socorro	LINEAR	·	2.7 km	MPC · JPL
234578	2001 XT_{177}	—	December 14, 2001	Socorro	LINEAR	·	1.3 km	MPC · JPL
234579	2001 XH_{217}	—	December 14, 2001	Socorro	LINEAR	NYS	1.7 km	MPC · JPL
234580	2001 XF_{225}	—	December 15, 2001	Socorro	LINEAR	NYS	1.3 km	MPC · JPL
234581	2001 XJ_{231}	—	December 15, 2001	Socorro	LINEAR	·	1.4 km	MPC · JPL
234582	2001 XS_{242}	—	December 14, 2001	Socorro	LINEAR	NYS	1.4 km	MPC · JPL
234583	2001 XG_{250}	—	December 14, 2001	Socorro	LINEAR	NYS	1.8 km	MPC · JPL
234584	2001 XW_{256}	—	December 7, 2001	Socorro	LINEAR	PHO	1.4 km	MPC · JPL
234585	2001 XA_{261}	—	December 11, 2001	Kitt Peak	Spacewatch	·	1.1 km	MPC · JPL
234586	2001 XA_{267}	—	December 13, 2001	Palomar	NEAT	MAS	780 m	MPC · JPL
234587	2001 YU_{10}	—	December 17, 2001	Socorro	LINEAR	H	800 m	MPC · JPL
234588	2001 YU_{25}	—	December 18, 2001	Socorro	LINEAR	MAS · fast	770 m	MPC · JPL
234589	2001 YY_{25}	—	December 18, 2001	Socorro	LINEAR	·	2.2 km	MPC · JPL
234590	2001 YC_{54}	—	December 18, 2001	Socorro	LINEAR	NYS	1.5 km	MPC · JPL
234591	2001 YY_{57}	—	December 18, 2001	Socorro	LINEAR	MAS	830 m	MPC · JPL
234592	2001 YL_{63}	—	December 18, 2001	Socorro	LINEAR	NYS	1.7 km	MPC · JPL
234593	2001 YC_{71}	—	December 18, 2001	Socorro	LINEAR	·	2.1 km	MPC · JPL
234594	2001 YU_{80}	—	December 18, 2001	Socorro	LINEAR	·	2.0 km	MPC · JPL
234595	2001 YB_{89}	—	December 18, 2001	Socorro	LINEAR	·	3.1 km	MPC · JPL
234596	2001 YO_{93}	—	December 18, 2001	Kitt Peak	Spacewatch	MAS	950 m	MPC · JPL
234597	2001 YB_{104}	—	December 17, 2001	Socorro	LINEAR	·	1.7 km	MPC · JPL
234598	2001 YH_{107}	—	December 17, 2001	Socorro	LINEAR	·	2.1 km	MPC · JPL
234599	2001 YZ_{125}	—	December 17, 2001	Socorro	LINEAR	·	2.2 km	MPC · JPL
234600	2001 YU_{139}	—	December 24, 2001	Haleakala	NEAT	·	2.8 km	MPC · JPL

== 234601–234700 ==
back to top

Designation			Discovery			Properties		Ref
Permanent	Provisional	Named after	Date	Site	Discoverer(s)	Category	Diam.	Ref
234601	2001 YV_{152}	—	December 19, 2001	Palomar	NEAT	·	3.6 km	MPC · JPL
234602	2001 YS_{161}	—	December 19, 2001	Palomar	NEAT	·	4.2 km	MPC · JPL
234603	2002 AT_{37}	—	January 9, 2002	Socorro	LINEAR	V	880 m	MPC · JPL
234604	2002 AS_{43}	—	January 9, 2002	Socorro	LINEAR	·	2.9 km	MPC · JPL
234605	2002 AO_{45}	—	January 9, 2002	Socorro	LINEAR	·	3.1 km	MPC · JPL
234606	2002 AG_{46}	—	January 9, 2002	Socorro	LINEAR	NYS	1.1 km	MPC · JPL
234607	2002 AN_{47}	—	January 9, 2002	Socorro	LINEAR	·	2.0 km	MPC · JPL
234608	2002 AW_{50}	—	January 9, 2002	Socorro	LINEAR	NYS	1.4 km	MPC · JPL
234609	2002 AA_{54}	—	January 9, 2002	Socorro	LINEAR	NYS	1.4 km	MPC · JPL
234610	2002 AG_{56}	—	January 9, 2002	Socorro	LINEAR	V	1.0 km	MPC · JPL
234611	2002 AN_{67}	—	January 9, 2002	Campo Imperatore	CINEOS	NYS	1.3 km	MPC · JPL
234612	2002 AZ_{78}	—	January 8, 2002	Socorro	LINEAR	·	1.3 km	MPC · JPL
234613	2002 AZ_{87}	—	January 9, 2002	Socorro	LINEAR	NYS	1.5 km	MPC · JPL
234614	2002 AC_{91}	—	January 13, 2002	Socorro	LINEAR	MAS	770 m	MPC · JPL
234615	2002 AV_{95}	—	January 8, 2002	Socorro	LINEAR	·	2.0 km	MPC · JPL
234616	2002 AU_{96}	—	January 8, 2002	Socorro	LINEAR	·	1.7 km	MPC · JPL
234617	2002 AZ_{99}	—	January 8, 2002	Socorro	LINEAR	·	2.1 km	MPC · JPL
234618	2002 AH_{100}	—	January 8, 2002	Socorro	LINEAR	·	2.0 km	MPC · JPL
234619	2002 AN_{106}	—	January 9, 2002	Socorro	LINEAR	NYS	1.3 km	MPC · JPL
234620	2002 AZ_{131}	—	January 8, 2002	Socorro	LINEAR	(5)	1.5 km	MPC · JPL
234621	2002 AH_{145}	—	January 13, 2002	Socorro	LINEAR	NYS · fast ·	2.4 km	MPC · JPL
234622	2002 AL_{146}	—	January 13, 2002	Socorro	LINEAR	·	1.5 km	MPC · JPL
234623	2002 AA_{173}	—	January 14, 2002	Socorro	LINEAR	PHO	1.8 km	MPC · JPL
234624	2002 AH_{187}	—	January 8, 2002	Socorro	LINEAR	·	1.7 km	MPC · JPL
234625	2002 AL_{199}	—	January 8, 2002	Socorro	LINEAR	·	2.0 km	MPC · JPL
234626	2002 AK_{201}	—	January 14, 2002	Socorro	LINEAR	·	1.7 km	MPC · JPL
234627	2002 BA_{11}	—	January 18, 2002	Socorro	LINEAR	·	2.3 km	MPC · JPL
234628	2002 BS_{14}	—	January 19, 2002	Socorro	LINEAR	ERI	2.9 km	MPC · JPL
234629	2002 BX_{24}	—	January 23, 2002	Socorro	LINEAR	·	2.1 km	MPC · JPL
234630	2002 CD_{1}	—	February 2, 2002	Cima Ekar	ADAS	·	2.1 km	MPC · JPL
234631	2002 CL_{11}	—	February 6, 2002	Oaxaca	Roe, J. M.	·	1.3 km	MPC · JPL
234632	2002 CP_{11}	—	February 6, 2002	Palomar	NEAT	H	790 m	MPC · JPL
234633	2002 CG_{12}	—	February 7, 2002	Socorro	LINEAR	H	840 m	MPC · JPL
234634	2002 CL_{15}	—	February 8, 2002	Črni Vrh	Mikuž, H.	·	1.7 km	MPC · JPL
234635	2002 CE_{18}	—	February 6, 2002	Socorro	LINEAR	V	1.2 km	MPC · JPL
234636	2002 CD_{38}	—	February 7, 2002	Socorro	LINEAR	·	3.9 km	MPC · JPL
234637	2002 CP_{46}	—	February 7, 2002	Bohyunsan	Bohyunsan	·	1.3 km	MPC · JPL
234638	2002 CS_{46}	—	February 10, 2002	Socorro	LINEAR	·	2.1 km	MPC · JPL
234639	2002 CU_{82}	—	February 7, 2002	Socorro	LINEAR	NYS	1.8 km	MPC · JPL
234640	2002 CL_{117}	—	February 9, 2002	Anderson Mesa	LONEOS	·	3.0 km	MPC · JPL
234641	2002 CA_{128}	—	February 7, 2002	Socorro	LINEAR	MAS	950 m	MPC · JPL
234642	2002 CB_{178}	—	February 10, 2002	Socorro	LINEAR	MAS	860 m	MPC · JPL
234643	2002 CH_{179}	—	February 10, 2002	Socorro	LINEAR	MAS	920 m	MPC · JPL
234644	2002 CG_{180}	—	February 10, 2002	Socorro	LINEAR	·	2.4 km	MPC · JPL
234645	2002 CJ_{185}	—	February 10, 2002	Socorro	LINEAR	·	1.9 km	MPC · JPL
234646	2002 CC_{198}	—	February 10, 2002	Socorro	LINEAR	MAS	740 m	MPC · JPL
234647	2002 CX_{251}	—	February 3, 2002	Palomar	NEAT	·	1.9 km	MPC · JPL
234648	2002 CH_{254}	—	February 5, 2002	Palomar	NEAT	·	1.8 km	MPC · JPL
234649	2002 CE_{275}	—	February 9, 2002	Kitt Peak	Spacewatch	·	2.2 km	MPC · JPL
234650	2002 CH_{304}	—	February 14, 2002	Kitt Peak	Spacewatch	T_{j} (2.99) · 3:2	6.5 km	MPC · JPL
234651	2002 CW_{304}	—	February 15, 2002	Bohyunsan	Bohyunsan	·	1.5 km	MPC · JPL
234652	2002 DL_{19}	—	February 24, 2002	Palomar	NEAT	H	700 m	MPC · JPL
234653	2002 EN_{5}	—	March 9, 2002	Socorro	LINEAR	H	800 m	MPC · JPL
234654	2002 EP_{8}	—	March 11, 2002	Cima Ekar	ADAS	·	3.2 km	MPC · JPL
234655	2002 EJ_{38}	—	March 12, 2002	Kitt Peak	Spacewatch	NYS	2.8 km	MPC · JPL
234656	2002 EN_{53}	—	March 13, 2002	Socorro	LINEAR	·	1.3 km	MPC · JPL
234657	2002 EJ_{103}	—	March 9, 2002	Kitt Peak	Spacewatch	·	4.7 km	MPC · JPL
234658	2002 ER_{103}	—	March 9, 2002	Kitt Peak	Spacewatch	·	1.2 km	MPC · JPL
234659	2002 EG_{115}	—	March 10, 2002	Anderson Mesa	LONEOS	·	1.6 km	MPC · JPL
234660	2002 ET_{128}	—	March 12, 2002	Palomar	NEAT	·	1.7 km	MPC · JPL
234661	2002 EH_{134}	—	March 13, 2002	Socorro	LINEAR	·	2.3 km	MPC · JPL
234662	2002 EJ_{136}	—	March 12, 2002	Kitt Peak	Spacewatch	·	1.4 km	MPC · JPL
234663	2002 EO_{145}	—	March 13, 2002	Socorro	LINEAR	·	1.7 km	MPC · JPL
234664	2002 EP_{146}	—	March 14, 2002	Anderson Mesa	LONEOS	·	1.8 km	MPC · JPL
234665	2002 ER_{148}	—	March 15, 2002	Palomar	NEAT	·	1.9 km	MPC · JPL
234666	2002 FH_{12}	—	March 16, 2002	Socorro	LINEAR	·	2.0 km	MPC · JPL
234667	2002 FW_{28}	—	March 20, 2002	Socorro	LINEAR	ADE	5.3 km	MPC · JPL
234668	2002 FT_{33}	—	March 20, 2002	Socorro	LINEAR	·	2.0 km	MPC · JPL
234669	2002 FW_{34}	—	March 20, 2002	Anderson Mesa	LONEOS	·	1.7 km	MPC · JPL
234670	2002 GM	—	April 2, 2002	Kvistaberg	Uppsala-DLR Asteroid Survey	H	850 m	MPC · JPL
234671	2002 GA_{5}	—	April 8, 2002	Palomar	NEAT	H	680 m	MPC · JPL
234672	2002 GE_{14}	—	April 14, 2002	Socorro	LINEAR	·	1.5 km	MPC · JPL
234673	2002 GQ_{14}	—	April 15, 2002	Socorro	LINEAR	H	1.1 km	MPC · JPL
234674	2002 GP_{38}	—	April 2, 2002	Kitt Peak	Spacewatch	HIL · 3:2	7.7 km	MPC · JPL
234675	2002 GY_{41}	—	April 4, 2002	Palomar	NEAT	KON	3.1 km	MPC · JPL
234676	2002 GA_{52}	—	April 5, 2002	Palomar	NEAT	·	1.5 km	MPC · JPL
234677	2002 GH_{52}	—	April 5, 2002	Anderson Mesa	LONEOS	·	3.6 km	MPC · JPL
234678	2002 GJ_{64}	—	April 8, 2002	Palomar	NEAT	·	1.7 km	MPC · JPL
234679	2002 GW_{64}	—	April 8, 2002	Palomar	NEAT	·	2.3 km	MPC · JPL
234680	2002 GQ_{66}	—	April 8, 2002	Palomar	NEAT	·	1.9 km	MPC · JPL
234681	2002 GT_{82}	—	April 10, 2002	Socorro	LINEAR	·	1.7 km	MPC · JPL
234682	2002 GF_{83}	—	April 10, 2002	Socorro	LINEAR	·	2.1 km	MPC · JPL
234683	2002 GF_{85}	—	April 10, 2002	Socorro	LINEAR	·	2.8 km	MPC · JPL
234684	2002 GD_{89}	—	April 10, 2002	Palomar	NEAT	·	1.3 km	MPC · JPL
234685	2002 GS_{97}	—	April 9, 2002	Kitt Peak	Spacewatch	MIS	2.2 km	MPC · JPL
234686	2002 GJ_{99}	—	April 10, 2002	Socorro	LINEAR	·	1.2 km	MPC · JPL
234687	2002 GD_{101}	—	April 10, 2002	Socorro	LINEAR	·	2.4 km	MPC · JPL
234688	2002 GE_{104}	—	April 10, 2002	Socorro	LINEAR	·	2.6 km	MPC · JPL
234689	2002 GC_{110}	—	April 10, 2002	Socorro	LINEAR	·	2.7 km	MPC · JPL
234690	2002 GG_{110}	—	April 10, 2002	Palomar	NEAT	·	3.6 km	MPC · JPL
234691	2002 GO_{115}	—	April 11, 2002	Socorro	LINEAR	·	1.4 km	MPC · JPL
234692	2002 GG_{121}	—	April 12, 2002	Palomar	NEAT	·	1.5 km	MPC · JPL
234693	2002 GD_{124}	—	April 12, 2002	Socorro	LINEAR	·	2.4 km	MPC · JPL
234694	2002 GG_{125}	—	April 12, 2002	Socorro	LINEAR	(5)	2.0 km	MPC · JPL
234695	2002 GF_{129}	—	April 12, 2002	Socorro	LINEAR	·	1.6 km	MPC · JPL
234696	2002 GW_{129}	—	April 12, 2002	Socorro	LINEAR	·	1.5 km	MPC · JPL
234697	2002 GJ_{134}	—	April 12, 2002	Socorro	LINEAR	·	2.2 km	MPC · JPL
234698	2002 GP_{143}	—	April 13, 2002	Palomar	NEAT	·	1.9 km	MPC · JPL
234699	2002 GR_{144}	—	April 11, 2002	Palomar	NEAT	EUN	1.8 km	MPC · JPL
234700	2002 GW_{144}	—	April 12, 2002	Palomar	NEAT	PAD	3.2 km	MPC · JPL

== 234701–234800 ==
back to top

Designation			Discovery			Properties		Ref
Permanent	Provisional	Named after	Date	Site	Discoverer(s)	Category	Diam.	Ref
234701	2002 GW_{146}	—	April 13, 2002	Palomar	NEAT	·	1.6 km	MPC · JPL
234702	2002 GT_{158}	—	April 13, 2002	Palomar	NEAT	·	1.5 km	MPC · JPL
234703	2002 GJ_{159}	—	April 14, 2002	Socorro	LINEAR	·	2.5 km	MPC · JPL
234704	2002 GG_{163}	—	April 14, 2002	Palomar	NEAT	·	3.3 km	MPC · JPL
234705	2002 GG_{169}	—	April 9, 2002	Socorro	LINEAR	·	1.8 km	MPC · JPL
234706	2002 GQ_{171}	—	April 10, 2002	Socorro	LINEAR	·	1.8 km	MPC · JPL
234707	2002 HB_{10}	—	April 17, 2002	Socorro	LINEAR	·	2.3 km	MPC · JPL
234708	2002 HZ_{12}	—	April 21, 2002	Socorro	LINEAR	H	920 m	MPC · JPL
234709	2002 JC_{7}	—	May 3, 2002	Palomar	NEAT	·	1.5 km	MPC · JPL
234710	2002 JD_{8}	—	May 6, 2002	Palomar	NEAT	·	2.2 km	MPC · JPL
234711	2002 JD_{16}	—	May 7, 2002	Palomar	NEAT	·	2.5 km	MPC · JPL
234712	2002 JY_{18}	—	May 7, 2002	Palomar	NEAT	·	1.6 km	MPC · JPL
234713	2002 JT_{36}	—	May 7, 2002	Anderson Mesa	LONEOS	·	3.1 km	MPC · JPL
234714	2002 JX_{67}	—	May 11, 2002	Tebbutt	F. B. Zoltowski	·	2.6 km	MPC · JPL
234715	2002 JJ_{83}	—	May 11, 2002	Socorro	LINEAR	JUN	1.8 km	MPC · JPL
234716	2002 JY_{85}	—	May 11, 2002	Socorro	LINEAR	HOF	3.5 km	MPC · JPL
234717	2002 JM_{94}	—	May 11, 2002	Socorro	LINEAR	·	1.9 km	MPC · JPL
234718	2002 JD_{99}	—	May 13, 2002	Palomar	NEAT	·	2.2 km	MPC · JPL
234719	2002 JB_{119}	—	May 5, 2002	Anderson Mesa	LONEOS	·	2.2 km	MPC · JPL
234720	2002 JF_{119}	—	May 5, 2002	Anderson Mesa	LONEOS	·	2.8 km	MPC · JPL
234721	2002 JC_{120}	—	May 5, 2002	Palomar	NEAT	MAR	1.7 km	MPC · JPL
234722	2002 JU_{127}	—	May 7, 2002	Palomar	NEAT	EUN	1.7 km	MPC · JPL
234723	2002 JR_{136}	—	May 9, 2002	Palomar	NEAT	·	2.3 km	MPC · JPL
234724	2002 JL_{144}	—	May 13, 2002	Socorro	LINEAR	·	1.8 km	MPC · JPL
234725	2002 KL_{8}	—	May 21, 2002	Socorro	LINEAR	·	4.0 km	MPC · JPL
234726	2002 KN_{11}	—	May 17, 2002	Kitt Peak	Spacewatch	WIT	1.4 km	MPC · JPL
234727	2002 KK_{12}	—	May 17, 2002	Kitt Peak	Spacewatch	·	2.1 km	MPC · JPL
234728	2002 KB_{16}	—	May 19, 2002	Palomar	NEAT	·	1.7 km	MPC · JPL
234729	2002 KF_{16}	—	May 23, 2002	Palomar	NEAT	·	2.9 km	MPC · JPL
234730	2002 LW_{1}	—	June 2, 2002	Palomar	NEAT	·	3.0 km	MPC · JPL
234731	2002 LT_{22}	—	June 8, 2002	Socorro	LINEAR	·	3.5 km	MPC · JPL
234732	2002 LH_{31}	—	June 3, 2002	Palomar	NEAT	·	1.4 km	MPC · JPL
234733	2002 LW_{32}	—	June 3, 2002	Palomar	NEAT	·	3.3 km	MPC · JPL
234734	2002 LD_{34}	—	June 10, 2002	Socorro	LINEAR	·	2.2 km	MPC · JPL
234735	2002 LB_{37}	—	June 9, 2002	Socorro	LINEAR	·	2.8 km	MPC · JPL
234736	2002 LW_{41}	—	June 10, 2002	Socorro	LINEAR	·	2.3 km	MPC · JPL
234737	2002 LO_{47}	—	June 12, 2002	Socorro	LINEAR	·	2.1 km	MPC · JPL
234738	2002 LH_{53}	—	June 8, 2002	Socorro	LINEAR	(5)	4.5 km	MPC · JPL
234739	2002 LO_{54}	—	June 8, 2002	Kitt Peak	Spacewatch	·	1.8 km	MPC · JPL
234740	2002 LL_{57}	—	June 11, 2002	Kitt Peak	Spacewatch	·	2.6 km	MPC · JPL
234741	2002 LH_{59}	—	June 10, 2002	Palomar	NEAT	·	1.9 km	MPC · JPL
234742	2002 LM_{62}	—	June 12, 2002	Palomar	NEAT	·	6.3 km	MPC · JPL
234743	2002 NM_{11}	—	July 4, 2002	Palomar	NEAT	·	3.4 km	MPC · JPL
234744	2002 NT_{15}	—	July 5, 2002	Socorro	LINEAR	JUN	1.4 km	MPC · JPL
234745	2002 NP_{17}	—	July 12, 2002	Palomar	NEAT	·	2.5 km	MPC · JPL
234746	2002 NF_{40}	—	July 14, 2002	Palomar	NEAT	·	2.6 km	MPC · JPL
234747	2002 NX_{43}	—	July 12, 2002	Palomar	NEAT	MAR	1.6 km	MPC · JPL
234748	2002 NH_{57}	—	July 12, 2002	Palomar	Stoss, R.	·	2.6 km	MPC · JPL
234749	2002 NF_{61}	—	July 6, 2002	Palomar	NEAT	·	2.6 km	MPC · JPL
234750 Amymainzer	2002 NX_{69}	Amymainzer	July 8, 2002	Palomar	NEAT	·	7.5 km	MPC · JPL
234751	2002 ND_{70}	—	July 14, 2002	Palomar	NEAT	EOS	5.2 km	MPC · JPL
234752	2002 NG_{72}	—	July 12, 2002	Palomar	NEAT	WIT	1.2 km	MPC · JPL
234753	2002 OQ_{1}	—	July 17, 2002	Socorro	LINEAR	·	6.0 km	MPC · JPL
234754	2002 OY_{4}	—	July 19, 2002	Palomar	NEAT	·	2.1 km	MPC · JPL
234755	2002 OQ_{5}	—	July 20, 2002	Palomar	NEAT	·	4.7 km	MPC · JPL
234756	2002 OX_{15}	—	July 18, 2002	Socorro	LINEAR	·	3.3 km	MPC · JPL
234757	2002 OH_{17}	—	July 18, 2002	Socorro	LINEAR	·	2.2 km	MPC · JPL
234758	2002 OD_{29}	—	July 18, 2002	Palomar	NEAT	·	2.4 km	MPC · JPL
234759	2002 OB_{30}	—	July 16, 2002	Palomar	NEAT	·	1.7 km	MPC · JPL
234760	2002 OC_{31}	—	July 20, 2002	Palomar	NEAT	·	6.4 km	MPC · JPL
234761 Rainerkracht	2002 OU_{32}	Rainerkracht	July 22, 2002	Palomar	NEAT	·	1.9 km	MPC · JPL
234762	2002 PL_{1}	—	August 4, 2002	Socorro	LINEAR	·	3.5 km	MPC · JPL
234763	2002 PX_{9}	—	August 5, 2002	Palomar	NEAT	·	5.0 km	MPC · JPL
234764	2002 PL_{21}	—	August 6, 2002	Palomar	NEAT	·	4.6 km	MPC · JPL
234765	2002 PJ_{29}	—	August 6, 2002	Palomar	NEAT	·	3.0 km	MPC · JPL
234766	2002 PU_{41}	—	August 5, 2002	Socorro	LINEAR	·	4.2 km	MPC · JPL
234767	2002 PG_{49}	—	August 10, 2002	Socorro	LINEAR	·	3.6 km	MPC · JPL
234768	2002 PT_{66}	—	August 6, 2002	Palomar	NEAT	URS	6.1 km	MPC · JPL
234769	2002 PP_{68}	—	August 6, 2002	Palomar	NEAT	HOF	4.0 km	MPC · JPL
234770	2002 PX_{74}	—	August 12, 2002	Socorro	LINEAR	·	4.2 km	MPC · JPL
234771	2002 PN_{76}	—	August 11, 2002	Palomar	NEAT	·	3.5 km	MPC · JPL
234772	2002 PP_{98}	—	August 14, 2002	Socorro	LINEAR	·	2.9 km	MPC · JPL
234773	2002 PE_{111}	—	August 13, 2002	Anderson Mesa	LONEOS	·	5.0 km	MPC · JPL
234774	2002 PM_{117}	—	August 15, 2002	Socorro	LINEAR	·	3.7 km	MPC · JPL
234775	2002 PQ_{133}	—	August 14, 2002	Socorro	LINEAR	·	2.6 km	MPC · JPL
234776	2002 PP_{139}	—	August 12, 2002	Haleakala	NEAT	·	3.2 km	MPC · JPL
234777	2002 PV_{157}	—	August 8, 2002	Palomar	S. F. Hönig	·	4.4 km	MPC · JPL
234778	2002 PW_{162}	—	August 8, 2002	Palomar	S. F. Hönig	HOF	3.0 km	MPC · JPL
234779	2002 PQ_{169}	—	August 8, 2002	Palomar	NEAT	·	2.1 km	MPC · JPL
234780	2002 PK_{178}	—	August 15, 2002	Palomar	NEAT	·	3.3 km	MPC · JPL
234781	2002 PP_{184}	—	August 8, 2002	Palomar	NEAT	·	2.2 km	MPC · JPL
234782	2002 PX_{184}	—	August 7, 2002	Palomar	NEAT	·	3.7 km	MPC · JPL
234783	2002 PJ_{186}	—	August 11, 2002	Palomar	NEAT	·	2.8 km	MPC · JPL
234784	2002 PN_{188}	—	August 8, 2002	Palomar	NEAT	AGN	1.7 km	MPC · JPL
234785	2002 PS_{188}	—	August 8, 2002	Palomar	NEAT	KOR	1.4 km	MPC · JPL
234786	2002 QY_{3}	—	August 16, 2002	Palomar	NEAT	·	2.1 km	MPC · JPL
234787	2002 QL_{4}	—	August 16, 2002	Haleakala	NEAT	TEL	1.9 km	MPC · JPL
234788	2002 QD_{20}	—	August 28, 2002	Palomar	NEAT	·	3.0 km	MPC · JPL
234789	2002 QV_{22}	—	August 27, 2002	Palomar	NEAT	VER	6.0 km	MPC · JPL
234790	2002 QE_{23}	—	August 27, 2002	Palomar	NEAT	EOS	2.5 km	MPC · JPL
234791	2002 QN_{37}	—	August 30, 2002	Kitt Peak	Spacewatch	KOR	1.6 km	MPC · JPL
234792	2002 QR_{47}	—	August 29, 2002	Palomar	NEAT	·	3.1 km	MPC · JPL
234793	2002 QF_{50}	—	August 29, 2002	Palomar	R. Matson	·	3.0 km	MPC · JPL
234794	2002 QX_{53}	—	August 29, 2002	Palomar	S. F. Hönig	·	5.3 km	MPC · JPL
234795	2002 QR_{61}	—	August 27, 2002	Palomar	NEAT	KOR	1.8 km	MPC · JPL
234796	2002 QK_{62}	—	August 17, 2002	Palomar	NEAT	·	2.9 km	MPC · JPL
234797	2002 QZ_{62}	—	August 29, 2002	Palomar	NEAT	MRX	1.3 km	MPC · JPL
234798	2002 QO_{69}	—	August 27, 2002	Palomar	NEAT	KOR	2.2 km	MPC · JPL
234799	2002 QV_{71}	—	August 27, 2002	Palomar	NEAT	AGN	1.8 km	MPC · JPL
234800	2002 QQ_{73}	—	August 30, 2002	Palomar	NEAT	MRX	1.4 km	MPC · JPL

== 234801–234900 ==
back to top

Designation			Discovery			Properties		Ref
Permanent	Provisional	Named after	Date	Site	Discoverer(s)	Category	Diam.	Ref
234801	2002 QB_{78}	—	August 27, 2002	Palomar	NEAT	·	2.6 km	MPC · JPL
234802	2002 QN_{78}	—	August 29, 2002	Palomar	NEAT	·	2.3 km	MPC · JPL
234803	2002 QT_{78}	—	August 26, 2002	Palomar	NEAT	·	5.2 km	MPC · JPL
234804	2002 QD_{83}	—	August 16, 2002	Palomar	NEAT	·	4.0 km	MPC · JPL
234805	2002 QY_{85}	—	August 19, 2002	Palomar	NEAT	·	2.6 km	MPC · JPL
234806	2002 QN_{88}	—	August 19, 2002	Palomar	NEAT	AGN	1.7 km	MPC · JPL
234807	2002 QK_{94}	—	August 29, 2002	Palomar	NEAT	·	6.1 km	MPC · JPL
234808	2002 QT_{95}	—	August 18, 2002	Palomar	NEAT	·	2.8 km	MPC · JPL
234809	2002 QV_{97}	—	August 18, 2002	Palomar	Palomar	·	2.6 km	MPC · JPL
234810	2002 QX_{100}	—	August 19, 2002	Palomar	NEAT	BRA	1.6 km	MPC · JPL
234811	2002 QU_{101}	—	August 20, 2002	Palomar	NEAT	TIR	2.7 km	MPC · JPL
234812	2002 QQ_{102}	—	August 19, 2002	Palomar	NEAT	·	2.7 km	MPC · JPL
234813	2002 QJ_{112}	—	August 17, 2002	Palomar	NEAT	·	2.4 km	MPC · JPL
234814	2002 QD_{114}	—	August 28, 2002	Palomar	NEAT	·	2.9 km	MPC · JPL
234815	2002 QN_{114}	—	August 28, 2002	Palomar	NEAT	EOS	2.2 km	MPC · JPL
234816	2002 QG_{128}	—	August 29, 2002	Palomar	NEAT	·	2.6 km	MPC · JPL
234817	2002 QT_{132}	—	August 28, 2002	Palomar	NEAT	·	5.6 km	MPC · JPL
234818	2002 QL_{136}	—	August 18, 2002	Palomar	NEAT	KOR	1.6 km	MPC · JPL
234819	2002 RS_{17}	—	September 4, 2002	Anderson Mesa	LONEOS	·	2.7 km	MPC · JPL
234820	2002 RV_{21}	—	September 4, 2002	Anderson Mesa	LONEOS	·	4.2 km	MPC · JPL
234821	2002 RT_{34}	—	September 4, 2002	Anderson Mesa	LONEOS	·	2.6 km	MPC · JPL
234822	2002 RC_{45}	—	September 5, 2002	Socorro	LINEAR	·	3.6 km	MPC · JPL
234823	2002 RP_{58}	—	September 5, 2002	Anderson Mesa	LONEOS	·	2.7 km	MPC · JPL
234824	2002 RV_{73}	—	September 5, 2002	Socorro	LINEAR	·	3.9 km	MPC · JPL
234825	2002 RV_{79}	—	September 5, 2002	Socorro	LINEAR	·	2.2 km	MPC · JPL
234826	2002 RM_{83}	—	September 5, 2002	Socorro	LINEAR	EOS	3.1 km	MPC · JPL
234827	2002 RE_{87}	—	September 5, 2002	Socorro	LINEAR	·	3.9 km	MPC · JPL
234828	2002 RG_{89}	—	September 5, 2002	Socorro	LINEAR	·	2.8 km	MPC · JPL
234829	2002 RB_{98}	—	September 5, 2002	Socorro	LINEAR	(18466)	3.6 km	MPC · JPL
234830	2002 RB_{110}	—	September 6, 2002	Socorro	LINEAR	·	4.6 km	MPC · JPL
234831	2002 RG_{120}	—	September 3, 2002	Campo Imperatore	CINEOS	·	4.4 km	MPC · JPL
234832	2002 RF_{125}	—	September 9, 2002	Campo Imperatore	CINEOS	·	3.9 km	MPC · JPL
234833	2002 RG_{132}	—	September 11, 2002	Palomar	NEAT	NAE	6.1 km	MPC · JPL
234834	2002 RV_{139}	—	September 10, 2002	Palomar	NEAT	TIR ·	5.8 km	MPC · JPL
234835	2002 RJ_{140}	—	September 11, 2002	Haleakala	NEAT	·	3.7 km	MPC · JPL
234836	2002 RJ_{144}	—	September 11, 2002	Palomar	NEAT	·	2.9 km	MPC · JPL
234837	2002 RT_{144}	—	September 11, 2002	Palomar	NEAT	KOR	1.9 km	MPC · JPL
234838	2002 RL_{145}	—	September 11, 2002	Palomar	NEAT	KOR	2.3 km	MPC · JPL
234839	2002 RQ_{150}	—	September 11, 2002	Haleakala	NEAT	EOS	2.8 km	MPC · JPL
234840	2002 RZ_{161}	—	September 12, 2002	Palomar	NEAT	·	2.9 km	MPC · JPL
234841	2002 RM_{174}	—	September 13, 2002	Palomar	NEAT	·	3.6 km	MPC · JPL
234842	2002 RY_{177}	—	September 13, 2002	Palomar	NEAT	·	2.9 km	MPC · JPL
234843	2002 RT_{179}	—	September 14, 2002	Kitt Peak	Spacewatch	THM	2.4 km	MPC · JPL
234844	2002 RL_{181}	—	September 13, 2002	Palomar	NEAT	T_{j} (2.99) · EUP	4.3 km	MPC · JPL
234845	2002 RJ_{182}	—	September 11, 2002	Palomar	NEAT	·	6.0 km	MPC · JPL
234846	2002 RB_{187}	—	September 13, 2002	Socorro	LINEAR	·	3.9 km	MPC · JPL
234847	2002 RF_{187}	—	September 13, 2002	Palomar	NEAT	EUP	5.8 km	MPC · JPL
234848	2002 RN_{193}	—	September 12, 2002	Palomar	NEAT	·	3.5 km	MPC · JPL
234849	2002 RH_{194}	—	September 12, 2002	Palomar	NEAT	·	2.8 km	MPC · JPL
234850	2002 RG_{209}	—	September 14, 2002	Palomar	NEAT	·	2.3 km	MPC · JPL
234851	2002 RG_{215}	—	September 13, 2002	Socorro	LINEAR	·	5.9 km	MPC · JPL
234852	2002 RD_{216}	—	September 13, 2002	Anderson Mesa	LONEOS	·	5.0 km	MPC · JPL
234853	2002 RU_{220}	—	September 15, 2002	Palomar	NEAT	·	2.8 km	MPC · JPL
234854	2002 RJ_{228}	—	September 14, 2002	Haleakala	NEAT	·	5.1 km	MPC · JPL
234855	2002 RZ_{228}	—	September 14, 2002	Palomar	NEAT	·	3.5 km	MPC · JPL
234856	2002 RQ_{232}	—	September 11, 2002	Palomar	White, M., M. Collins	·	3.4 km	MPC · JPL
234857	2002 RR_{235}	—	September 11, 2002	Palomar	White, M., M. Collins	·	2.7 km	MPC · JPL
234858	2002 RK_{238}	—	September 12, 2002	Palomar	R. Matson	·	2.9 km	MPC · JPL
234859	2002 RH_{246}	—	September 1, 2002	Palomar	NEAT	·	2.4 km	MPC · JPL
234860	2002 RL_{253}	—	September 14, 2002	Palomar	NEAT	·	3.1 km	MPC · JPL
234861	2002 RP_{259}	—	September 15, 2002	Palomar	NEAT	·	1.9 km	MPC · JPL
234862	2002 RA_{262}	—	September 13, 2002	Palomar	NEAT	·	3.8 km	MPC · JPL
234863	2002 RD_{262}	—	September 13, 2002	Palomar	NEAT	·	2.3 km	MPC · JPL
234864	2002 RN_{267}	—	September 14, 2002	Palomar	NEAT	·	2.1 km	MPC · JPL
234865	2002 RK_{268}	—	September 4, 2002	Palomar	NEAT	AST	3.8 km	MPC · JPL
234866	2002 RQ_{270}	—	September 4, 2002	Palomar	NEAT	·	1.9 km	MPC · JPL
234867	2002 SS_{23}	—	September 27, 2002	Palomar	NEAT	·	3.6 km	MPC · JPL
234868	2002 SD_{25}	—	September 28, 2002	Haleakala	NEAT	·	5.5 km	MPC · JPL
234869	2002 SC_{27}	—	September 29, 2002	Haleakala	NEAT	EOS	3.8 km	MPC · JPL
234870	2002 SD_{27}	—	September 29, 2002	Haleakala	NEAT	·	3.2 km	MPC · JPL
234871	2002 SK_{28}	—	September 30, 2002	Ondřejov	P. Pravec	·	4.8 km	MPC · JPL
234872	2002 SO_{29}	—	September 28, 2002	Palomar	NEAT	·	3.4 km	MPC · JPL
234873	2002 SJ_{48}	—	September 30, 2002	Socorro	LINEAR	·	2.7 km	MPC · JPL
234874	2002 SW_{60}	—	September 16, 2002	Palomar	NEAT	·	3.0 km	MPC · JPL
234875	2002 SB_{61}	—	September 16, 2002	Palomar	NEAT	·	3.4 km	MPC · JPL
234876	2002 SZ_{64}	—	September 16, 2002	Palomar	NEAT	·	2.1 km	MPC · JPL
234877	2002 TT	—	October 1, 2002	Anderson Mesa	LONEOS	·	4.3 km	MPC · JPL
234878	2002 TF_{30}	—	October 2, 2002	Socorro	LINEAR	·	4.6 km	MPC · JPL
234879	2002 TG_{43}	—	October 2, 2002	Haleakala	NEAT	EOS	2.8 km	MPC · JPL
234880	2002 TK_{43}	—	October 2, 2002	Socorro	LINEAR	·	4.3 km	MPC · JPL
234881	2002 TS_{50}	—	October 2, 2002	Socorro	LINEAR	CYB	7.0 km	MPC · JPL
234882	2002 TD_{56}	—	October 1, 2002	Anderson Mesa	LONEOS	EOS	2.8 km	MPC · JPL
234883	2002 TW_{61}	—	October 3, 2002	Campo Imperatore	CINEOS	·	3.7 km	MPC · JPL
234884	2002 TR_{74}	—	October 1, 2002	Anderson Mesa	LONEOS	·	3.3 km	MPC · JPL
234885	2002 TC_{81}	—	October 1, 2002	Socorro	LINEAR	EOS	3.1 km	MPC · JPL
234886	2002 TL_{88}	—	October 3, 2002	Palomar	NEAT	slow	5.3 km	MPC · JPL
234887	2002 TB_{100}	—	October 4, 2002	Anderson Mesa	LONEOS	TIR	4.0 km	MPC · JPL
234888	2002 TW_{106}	—	October 2, 2002	Socorro	LINEAR	EOS	2.7 km	MPC · JPL
234889	2002 TB_{113}	—	October 3, 2002	Socorro	LINEAR	CYB	5.7 km	MPC · JPL
234890	2002 TP_{113}	—	October 3, 2002	Palomar	NEAT	·	3.9 km	MPC · JPL
234891	2002 TM_{116}	—	October 3, 2002	Palomar	NEAT	·	7.2 km	MPC · JPL
234892	2002 TC_{128}	—	October 4, 2002	Palomar	NEAT	EOS	3.2 km	MPC · JPL
234893	2002 TH_{135}	—	October 4, 2002	Palomar	NEAT	·	3.8 km	MPC · JPL
234894	2002 TA_{137}	—	October 4, 2002	Anderson Mesa	LONEOS	EOS	3.2 km	MPC · JPL
234895	2002 TJ_{146}	—	October 4, 2002	Socorro	LINEAR	EOS	3.0 km	MPC · JPL
234896	2002 TM_{160}	—	October 5, 2002	Palomar	NEAT	·	4.9 km	MPC · JPL
234897	2002 TH_{171}	—	October 3, 2002	Palomar	NEAT	LUT	5.3 km	MPC · JPL
234898	2002 TK_{177}	—	October 5, 2002	Palomar	NEAT	·	5.3 km	MPC · JPL
234899	2002 TO_{185}	—	October 4, 2002	Socorro	LINEAR	·	4.1 km	MPC · JPL
234900	2002 TM_{189}	—	October 5, 2002	Socorro	LINEAR	LIX	5.6 km	MPC · JPL

== 234901–235000 ==
back to top

Designation			Discovery			Properties		Ref
Permanent	Provisional	Named after	Date	Site	Discoverer(s)	Category	Diam.	Ref
234901	2002 TG_{194}	—	October 3, 2002	Socorro	LINEAR	·	3.9 km	MPC · JPL
234902	2002 TH_{219}	—	October 5, 2002	Socorro	LINEAR	·	3.7 km	MPC · JPL
234903	2002 TV_{228}	—	October 7, 2002	Haleakala	NEAT	ANF	2.3 km	MPC · JPL
234904	2002 TL_{231}	—	October 8, 2002	Palomar	NEAT	EOS	2.6 km	MPC · JPL
234905	2002 TG_{244}	—	October 10, 2002	Palomar	NEAT	·	2.1 km	MPC · JPL
234906	2002 TA_{246}	—	October 9, 2002	Anderson Mesa	LONEOS	EOS	2.7 km	MPC · JPL
234907	2002 TZ_{250}	—	October 7, 2002	Socorro	LINEAR	·	6.0 km	MPC · JPL
234908	2002 TN_{252}	—	October 8, 2002	Anderson Mesa	LONEOS	·	3.0 km	MPC · JPL
234909	2002 TZ_{265}	—	October 10, 2002	Socorro	LINEAR	·	4.2 km	MPC · JPL
234910	2002 TW_{271}	—	October 9, 2002	Socorro	LINEAR	EOS	2.8 km	MPC · JPL
234911	2002 TJ_{276}	—	October 9, 2002	Socorro	LINEAR	·	3.7 km	MPC · JPL
234912	2002 TZ_{277}	—	October 10, 2002	Socorro	LINEAR	EOS	3.1 km	MPC · JPL
234913	2002 TB_{283}	—	October 10, 2002	Socorro	LINEAR	·	4.3 km	MPC · JPL
234914	2002 TZ_{299}	—	October 15, 2002	Palomar	NEAT	·	5.1 km	MPC · JPL
234915	2002 TH_{319}	—	October 5, 2002	Apache Point	SDSS	·	4.0 km	MPC · JPL
234916	2002 TE_{321}	—	October 5, 2002	Apache Point	SDSS	·	2.2 km	MPC · JPL
234917	2002 TK_{324}	—	October 5, 2002	Apache Point	SDSS	·	3.7 km	MPC · JPL
234918	2002 TG_{331}	—	October 5, 2002	Apache Point	SDSS	PAD	3.4 km	MPC · JPL
234919	2002 TJ_{333}	—	October 5, 2002	Apache Point	SDSS	·	2.5 km	MPC · JPL
234920	2002 TK_{350}	—	October 10, 2002	Apache Point	SDSS	·	4.7 km	MPC · JPL
234921	2002 TZ_{353}	—	October 10, 2002	Apache Point	SDSS	·	5.7 km	MPC · JPL
234922	2002 TX_{364}	—	October 10, 2002	Apache Point	SDSS	NAE	4.0 km	MPC · JPL
234923 Bonnell	2002 TR_{382}	Bonnell	October 9, 2002	Palomar	NEAT	·	3.0 km	MPC · JPL
234924	2002 TX_{382}	—	October 15, 2002	Palomar	NEAT	·	4.1 km	MPC · JPL
234925	2002 UK_{2}	—	October 28, 2002	Socorro	LINEAR	T_{j} (2.99)	7.3 km	MPC · JPL
234926	2002 UK_{5}	—	October 28, 2002	Palomar	NEAT	TIR	3.6 km	MPC · JPL
234927	2002 UW_{9}	—	October 26, 2002	Haleakala	NEAT	·	960 m	MPC · JPL
234928	2002 UB_{11}	—	October 28, 2002	Kvistaberg	Uppsala-DLR Asteroid Survey	·	1.4 km	MPC · JPL
234929	2002 UP_{14}	—	October 30, 2002	Palomar	NEAT	·	6.0 km	MPC · JPL
234930	2002 UW_{21}	—	October 30, 2002	Haleakala	NEAT	·	3.9 km	MPC · JPL
234931	2002 UZ_{24}	—	October 30, 2002	Kitt Peak	Spacewatch	·	2.7 km	MPC · JPL
234932	2002 UY_{26}	—	October 31, 2002	Socorro	LINEAR	·	5.1 km	MPC · JPL
234933	2002 UL_{27}	—	October 31, 2002	Palomar	NEAT	EOS	3.8 km	MPC · JPL
234934	2002 UG_{28}	—	October 30, 2002	Palomar	NEAT	·	2.7 km	MPC · JPL
234935	2002 UW_{28}	—	October 31, 2002	Socorro	LINEAR	·	3.4 km	MPC · JPL
234936	2002 UC_{35}	—	October 31, 2002	Socorro	LINEAR	·	5.3 km	MPC · JPL
234937	2002 UW_{69}	—	October 30, 2002	Apache Point	SDSS	TEL	2.3 km	MPC · JPL
234938	2002 VC_{10}	—	November 1, 2002	Palomar	NEAT	EOS	2.8 km	MPC · JPL
234939	2002 VM_{20}	—	November 5, 2002	Kvistaberg	Uppsala-DLR Asteroid Survey	·	5.3 km	MPC · JPL
234940	2002 VT_{28}	—	November 5, 2002	Anderson Mesa	LONEOS	·	4.3 km	MPC · JPL
234941	2002 VO_{29}	—	November 5, 2002	Socorro	LINEAR	·	3.2 km	MPC · JPL
234942	2002 VC_{38}	—	November 5, 2002	Socorro	LINEAR	EOS	3.1 km	MPC · JPL
234943	2002 VT_{38}	—	November 5, 2002	Socorro	LINEAR	TIR ·	5.4 km	MPC · JPL
234944	2002 VB_{42}	—	November 5, 2002	Palomar	NEAT	·	4.3 km	MPC · JPL
234945	2002 VY_{50}	—	November 6, 2002	Anderson Mesa	LONEOS	·	5.5 km	MPC · JPL
234946	2002 VE_{56}	—	November 6, 2002	Anderson Mesa	LONEOS	EOS	3.0 km	MPC · JPL
234947	2002 VV_{66}	—	November 6, 2002	Socorro	LINEAR	·	4.8 km	MPC · JPL
234948	2002 VF_{68}	—	November 4, 2002	La Palma	La Palma	·	2.6 km	MPC · JPL
234949	2002 VL_{68}	—	November 7, 2002	Socorro	LINEAR	·	6.0 km	MPC · JPL
234950	2002 VH_{69}	—	November 8, 2002	Socorro	LINEAR	·	5.1 km	MPC · JPL
234951	2002 VL_{86}	—	November 8, 2002	Socorro	LINEAR	·	4.6 km	MPC · JPL
234952	2002 VQ_{95}	—	November 11, 2002	Anderson Mesa	LONEOS	EMA	4.9 km	MPC · JPL
234953	2002 VB_{97}	—	November 12, 2002	Anderson Mesa	LONEOS	·	4.7 km	MPC · JPL
234954	2002 VL_{124}	—	November 11, 2002	Socorro	LINEAR	EOS	2.6 km	MPC · JPL
234955	2002 VF_{140}	—	November 13, 2002	Palomar	NEAT	·	4.4 km	MPC · JPL
234956	2002 VL_{140}	—	November 13, 2002	Palomar	NEAT	·	2.5 km	MPC · JPL
234957	2002 VK_{147}	—	November 3, 2002	Palomar	NEAT	·	4.7 km	MPC · JPL
234958	2002 WD_{4}	—	November 24, 2002	Palomar	NEAT	·	4.2 km	MPC · JPL
234959	2002 WC_{8}	—	November 24, 2002	Palomar	NEAT	THM	3.6 km	MPC · JPL
234960	2002 WS_{13}	—	November 28, 2002	Campo Imperatore	CINEOS	·	1.2 km	MPC · JPL
234961	2002 WO_{14}	—	November 28, 2002	Anderson Mesa	LONEOS	·	4.0 km	MPC · JPL
234962	2002 WG_{18}	—	November 30, 2002	Socorro	LINEAR	VER	4.1 km	MPC · JPL
234963	2002 WU_{29}	—	November 22, 2002	Palomar	NEAT	·	2.9 km	MPC · JPL
234964	2002 XH_{5}	—	December 4, 2002	Socorro	LINEAR	PHO	1.5 km	MPC · JPL
234965	2002 XQ_{5}	—	December 1, 2002	Socorro	LINEAR	·	4.0 km	MPC · JPL
234966	2002 XM_{7}	—	December 2, 2002	Socorro	LINEAR	·	4.2 km	MPC · JPL
234967	2002 XQ_{15}	—	December 3, 2002	Palomar	NEAT	·	4.3 km	MPC · JPL
234968	2002 XR_{65}	—	December 12, 2002	Socorro	LINEAR	PHO	1.8 km	MPC · JPL
234969	2002 XV_{76}	—	December 11, 2002	Socorro	LINEAR	HYG	4.9 km	MPC · JPL
234970	2002 XG_{89}	—	December 10, 2002	Palomar	NEAT	·	4.8 km	MPC · JPL
234971	2002 XS_{105}	—	December 5, 2002	Anderson Mesa	LONEOS	·	930 m	MPC · JPL
234972	2002 YH_{2}	—	December 27, 2002	Socorro	LINEAR	PHO	1.3 km	MPC · JPL
234973	2002 YA_{5}	—	December 28, 2002	Socorro	LINEAR	·	1.6 km	MPC · JPL
234974	2002 YD_{5}	—	December 28, 2002	Socorro	LINEAR	PHO	3.6 km	MPC · JPL
234975	2002 YG_{14}	—	December 31, 2002	Socorro	LINEAR	·	2.0 km	MPC · JPL
234976	2002 YW_{24}	—	December 31, 2002	Socorro	LINEAR	·	1.2 km	MPC · JPL
234977	2002 YX_{25}	—	December 31, 2002	Socorro	LINEAR	·	920 m	MPC · JPL
234978	2003 AL_{3}	—	January 3, 2003	Socorro	LINEAR	·	4.8 km	MPC · JPL
234979	2003 AR_{14}	—	January 2, 2003	Anderson Mesa	LONEOS	fast	2.6 km	MPC · JPL
234980	2003 AO_{16}	—	January 5, 2003	Socorro	LINEAR	·	6.7 km	MPC · JPL
234981	2003 AB_{33}	—	January 5, 2003	Socorro	LINEAR	·	1.1 km	MPC · JPL
234982	2003 AE_{33}	—	January 5, 2003	Socorro	LINEAR	NYS	2.7 km	MPC · JPL
234983	2003 AJ_{33}	—	January 5, 2003	Socorro	LINEAR	·	1.1 km	MPC · JPL
234984	2003 AM_{52}	—	January 5, 2003	Socorro	LINEAR	CYB	6.6 km	MPC · JPL
234985	2003 AS_{59}	—	January 5, 2003	Socorro	LINEAR	PHO	1.4 km	MPC · JPL
234986	2003 AY_{63}	—	January 7, 2003	Socorro	LINEAR	PHO	1.7 km	MPC · JPL
234987	2003 AJ_{82}	—	January 13, 2003	Socorro	LINEAR	PHO	2.0 km	MPC · JPL
234988	2003 AE_{94}	—	January 5, 2003	Anderson Mesa	LONEOS	·	2.3 km	MPC · JPL
234989	2003 BA_{6}	—	January 23, 2003	Kitt Peak	Spacewatch	·	1.3 km	MPC · JPL
234990	2003 BX_{9}	—	January 26, 2003	Palomar	NEAT	·	1.1 km	MPC · JPL
234991	2003 BW_{15}	—	January 26, 2003	Anderson Mesa	LONEOS	·	1.5 km	MPC · JPL
234992	2003 BE_{17}	—	January 26, 2003	Haleakala	NEAT	PHO	1.6 km	MPC · JPL
234993	2003 BY_{41}	—	January 26, 2003	Palomar	NEAT	·	6.4 km	MPC · JPL
234994	2003 BX_{44}	—	January 27, 2003	Socorro	LINEAR	·	2.7 km	MPC · JPL
234995	2003 BP_{60}	—	January 27, 2003	Palomar	NEAT	·	5.2 km	MPC · JPL
234996	2003 BM_{61}	—	January 27, 2003	Haleakala	NEAT	·	6.5 km	MPC · JPL
234997	2003 BR_{61}	—	January 27, 2003	Haleakala	NEAT	PHO	3.1 km	MPC · JPL
234998	2003 BQ_{67}	—	January 27, 2003	Socorro	LINEAR	·	1.2 km	MPC · JPL
234999	2003 BB_{74}	—	January 29, 2003	Palomar	NEAT	·	910 m	MPC · JPL
235000	2003 BR_{82}	—	January 31, 2003	Socorro	LINEAR	·	1.0 km	MPC · JPL

back to top

== See also ==
- Meanings of minor-planet names: 234001–235000
