= Uruguayan Antarctic Institute =

- Instituto Antártico Uruguayo
- Uruguayan Coat of Arms

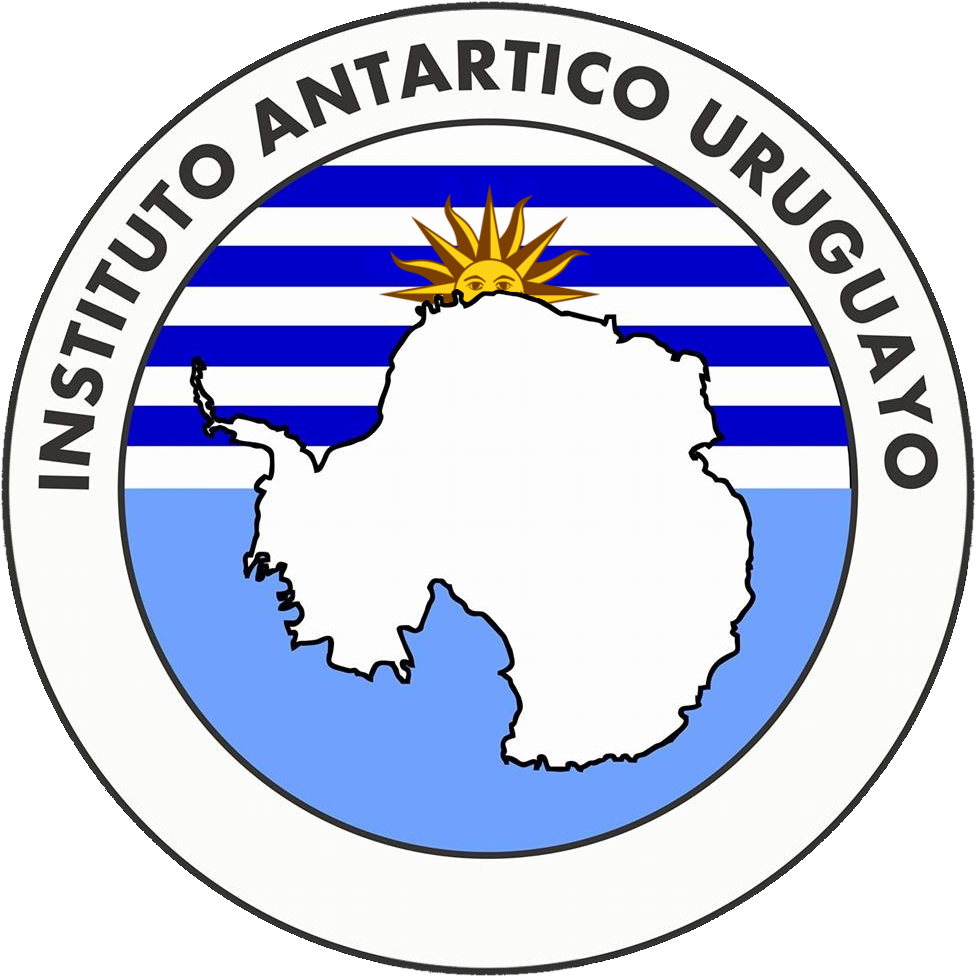
- Logo

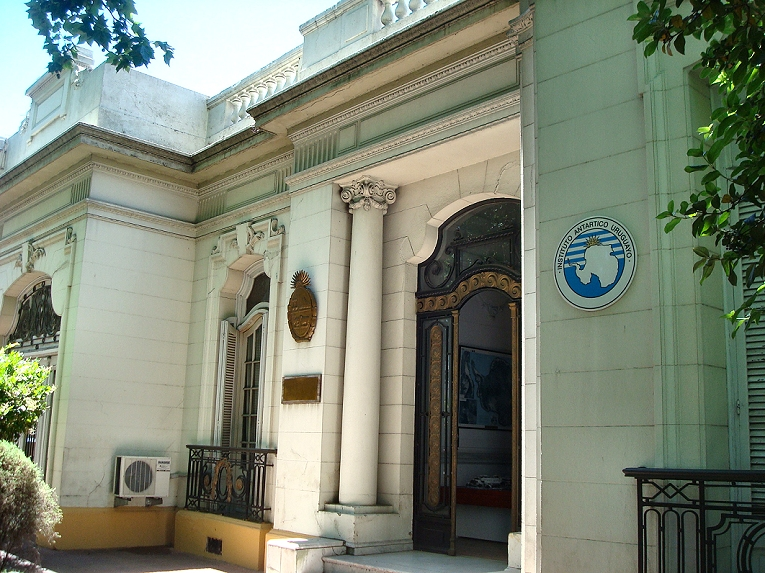
- Headquarters

Agency overview
- Formed: August 25, 1975
- Headquarters: Av. 8 de Octubre 2958 Montevideo, Uruguay
- Agency executive: Daniel Núñez
- Website: http://www.iau.gub.uy/?lang=en

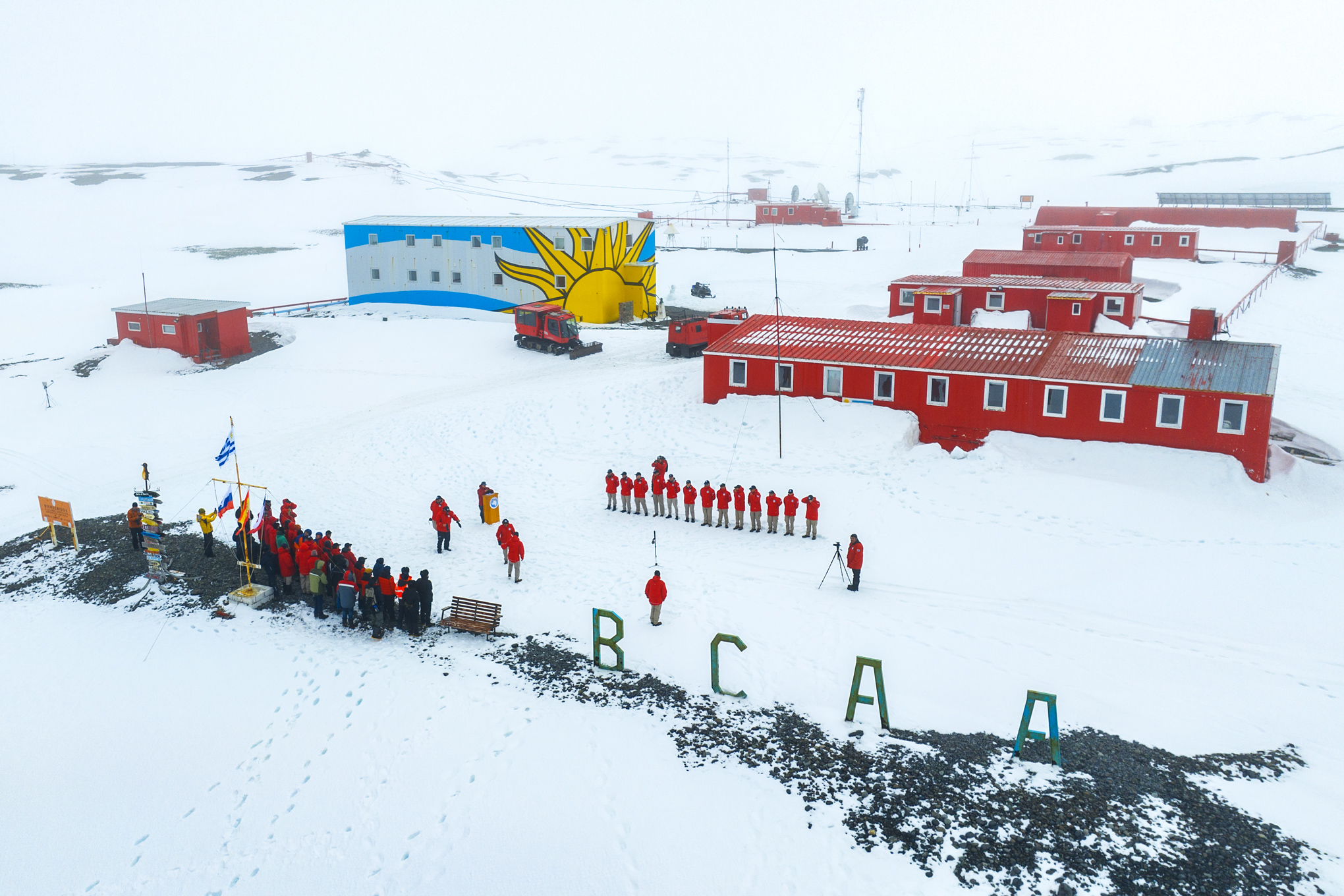
Artigas Base, run by the Uruguayan Antarctic Institute at King George Island

The Uruguayan Antarctic Institute (Spanish: Instituto Antártico Uruguayo) is Uruguay's governmental agency to fund, organize, control and promote research on Antarctica according with the Antarctic Treaty System. It was founded by scientists, and is now managed by Uruguay's Ministries of Defense, Foreign Affairs and Education.

== History ==
Uruguay has been associated with Antarctic activities since 1776, when the country first issued licenses for fishing in the southern seas.

In 1916, it was involved in the attempt of rescue of Sir Ernest Shackleton and the barquentine Endurance crew reaching Elephant Island in August that year, in an expedition by T/N Ruperto Elechiribehety of the Uruguayan Navy. Starting at and continuing after IGY, Navy officers participated in Argentine and British expeditions to Antarctic Peninsula and South Shetland Islands.

The Uruguayan Antarctic Institute itself was founded in Montevideo, Uruguay on January 9, 1968 by Professor Julio César Musso, who was leading a team of Antarctic fellows. Professor Musso became the first UAI President. By August 28, 1975, the Uruguayan Antarctic Institute was integrated under the Ministry of Defense, getting then more resources with the aim to disseminate and carry out scientific investigations in the Antarctic regions under the 60° South Latitude.

In the 1990s the Uruguayan Air Force trained pilots for inland operations on ice by cooperation with Germany. In 1975 the Uruguayan Antarctic Institute was created under MoD, making the nation's Antarctic presence – through an expeditionary program begun in 1984 – a government matter. It has an annual budget specially assigned by the Ministry of Economy and it is ruled by an Interministerial Council, with delegates of Ministry of Defense, Foreign Affairs and Ministry of Education and Culture.

== Structure ==
The Uruguayan Antarctic Institute works in different areas with specialized and experienced personnel in Directions according to the fields and needs. Totalling 58 people, these are:

- Scientific Coordination Direction
- General Secretariat
- Plans & Operations
- Logistics
- Finances and Personnel

The Scientific Coordination Direction organize and evaluates, scientific research programs within the Universities, institutes and research communities to fulfill the needs, requirements and recommendations promoted by Scientific Committee on Antarctic Research (SCAR). It also promotes research programs in SCAR areas of interest with international cooperation and participation with national Institutes and universities.

The Plans & Operations Direction deals with Council of Managers of National Antarctic Programs (COMNAP) affairs in AIROPS, SHIPOPS, TRAINET. Station crews are trained and selected following COMNAP guidelines, and other implemented plans such as Medevac, Oil Spill contingencies, waste management, working together with Logistics, which is also involved in COMNAP – SCALOP for those activities. An important issue is the development of environmental monitoring programs according to the manuals issued by COMNAP. The UAI actively participates in all events of Antarctic community. By national legislation, it ratifies all protocols and agreements caring about science and environment.

== See also ==
- Uruguayan Antarctica, a proposed territory.
