= David Gray =

David or Dave Gray may refer to:

== Arts and entertainment ==
- David Gray (poet) (1838–1861), Scottish poet
- Ugly Dave Gray (born 1933), Australian television personality
- David Gray (Australian musician) (fl. 1974–79), Australian singer-songwriter
- David Gray (director), American commercial director and former creative director
- Dave Gray (broadcaster) (1961-2024), Scottish broadcaster
- David Gray (British musician) (born 1968), British singer-songwriter
- David Gray, drummer for the British blackened death metal band Akercocke
- David Gray, animator on Humf, a British children's television program

== Politicians and civil servants ==
- David Gray (Australian politician) (born 1956), member of the Victorian Legislative Assembly
- David Gray (diplomat) (1870–1968), American novelist, playwright, and diplomat who was minister to Ireland during World War II
- David Gray (police officer) (1914–1999), Scottish police officer
- David Gray (colonial administrator) (1906–1976), British civil servant

== Sportspeople ==
- David Gray (cricketer) (1922–2003), English cricketer
- David Gray (footballer, born 1922) (1922–2008), Scottish footballer (mostly played for Preston NE and Blackburn)
- David Gray (footballer, born 1923) (1923–1985), Scottish footballer (mostly played for Bradford)
- David Gray (footballer, born 1988), Scottish footballer
- David Gray (rugby union) (1953–2009), Scotland international rugby union player
- David Gray (American football) (born 1955), American football player
- David Gray (snooker player) (born 1979), English professional snooker player
- David Gray (sportswriter) (1927–1983), British sports journalist
- Dave Gray (1943–2020), Major League Baseball pitcher
- Davey Gray (born 1954), Irish rower

== Others ==
- David Gray (murderer), perpetrator of the Aramoana massacre
- David Frank Gray (born 1938), Canadian astronomer and stellar spectroscopist
- David Gray (General Hospital), a character in the soap opera General Hospital
- David Gray (academic), university professor and administrator
- David L. Gray (born 1972), American Catholic theologian, author and speaker

== See also ==
- David Grey, American poker player
