= List of minor planets: 235001–236000 =

The following is a partial list of minor planets, running from minor-planet number 235001 through 236000, inclusive. The primary data for this and other partial lists is based on JPL's "Small-Body Orbital Elements" and data available from the Minor Planet Center. Critical list information is also provided by the MPC, unless otherwise specified from Lowell Observatory. A detailed description of the table's columns and additional sources are given on the main page including a complete list of every page in this series, and a statistical break-up on the dynamical classification of minor planets.

Also see the summary list of all named bodies in numerical and alphabetical order, and the corresponding naming citations for the number range of this particular list. New namings may only be added to this list after official publication, as the preannouncement of names is condemned by the Working Group for Small Bodies Nomenclature of the International Astronomical Union.

Near-Earth obj.	MBA (inner)	MBA (outer)	Centaur
Mars-crosser	MBA (middle)	Jupiter trojan	Trans-Neptunian obj.
Unclassified

== 235001–235100 ==
Designation			Discovery			Properties		Ref
Permanent	Provisional	Named after	Date	Site	Discoverer(s)	Category	Diam.	Ref
235001	2003 BT_{83}	—	January 31, 2003	Socorro	LINEAR	·	1.2 km	MPC · JPL
235002	2003 BK_{87}	—	January 26, 2003	Anderson Mesa	LONEOS	·	1.1 km	MPC · JPL
235003	2003 CL_{7}	—	February 1, 2003	Socorro	LINEAR	·	6.5 km	MPC · JPL
235004	2003 CJ_{12}	—	February 2, 2003	Palomar	NEAT	·	1.7 km	MPC · JPL
235005	2003 CW_{17}	—	February 7, 2003	Palomar	NEAT	·	1.2 km	MPC · JPL
235006	2003 CX_{25}	—	February 12, 2003	Haleakala	NEAT	·	980 m	MPC · JPL
235007	2003 DD_{8}	—	February 22, 2003	Palomar	NEAT	·	1.2 km	MPC · JPL
235008	2003 DQ_{9}	—	February 25, 2003	Campo Imperatore	CINEOS	·	1 km	MPC · JPL
235009	2003 DB_{12}	—	February 25, 2003	Campo Imperatore	CINEOS	·	1.7 km	MPC · JPL
235010	2003 DV_{13}	—	February 25, 2003	Haleakala	NEAT	·	1.2 km	MPC · JPL
235011	2003 DR_{21}	—	February 23, 2003	Anderson Mesa	LONEOS	·	1.5 km	MPC · JPL
235012	2003 EZ_{2}	—	March 6, 2003	Socorro	LINEAR	ERI	2.5 km	MPC · JPL
235013	2003 EM_{4}	—	March 6, 2003	Desert Eagle	W. K. Y. Yeung	·	1.7 km	MPC · JPL
235014	2003 ES_{4}	—	March 4, 2003	St. Véran	St. Veran	·	1.2 km	MPC · JPL
235015	2003 EC_{11}	—	March 6, 2003	Socorro	LINEAR	·	1.5 km	MPC · JPL
235016	2003 EC_{18}	—	March 6, 2003	Anderson Mesa	LONEOS	·	1.6 km	MPC · JPL
235017	2003 EY_{19}	—	March 6, 2003	Anderson Mesa	LONEOS	·	870 m	MPC · JPL
235018	2003 EE_{26}	—	March 6, 2003	Socorro	LINEAR	·	1.1 km	MPC · JPL
235019	2003 EF_{26}	—	March 6, 2003	Socorro	LINEAR	·	970 m	MPC · JPL
235020	2003 EF_{31}	—	March 6, 2003	Palomar	NEAT	·	1.0 km	MPC · JPL
235021	2003 EM_{32}	—	March 7, 2003	Anderson Mesa	LONEOS	·	1.3 km	MPC · JPL
235022	2003 EM_{44}	—	March 7, 2003	Socorro	LINEAR	·	1.2 km	MPC · JPL
235023	2003 EG_{49}	—	March 10, 2003	Anderson Mesa	LONEOS	·	820 m	MPC · JPL
235024	2003 EM_{49}	—	March 10, 2003	Anderson Mesa	LONEOS	·	1.3 km	MPC · JPL
235025	2003 EJ_{57}	—	March 9, 2003	Anderson Mesa	LONEOS	PHO	1.9 km	MPC · JPL
235026	2003 FC_{2}	—	March 23, 2003	Drebach	Drebach	·	1.1 km	MPC · JPL
235027 Pommard	2003 FH_{2}	Pommard	March 23, 2003	Vicques	M. Ory	·	900 m	MPC · JPL
235028	2003 FA_{6}	—	March 26, 2003	Campo Imperatore	CINEOS	·	1.8 km	MPC · JPL
235029	2003 FC_{6}	—	March 26, 2003	Campo Imperatore	CINEOS	·	1.1 km	MPC · JPL
235030	2003 FO_{6}	—	March 26, 2003	Kleť	M. Tichý, Kočer, M.	V	910 m	MPC · JPL
235031	2003 FW_{11}	—	March 23, 2003	Kitt Peak	Spacewatch	V	1.0 km	MPC · JPL
235032	2003 FH_{14}	—	March 23, 2003	Kitt Peak	Spacewatch	·	1.1 km	MPC · JPL
235033	2003 FT_{15}	—	March 23, 2003	Kitt Peak	Spacewatch	·	1.7 km	MPC · JPL
235034	2003 FX_{17}	—	March 24, 2003	Kitt Peak	Spacewatch	·	1.1 km	MPC · JPL
235035	2003 FU_{19}	—	March 30, 2003	Socorro	LINEAR	·	1.2 km	MPC · JPL
235036	2003 FH_{28}	—	March 24, 2003	Haleakala	NEAT	·	1.7 km	MPC · JPL
235037	2003 FD_{36}	—	March 23, 2003	Kitt Peak	Spacewatch	·	1.8 km	MPC · JPL
235038	2003 FS_{36}	—	March 23, 2003	Kitt Peak	Spacewatch	·	1.2 km	MPC · JPL
235039	2003 FN_{40}	—	March 25, 2003	Palomar	NEAT	·	1.6 km	MPC · JPL
235040	2003 FV_{47}	—	March 24, 2003	Kitt Peak	Spacewatch	·	1.8 km	MPC · JPL
235041	2003 FA_{55}	—	March 25, 2003	Haleakala	NEAT	·	2.0 km	MPC · JPL
235042	2003 FS_{56}	—	March 26, 2003	Palomar	NEAT	·	1.6 km	MPC · JPL
235043	2003 FH_{57}	—	March 26, 2003	Palomar	NEAT	·	1.1 km	MPC · JPL
235044	2003 FK_{59}	—	March 26, 2003	Palomar	NEAT	PHO	1.6 km	MPC · JPL
235045	2003 FU_{62}	—	March 26, 2003	Palomar	NEAT	·	1.6 km	MPC · JPL
235046	2003 FG_{67}	—	March 26, 2003	Palomar	NEAT	·	1.2 km	MPC · JPL
235047	2003 FS_{67}	—	March 26, 2003	Palomar	NEAT	NYS	1.4 km	MPC · JPL
235048	2003 FF_{69}	—	March 26, 2003	Palomar	NEAT	·	1.3 km	MPC · JPL
235049	2003 FU_{69}	—	March 26, 2003	Palomar	NEAT	NYS	2.7 km	MPC · JPL
235050	2003 FA_{70}	—	March 26, 2003	Kitt Peak	Spacewatch	·	1.3 km	MPC · JPL
235051	2003 FW_{70}	—	March 26, 2003	Kitt Peak	Spacewatch	·	1.5 km	MPC · JPL
235052	2003 FJ_{72}	—	March 26, 2003	Palomar	NEAT	·	1.8 km	MPC · JPL
235053	2003 FM_{72}	—	March 26, 2003	Palomar	NEAT	·	2.3 km	MPC · JPL
235054	2003 FV_{74}	—	March 26, 2003	Palomar	NEAT	·	1.7 km	MPC · JPL
235055	2003 FF_{75}	—	March 26, 2003	Campo Imperatore	CINEOS	·	1.3 km	MPC · JPL
235056	2003 FU_{75}	—	March 27, 2003	Palomar	NEAT	·	1.5 km	MPC · JPL
235057	2003 FU_{77}	—	March 27, 2003	Palomar	NEAT	(2076)	1.9 km	MPC · JPL
235058	2003 FX_{98}	—	March 30, 2003	Socorro	LINEAR	·	3.0 km	MPC · JPL
235059	2003 FF_{99}	—	March 30, 2003	Socorro	LINEAR	MAS	1 km	MPC · JPL
235060	2003 FL_{101}	—	March 31, 2003	Socorro	LINEAR	·	1.3 km	MPC · JPL
235061	2003 FL_{104}	—	March 25, 2003	Haleakala	NEAT	·	1.5 km	MPC · JPL
235062	2003 FX_{108}	—	March 31, 2003	Socorro	LINEAR	·	1.9 km	MPC · JPL
235063	2003 FR_{116}	—	March 23, 2003	Kitt Peak	Spacewatch	·	1.6 km	MPC · JPL
235064	2003 FJ_{118}	—	March 25, 2003	Haleakala	NEAT	(2076)	1.4 km	MPC · JPL
235065	2003 FX_{118}	—	March 26, 2003	Anderson Mesa	LONEOS	·	1.1 km	MPC · JPL
235066	2003 FU_{130}	—	March 29, 2003	Anderson Mesa	LONEOS	·	1.5 km	MPC · JPL
235067	2003 FN_{131}	—	March 27, 2003	Palomar	NEAT	·	2.4 km	MPC · JPL
235068	2003 GF_{1}	—	April 1, 2003	Socorro	LINEAR	·	1.3 km	MPC · JPL
235069	2003 GF_{12}	—	April 1, 2003	Socorro	LINEAR	·	1.1 km	MPC · JPL
235070	2003 GU_{13}	—	April 4, 2003	Kitt Peak	Spacewatch	NYS	1.3 km	MPC · JPL
235071	2003 GK_{14}	—	April 1, 2003	Socorro	LINEAR	·	1.5 km	MPC · JPL
235072	2003 GJ_{16}	—	April 2, 2003	Haleakala	NEAT	·	1.4 km	MPC · JPL
235073	2003 GS_{23}	—	April 5, 2003	Kitt Peak	Spacewatch	·	1.4 km	MPC · JPL
235074	2003 GU_{28}	—	April 8, 2003	Haleakala	NEAT	·	2.4 km	MPC · JPL
235075	2003 GF_{29}	—	April 5, 2003	Haleakala	NEAT	·	1.8 km	MPC · JPL
235076	2003 GJ_{32}	—	April 8, 2003	Socorro	LINEAR	NYS	2.7 km	MPC · JPL
235077	2003 GG_{35}	—	April 4, 2003	Kitt Peak	Spacewatch	·	1.8 km	MPC · JPL
235078	2003 GG_{47}	—	April 7, 2003	Kitt Peak	Spacewatch	·	1.4 km	MPC · JPL
235079	2003 GT_{50}	—	April 8, 2003	Haleakala	NEAT	·	1.6 km	MPC · JPL
235080	2003 GS_{51}	—	April 1, 2003	Kitt Peak	M. W. Buie	·	1.6 km	MPC · JPL
235081	2003 GJ_{52}	—	April 1, 2003	Kitt Peak	M. W. Buie	·	1.7 km	MPC · JPL
235082	2003 GC_{56}	—	April 9, 2003	Kitt Peak	Spacewatch	·	1.5 km	MPC · JPL
235083	2003 HM_{3}	—	April 24, 2003	Anderson Mesa	LONEOS	·	1.5 km	MPC · JPL
235084	2003 HL_{5}	—	April 24, 2003	Kitt Peak	Spacewatch	·	1.7 km	MPC · JPL
235085	2003 HM_{11}	—	April 23, 2003	Campo Imperatore	CINEOS	·	1.9 km	MPC · JPL
235086	2003 HW_{11}	—	April 25, 2003	Anderson Mesa	LONEOS	AMO +1km	1.0 km	MPC · JPL
235087	2003 HX_{13}	—	April 25, 2003	Campo Imperatore	CINEOS	V	850 m	MPC · JPL
235088	2003 HD_{22}	—	April 27, 2003	Anderson Mesa	LONEOS	·	3.2 km	MPC · JPL
235089	2003 HG_{29}	—	April 28, 2003	Kitt Peak	Spacewatch	·	1.3 km	MPC · JPL
235090	2003 HG_{39}	—	April 29, 2003	Socorro	LINEAR	·	2.6 km	MPC · JPL
235091	2003 HC_{46}	—	April 28, 2003	Kitt Peak	Spacewatch	·	1.3 km	MPC · JPL
235092	2003 HA_{58}	—	April 25, 2003	Anderson Mesa	LONEOS	·	2.4 km	MPC · JPL
235093	2003 JA_{7}	—	May 1, 2003	Socorro	LINEAR	·	1.9 km	MPC · JPL
235094	2003 JU_{7}	—	May 2, 2003	Socorro	LINEAR	V	930 m	MPC · JPL
235095	2003 JB_{8}	—	May 2, 2003	Socorro	LINEAR	·	1.6 km	MPC · JPL
235096	2003 JT_{11}	—	May 2, 2003	Socorro	LINEAR	·	1.5 km	MPC · JPL
235097	2003 KO_{5}	—	May 22, 2003	Kitt Peak	Spacewatch	(5)	1.9 km	MPC · JPL
235098	2003 KM_{7}	—	May 24, 2003	Kitt Peak	Spacewatch	·	2.0 km	MPC · JPL
235099	2003 KH_{18}	—	May 29, 2003	Socorro	LINEAR	MAS	1.1 km	MPC · JPL
235100	2003 KH_{35}	—	May 30, 2003	Cerro Tololo	M. W. Buie	·	1.6 km	MPC · JPL

== 235101–235200 ==
back to top

Designation			Discovery			Properties		Ref
Permanent	Provisional	Named after	Date	Site	Discoverer(s)	Category	Diam.	Ref
235101	2003 LK_{3}	—	June 4, 2003	Kitt Peak	Spacewatch	MAS	900 m	MPC · JPL
235102	2003 LO_{9}	—	June 1, 2003	Kitt Peak	Spacewatch	·	2.7 km	MPC · JPL
235103	2003 MQ_{1}	—	June 23, 2003	Socorro	LINEAR	PHO	1.4 km	MPC · JPL
235104	2003 MH_{8}	—	June 28, 2003	Socorro	LINEAR	·	3.0 km	MPC · JPL
235105	2003 NW_{4}	—	July 4, 2003	Reedy Creek	J. Broughton	·	2.2 km	MPC · JPL
235106	2003 ON_{5}	—	July 22, 2003	Haleakala	NEAT	·	1.2 km	MPC · JPL
235107	2003 OF_{14}	—	July 21, 2003	Palomar	NEAT	PHO	1.5 km	MPC · JPL
235108	2003 OO_{19}	—	July 30, 2003	Haleakala	NEAT	·	3.4 km	MPC · JPL
235109	2003 OB_{24}	—	July 24, 2003	Palomar	NEAT	·	4.7 km	MPC · JPL
235110	2003 OG_{26}	—	July 24, 2003	Palomar	NEAT	(5)	1.7 km	MPC · JPL
235111	2003 OS_{27}	—	July 24, 2003	Palomar	NEAT	EUN	2.1 km	MPC · JPL
235112	2003 OJ_{29}	—	July 24, 2003	Palomar	NEAT	MAR	1.6 km	MPC · JPL
235113	2003 PX	—	August 1, 2003	Socorro	LINEAR	·	2.5 km	MPC · JPL
235114	2003 PV_{1}	—	August 1, 2003	Haleakala	NEAT	·	2.7 km	MPC · JPL
235115	2003 PW_{4}	—	August 3, 2003	Haleakala	NEAT	·	2.8 km	MPC · JPL
235116	2003 PH_{7}	—	August 1, 2003	Haleakala	NEAT	·	2.1 km	MPC · JPL
235117	2003 QL_{6}	—	August 18, 2003	Campo Imperatore	CINEOS	·	2.5 km	MPC · JPL
235118	2003 QU_{7}	—	August 21, 2003	Palomar	NEAT	DOR	3.0 km	MPC · JPL
235119	2003 QF_{11}	—	August 20, 2003	Campo Imperatore	CINEOS	GEF	1.9 km	MPC · JPL
235120	2003 QQ_{12}	—	August 22, 2003	Haleakala	NEAT	·	2.8 km	MPC · JPL
235121	2003 QK_{21}	—	August 22, 2003	Palomar	NEAT	·	3.2 km	MPC · JPL
235122	2003 QJ_{26}	—	August 22, 2003	Haleakala	NEAT	·	2.6 km	MPC · JPL
235123	2003 QY_{26}	—	August 22, 2003	Haleakala	NEAT	TIR	3.2 km	MPC · JPL
235124	2003 QS_{33}	—	August 22, 2003	Palomar	NEAT	·	1.7 km	MPC · JPL
235125	2003 QU_{38}	—	August 22, 2003	Palomar	NEAT	·	1.9 km	MPC · JPL
235126	2003 QB_{42}	—	August 22, 2003	Socorro	LINEAR	·	2.9 km	MPC · JPL
235127	2003 QV_{42}	—	August 22, 2003	Palomar	NEAT	·	2.9 km	MPC · JPL
235128	2003 QL_{45}	—	August 23, 2003	Palomar	NEAT	·	1.7 km	MPC · JPL
235129	2003 QJ_{47}	—	August 23, 2003	Socorro	LINEAR	H	830 m	MPC · JPL
235130	2003 QY_{53}	—	August 23, 2003	Socorro	LINEAR	·	1.5 km	MPC · JPL
235131	2003 QL_{57}	—	August 23, 2003	Socorro	LINEAR	·	3.6 km	MPC · JPL
235132	2003 QP_{57}	—	August 23, 2003	Palomar	NEAT	·	2.4 km	MPC · JPL
235133	2003 QN_{59}	—	August 23, 2003	Socorro	LINEAR	·	2.7 km	MPC · JPL
235134	2003 QR_{60}	—	August 23, 2003	Socorro	LINEAR	·	2.3 km	MPC · JPL
235135	2003 QF_{63}	—	August 23, 2003	Socorro	LINEAR	·	3.0 km	MPC · JPL
235136	2003 QJ_{63}	—	August 23, 2003	Socorro	LINEAR	·	4.0 km	MPC · JPL
235137	2003 QK_{63}	—	August 23, 2003	Socorro	LINEAR	·	2.1 km	MPC · JPL
235138	2003 QP_{68}	—	August 25, 2003	Socorro	LINEAR	JUN	1.7 km	MPC · JPL
235139	2003 QC_{69}	—	August 26, 2003	Reedy Creek	J. Broughton	·	3.8 km	MPC · JPL
235140	2003 QB_{71}	—	August 23, 2003	Palomar	NEAT	·	3.8 km	MPC · JPL
235141	2003 QC_{74}	—	August 24, 2003	Socorro	LINEAR	·	2.6 km	MPC · JPL
235142	2003 QR_{77}	—	August 24, 2003	Socorro	LINEAR	·	4.3 km	MPC · JPL
235143	2003 QY_{77}	—	August 24, 2003	Socorro	LINEAR	·	5.6 km	MPC · JPL
235144	2003 QQ_{81}	—	August 23, 2003	Socorro	LINEAR	EUN	1.6 km	MPC · JPL
235145 Ericquirico	2003 QL_{88}	Ericquirico	August 25, 2003	Cerro Tololo	M. W. Buie	(5)	1.3 km	MPC · JPL
235146	2003 QE_{96}	—	August 30, 2003	Haleakala	NEAT	EUN · fast	1.7 km	MPC · JPL
235147	2003 QP_{101}	—	August 29, 2003	Haleakala	NEAT	EUN	1.9 km	MPC · JPL
235148	2003 QA_{103}	—	August 31, 2003	Kitt Peak	Spacewatch	·	1.4 km	MPC · JPL
235149	2003 QS_{104}	—	August 29, 2003	Socorro	LINEAR	·	2.8 km	MPC · JPL
235150	2003 QT_{114}	—	August 31, 2003	Haleakala	NEAT	GAL	2.5 km	MPC · JPL
235151	2003 RD	—	September 2, 2003	Socorro	LINEAR	H	840 m	MPC · JPL
235152	2003 RE_{1}	—	September 2, 2003	Socorro	LINEAR	·	4.3 km	MPC · JPL
235153	2003 RP_{1}	—	September 2, 2003	Reedy Creek	J. Broughton	ADE	3.8 km	MPC · JPL
235154	2003 RM_{5}	—	September 4, 2003	Kitt Peak	Spacewatch	·	3.0 km	MPC · JPL
235155	2003 RL_{6}	—	September 1, 2003	Socorro	LINEAR	·	1.9 km	MPC · JPL
235156	2003 RR_{9}	—	September 4, 2003	Socorro	LINEAR	EOS	5.5 km	MPC · JPL
235157	2003 RH_{23}	—	September 13, 2003	Haleakala	NEAT	·	2.2 km	MPC · JPL
235158	2003 SL_{1}	—	September 16, 2003	Kitt Peak	Spacewatch	·	2.8 km	MPC · JPL
235159	2003 SG_{3}	—	September 16, 2003	Palomar	NEAT	·	2.7 km	MPC · JPL
235160	2003 SQ_{4}	—	September 16, 2003	Palomar	NEAT	EUN	1.4 km	MPC · JPL
235161	2003 SC_{6}	—	September 16, 2003	Kitt Peak	Spacewatch	·	4.4 km	MPC · JPL
235162	2003 ST_{7}	—	September 16, 2003	Palomar	NEAT	·	4.3 km	MPC · JPL
235163	2003 SK_{8}	—	September 16, 2003	Kitt Peak	Spacewatch	·	1.7 km	MPC · JPL
235164	2003 SG_{11}	—	September 17, 2003	Socorro	LINEAR	H	1.1 km	MPC · JPL
235165	2003 SO_{24}	—	September 17, 2003	Socorro	LINEAR	·	4.1 km	MPC · JPL
235166	2003 SG_{31}	—	September 18, 2003	Kitt Peak	Spacewatch	NEM	3.0 km	MPC · JPL
235167	2003 SC_{36}	—	September 18, 2003	Socorro	LINEAR	·	3.2 km	MPC · JPL
235168	2003 SF_{43}	—	September 16, 2003	Anderson Mesa	LONEOS	EUN	1.5 km	MPC · JPL
235169	2003 SW_{43}	—	September 16, 2003	Anderson Mesa	LONEOS	·	4.1 km	MPC · JPL
235170	2003 SM_{46}	—	September 16, 2003	Anderson Mesa	LONEOS	MRX	1.7 km	MPC · JPL
235171	2003 SH_{47}	—	September 16, 2003	Anderson Mesa	LONEOS	·	4.4 km	MPC · JPL
235172	2003 SV_{51}	—	September 18, 2003	Palomar	NEAT	·	3.3 km	MPC · JPL
235173	2003 SW_{60}	—	September 17, 2003	Kitt Peak	Spacewatch	·	2.6 km	MPC · JPL
235174	2003 SM_{61}	—	September 17, 2003	Socorro	LINEAR	MRX	1.5 km	MPC · JPL
235175	2003 SG_{62}	—	September 17, 2003	Socorro	LINEAR	·	2.8 km	MPC · JPL
235176	2003 SP_{64}	—	September 18, 2003	Campo Imperatore	CINEOS	(5)	1.4 km	MPC · JPL
235177	2003 SY_{65}	—	September 18, 2003	Socorro	LINEAR	·	3.0 km	MPC · JPL
235178	2003 SN_{66}	—	September 18, 2003	Campo Imperatore	CINEOS	·	4.1 km	MPC · JPL
235179	2003 SH_{68}	—	September 17, 2003	Kitt Peak	Spacewatch	·	3.8 km	MPC · JPL
235180	2003 SD_{71}	—	September 18, 2003	Kitt Peak	Spacewatch	·	2.0 km	MPC · JPL
235181	2003 SW_{77}	—	September 19, 2003	Kitt Peak	Spacewatch	·	2.6 km	MPC · JPL
235182	2003 SV_{82}	—	September 18, 2003	Kitt Peak	Spacewatch	GEF	1.5 km	MPC · JPL
235183	2003 SW_{92}	—	September 18, 2003	Kitt Peak	Spacewatch	·	1.7 km	MPC · JPL
235184	2003 SL_{93}	—	September 18, 2003	Kitt Peak	Spacewatch	·	4.1 km	MPC · JPL
235185	2003 SE_{94}	—	September 18, 2003	Palomar	NEAT	·	2.9 km	MPC · JPL
235186	2003 SN_{99}	—	September 19, 2003	Haleakala	NEAT	·	4.4 km	MPC · JPL
235187	2003 SM_{100}	—	September 20, 2003	Kitt Peak	Spacewatch	·	2.2 km	MPC · JPL
235188	2003 SF_{106}	—	September 20, 2003	Palomar	NEAT	·	2.1 km	MPC · JPL
235189	2003 SW_{107}	—	September 20, 2003	Palomar	NEAT	·	2.0 km	MPC · JPL
235190	2003 SF_{108}	—	September 20, 2003	Palomar	NEAT	slow	5.5 km	MPC · JPL
235191	2003 SG_{129}	—	September 20, 2003	Črni Vrh	Skvarč, J.	·	2.5 km	MPC · JPL
235192	2003 SK_{129}	—	September 20, 2003	Essen	Essen	·	2.7 km	MPC · JPL
235193	2003 SE_{134}	—	September 18, 2003	Palomar	NEAT	·	1.8 km	MPC · JPL
235194	2003 SR_{134}	—	September 18, 2003	Kitt Peak	Spacewatch	AGN	1.7 km	MPC · JPL
235195	2003 SC_{138}	—	September 21, 2003	Črni Vrh	Skvarč, J.	HNS	1.9 km	MPC · JPL
235196	2003 SR_{138}	—	September 20, 2003	Palomar	NEAT	·	3.6 km	MPC · JPL
235197	2003 SF_{146}	—	September 20, 2003	Haleakala	NEAT	·	3.4 km	MPC · JPL
235198	2003 SL_{148}	—	September 16, 2003	Socorro	LINEAR	·	3.8 km	MPC · JPL
235199	2003 SQ_{148}	—	September 16, 2003	Kitt Peak	Spacewatch	·	2.1 km	MPC · JPL
235200	2003 SP_{154}	—	September 19, 2003	Anderson Mesa	LONEOS	·	3.3 km	MPC · JPL

== 235201–235300 ==
back to top

Designation			Discovery			Properties		Ref
Permanent	Provisional	Named after	Date	Site	Discoverer(s)	Category	Diam.	Ref
235201 Lorántffy	2003 SG_{158}	Lorántffy	September 23, 2003	Piszkéstető	K. Sárneczky, B. Sipőcz	T_{j} (2.97)	4.6 km	MPC · JPL
235202	2003 SP_{158}	—	September 23, 2003	Haleakala	NEAT	(194)	1.7 km	MPC · JPL
235203	2003 SE_{164}	—	September 20, 2003	Anderson Mesa	LONEOS	HOF	3.8 km	MPC · JPL
235204	2003 SH_{167}	—	September 22, 2003	Socorro	LINEAR	·	3.1 km	MPC · JPL
235205	2003 SQ_{167}	—	September 22, 2003	Kitt Peak	Spacewatch	·	3.6 km	MPC · JPL
235206	2003 SV_{174}	—	September 18, 2003	Kitt Peak	Spacewatch	AGN	1.5 km	MPC · JPL
235207	2003 SW_{175}	—	September 18, 2003	Kitt Peak	Spacewatch	·	2.4 km	MPC · JPL
235208	2003 SS_{183}	—	September 21, 2003	Socorro	LINEAR	·	3.6 km	MPC · JPL
235209	2003 SK_{186}	—	September 22, 2003	Anderson Mesa	LONEOS	(5)	1.5 km	MPC · JPL
235210	2003 SB_{189}	—	September 22, 2003	Anderson Mesa	LONEOS	·	2.5 km	MPC · JPL
235211	2003 SP_{189}	—	September 22, 2003	Kitt Peak	Spacewatch	·	3.7 km	MPC · JPL
235212	2003 SZ_{192}	—	September 20, 2003	Palomar	NEAT	·	3.9 km	MPC · JPL
235213	2003 ST_{201}	—	September 26, 2003	Desert Eagle	W. K. Y. Yeung	·	3.7 km	MPC · JPL
235214	2003 SX_{208}	—	September 23, 2003	Haleakala	NEAT	·	4.0 km	MPC · JPL
235215	2003 SL_{217}	—	September 27, 2003	Kitt Peak	Spacewatch	·	2.5 km	MPC · JPL
235216	2003 SR_{217}	—	September 27, 2003	Sierra Nevada	Sierra Nevada	·	1.9 km	MPC · JPL
235217	2003 SZ_{223}	—	September 30, 2003	Drebach	Payer, T.	·	3.1 km	MPC · JPL
235218	2003 SX_{230}	—	September 24, 2003	Palomar	NEAT	·	2.6 km	MPC · JPL
235219	2003 SU_{231}	—	September 24, 2003	Palomar	NEAT	·	2.7 km	MPC · JPL
235220	2003 SE_{232}	—	September 24, 2003	Haleakala	NEAT	·	2.6 km	MPC · JPL
235221	2003 SZ_{236}	—	September 26, 2003	Socorro	LINEAR	·	2.3 km	MPC · JPL
235222	2003 SU_{237}	—	September 26, 2003	Socorro	LINEAR	·	2.6 km	MPC · JPL
235223	2003 SA_{238}	—	September 26, 2003	Desert Eagle	W. K. Y. Yeung	·	2.0 km	MPC · JPL
235224	2003 SM_{238}	—	September 27, 2003	Socorro	LINEAR	HOF	4.7 km	MPC · JPL
235225	2003 SZ_{244}	—	September 26, 2003	Socorro	LINEAR	AGN	1.5 km	MPC · JPL
235226	2003 SE_{246}	—	September 26, 2003	Socorro	LINEAR	·	2.4 km	MPC · JPL
235227	2003 SX_{247}	—	September 26, 2003	Socorro	LINEAR	·	1.8 km	MPC · JPL
235228	2003 SK_{251}	—	September 26, 2003	Socorro	LINEAR	H	950 m	MPC · JPL
235229	2003 SY_{252}	—	September 27, 2003	Anderson Mesa	LONEOS	·	2.5 km	MPC · JPL
235230	2003 SF_{255}	—	September 27, 2003	Kitt Peak	Spacewatch	·	2.0 km	MPC · JPL
235231	2003 SU_{256}	—	September 28, 2003	Kitt Peak	Spacewatch	·	2.9 km	MPC · JPL
235232	2003 SL_{258}	—	September 28, 2003	Kitt Peak	Spacewatch	·	3.7 km	MPC · JPL
235233	2003 SZ_{258}	—	September 28, 2003	Kitt Peak	Spacewatch	·	3.9 km	MPC · JPL
235234	2003 SV_{260}	—	September 27, 2003	Socorro	LINEAR	·	2.8 km	MPC · JPL
235235	2003 SB_{263}	—	September 28, 2003	Socorro	LINEAR	·	3.1 km	MPC · JPL
235236	2003 SS_{267}	—	September 29, 2003	Kitt Peak	Spacewatch	·	2.0 km	MPC · JPL
235237	2003 SE_{276}	—	September 29, 2003	Kitt Peak	Spacewatch	·	1.8 km	MPC · JPL
235238	2003 SF_{280}	—	September 18, 2003	Socorro	LINEAR	·	2.9 km	MPC · JPL
235239	2003 SO_{290}	—	September 28, 2003	Kitt Peak	Spacewatch	WIT	1.3 km	MPC · JPL
235240	2003 ST_{290}	—	September 28, 2003	Kitt Peak	Spacewatch	KOR	1.7 km	MPC · JPL
235241	2003 SA_{301}	—	September 17, 2003	Palomar	NEAT	WIT	1.3 km	MPC · JPL
235242	2003 SL_{302}	—	September 17, 2003	Palomar	NEAT	·	3.4 km	MPC · JPL
235243	2003 SS_{302}	—	September 17, 2003	Palomar	NEAT	AGN	1.6 km	MPC · JPL
235244	2003 ST_{308}	—	September 29, 2003	Socorro	LINEAR	·	3.9 km	MPC · JPL
235245	2003 ST_{310}	—	September 29, 2003	Socorro	LINEAR	EUN	1.6 km	MPC · JPL
235246	2003 SD_{317}	—	September 16, 2003	Kitt Peak	Spacewatch	PAD	2.3 km	MPC · JPL
235247	2003 SG_{319}	—	September 21, 2003	Anderson Mesa	LONEOS	·	2.1 km	MPC · JPL
235248	2003 SV_{319}	—	September 28, 2003	Anderson Mesa	LONEOS	·	1.7 km	MPC · JPL
235249	2003 SF_{320}	—	September 17, 2003	Socorro	LINEAR	·	2.4 km	MPC · JPL
235250	2003 SR_{320}	—	September 18, 2003	Kitt Peak	Spacewatch	·	3.3 km	MPC · JPL
235251	2003 SU_{320}	—	September 18, 2003	Kitt Peak	Spacewatch	·	2.7 km	MPC · JPL
235252	2003 SN_{321}	—	September 21, 2003	Anderson Mesa	LONEOS	GEF	1.6 km	MPC · JPL
235253	2003 SU_{321}	—	September 22, 2003	Palomar	NEAT	·	2.7 km	MPC · JPL
235254	2003 SH_{322}	—	September 28, 2003	Socorro	LINEAR	·	3.8 km	MPC · JPL
235255	2003 SR_{323}	—	September 16, 2003	Kitt Peak	Spacewatch	·	2.8 km	MPC · JPL
235256	2003 SS_{353}	—	September 21, 2003	Palomar	NEAT	·	3.2 km	MPC · JPL
235257	2003 SR_{354}	—	September 22, 2003	Anderson Mesa	LONEOS	·	2.6 km	MPC · JPL
235258	2003 ST_{378}	—	September 26, 2003	Apache Point	SDSS	·	2.0 km	MPC · JPL
235259	2003 SV_{414}	—	September 28, 2003	Apache Point	SDSS	HOF	2.6 km	MPC · JPL
235260	2003 SE_{415}	—	September 28, 2003	Apache Point	SDSS	·	2.0 km	MPC · JPL
235261	2003 SU_{420}	—	September 29, 2003	Apache Point	SDSS	·	2.3 km	MPC · JPL
235262	2003 SB_{428}	—	September 16, 2003	Kitt Peak	Spacewatch	·	1.8 km	MPC · JPL
235263	2003 SN_{428}	—	September 18, 2003	Kitt Peak	Spacewatch	·	3.4 km	MPC · JPL
235264	2003 TD_{4}	—	October 2, 2003	Kitt Peak	Spacewatch	·	2.5 km	MPC · JPL
235265	2003 TY_{8}	—	October 3, 2003	Haleakala	NEAT	·	4.6 km	MPC · JPL
235266	2003 TD_{9}	—	October 4, 2003	Kitt Peak	Spacewatch	·	4.4 km	MPC · JPL
235267	2003 TU_{11}	—	October 14, 2003	Anderson Mesa	LONEOS	·	5.1 km	MPC · JPL
235268	2003 TK_{12}	—	October 14, 2003	Anderson Mesa	LONEOS	·	2.6 km	MPC · JPL
235269	2003 TA_{21}	—	October 15, 2003	Anderson Mesa	LONEOS	·	5.3 km	MPC · JPL
235270	2003 TN_{31}	—	October 1, 2003	Kitt Peak	Spacewatch	(13314)	2.6 km	MPC · JPL
235271	2003 TX_{37}	—	October 2, 2003	Kitt Peak	Spacewatch	·	3.8 km	MPC · JPL
235272	2003 TK_{44}	—	October 2, 2003	Haleakala	NEAT	·	4.7 km	MPC · JPL
235273	2003 TA_{50}	—	October 3, 2003	Kitt Peak	Spacewatch	H	620 m	MPC · JPL
235274	2003 TE_{50}	—	October 3, 2003	Haleakala	NEAT	·	2.4 km	MPC · JPL
235275	2003 TO_{57}	—	October 6, 2003	Anderson Mesa	LONEOS	(11882)	2.0 km	MPC · JPL
235276	2003 TR_{58}	—	October 2, 2003	Kitt Peak	Spacewatch	·	2.2 km	MPC · JPL
235277	2003 UO_{8}	—	October 16, 2003	Anderson Mesa	LONEOS	·	3.1 km	MPC · JPL
235278	2003 UE_{11}	—	October 16, 2003	Anderson Mesa	LONEOS	H	730 m	MPC · JPL
235279	2003 UL_{17}	—	October 17, 2003	Anderson Mesa	LONEOS	·	3.1 km	MPC · JPL
235280	2003 UU_{17}	—	October 18, 2003	Kitt Peak	Spacewatch	NEM	3.5 km	MPC · JPL
235281	2003 UV_{17}	—	October 18, 2003	Saint-Sulpice	B. Christophe	EUP	5.4 km	MPC · JPL
235282	2003 UO_{19}	—	October 20, 2003	Kingsnake	J. V. McClusky	·	2.8 km	MPC · JPL
235283	2003 UC_{29}	—	October 22, 2003	Kvistaberg	Uppsala-DLR Asteroid Survey	·	5.3 km	MPC · JPL
235284	2003 UF_{32}	—	October 16, 2003	Kitt Peak	Spacewatch	·	1.8 km	MPC · JPL
235285	2003 UF_{34}	—	October 17, 2003	Kitt Peak	Spacewatch	·	2.1 km	MPC · JPL
235286	2003 UQ_{36}	—	October 16, 2003	Palomar	NEAT	LIX	5.2 km	MPC · JPL
235287	2003 UL_{41}	—	October 17, 2003	Kitt Peak	Spacewatch	AGN	1.3 km	MPC · JPL
235288	2003 UQ_{43}	—	October 17, 2003	Kitt Peak	Spacewatch	WIT	1.4 km	MPC · JPL
235289	2003 UJ_{49}	—	October 16, 2003	Palomar	NEAT	·	3.7 km	MPC · JPL
235290	2003 UU_{50}	—	October 18, 2003	Palomar	NEAT	·	3.0 km	MPC · JPL
235291	2003 UY_{56}	—	October 23, 2003	Kitt Peak	Spacewatch	EUP	7.1 km	MPC · JPL
235292	2003 UG_{58}	—	October 16, 2003	Kitt Peak	Spacewatch	·	2.6 km	MPC · JPL
235293	2003 UK_{66}	—	October 16, 2003	Palomar	NEAT	·	5.0 km	MPC · JPL
235294	2003 UC_{69}	—	October 18, 2003	Kitt Peak	Spacewatch	HOF	2.8 km	MPC · JPL
235295	2003 UU_{71}	—	October 19, 2003	Kitt Peak	Spacewatch	·	3.1 km	MPC · JPL
235296	2003 UW_{73}	—	October 28, 2003	Socorro	LINEAR	H	740 m	MPC · JPL
235297	2003 UN_{80}	—	October 16, 2003	Kitt Peak	Spacewatch	·	3.2 km	MPC · JPL
235298	2003 UQ_{80}	—	October 16, 2003	Kitt Peak	Spacewatch	·	1.8 km	MPC · JPL
235299	2003 UO_{83}	—	October 17, 2003	Anderson Mesa	LONEOS	·	4.8 km	MPC · JPL
235300	2003 UN_{86}	—	October 18, 2003	Palomar	NEAT	·	3.1 km	MPC · JPL

== 235301–235400 ==
back to top

Designation			Discovery			Properties		Ref
Permanent	Provisional	Named after	Date	Site	Discoverer(s)	Category	Diam.	Ref
235301	2003 UP_{91}	—	October 20, 2003	Kitt Peak	Spacewatch	KOR	1.8 km	MPC · JPL
235302	2003 UD_{93}	—	October 17, 2003	Anderson Mesa	LONEOS	·	4.6 km	MPC · JPL
235303	2003 UK_{94}	—	October 18, 2003	Kitt Peak	Spacewatch	·	2.1 km	MPC · JPL
235304	2003 UA_{96}	—	October 18, 2003	Kitt Peak	Spacewatch	NEM	3.1 km	MPC · JPL
235305	2003 UE_{97}	—	October 19, 2003	Kitt Peak	Spacewatch	·	2.3 km	MPC · JPL
235306	2003 UM_{109}	—	October 19, 2003	Kitt Peak	Spacewatch	LUT	7.5 km	MPC · JPL
235307	2003 UX_{112}	—	October 20, 2003	Socorro	LINEAR	·	2.4 km	MPC · JPL
235308	2003 UO_{114}	—	October 20, 2003	Kitt Peak	Spacewatch	AGN	1.3 km	MPC · JPL
235309	2003 UL_{122}	—	October 19, 2003	Kitt Peak	Spacewatch	HOF	3.6 km	MPC · JPL
235310	2003 UC_{126}	—	October 20, 2003	Kitt Peak	Spacewatch	HOF	3.1 km	MPC · JPL
235311	2003 UY_{128}	—	October 21, 2003	Kitt Peak	Spacewatch	·	2.3 km	MPC · JPL
235312	2003 UL_{133}	—	October 20, 2003	Palomar	NEAT	slow	2.4 km	MPC · JPL
235313	2003 UJ_{134}	—	October 20, 2003	Palomar	NEAT	·	2.9 km	MPC · JPL
235314	2003 UV_{140}	—	October 16, 2003	Palomar	NEAT	·	2.7 km	MPC · JPL
235315	2003 UP_{144}	—	October 18, 2003	Anderson Mesa	LONEOS	·	3.0 km	MPC · JPL
235316	2003 UV_{144}	—	October 18, 2003	Anderson Mesa	LONEOS	·	2.8 km	MPC · JPL
235317	2003 UK_{165}	—	October 21, 2003	Kitt Peak	Spacewatch	AGN	1.9 km	MPC · JPL
235318	2003 UD_{171}	—	October 19, 2003	Kitt Peak	Spacewatch	AGN	1.8 km	MPC · JPL
235319	2003 UG_{173}	—	October 20, 2003	Palomar	NEAT	·	4.4 km	MPC · JPL
235320	2003 UA_{175}	—	October 21, 2003	Kitt Peak	Spacewatch	·	2.1 km	MPC · JPL
235321	2003 UA_{178}	—	October 21, 2003	Socorro	LINEAR	·	5.2 km	MPC · JPL
235322	2003 UM_{178}	—	October 21, 2003	Socorro	LINEAR	·	2.8 km	MPC · JPL
235323	2003 UU_{181}	—	October 21, 2003	Palomar	NEAT	·	2.1 km	MPC · JPL
235324	2003 UM_{185}	—	October 21, 2003	Kitt Peak	Spacewatch	·	3.5 km	MPC · JPL
235325	2003 UF_{186}	—	October 22, 2003	Kitt Peak	Spacewatch	·	2.4 km	MPC · JPL
235326	2003 UY_{189}	—	October 22, 2003	Kitt Peak	Spacewatch	KOR	1.9 km	MPC · JPL
235327	2003 UY_{191}	—	October 23, 2003	Anderson Mesa	LONEOS	T_{j} (2.96)	6.0 km	MPC · JPL
235328	2003 UA_{195}	—	October 20, 2003	Kitt Peak	Spacewatch	·	3.0 km	MPC · JPL
235329	2003 UG_{196}	—	October 21, 2003	Kitt Peak	Spacewatch	·	2.3 km	MPC · JPL
235330	2003 UJ_{197}	—	October 21, 2003	Kitt Peak	Spacewatch	·	4.8 km	MPC · JPL
235331	2003 UM_{198}	—	October 21, 2003	Palomar	NEAT	·	3.2 km	MPC · JPL
235332	2003 UT_{199}	—	October 21, 2003	Socorro	LINEAR	·	2.8 km	MPC · JPL
235333	2003 UE_{201}	—	October 21, 2003	Socorro	LINEAR	·	3.6 km	MPC · JPL
235334	2003 UK_{203}	—	October 21, 2003	Kitt Peak	Spacewatch	·	2.7 km	MPC · JPL
235335	2003 UO_{207}	—	October 22, 2003	Kitt Peak	Spacewatch	HOF	3.5 km	MPC · JPL
235336	2003 UT_{210}	—	October 23, 2003	Kitt Peak	Spacewatch	·	3.8 km	MPC · JPL
235337	2003 UY_{215}	—	October 21, 2003	Kitt Peak	Spacewatch	BRA	2.6 km	MPC · JPL
235338	2003 UL_{216}	—	October 21, 2003	Socorro	LINEAR	·	3.6 km	MPC · JPL
235339	2003 UG_{222}	—	October 22, 2003	Socorro	LINEAR	·	1.8 km	MPC · JPL
235340	2003 UP_{224}	—	October 22, 2003	Kitt Peak	Spacewatch	·	2.6 km	MPC · JPL
235341	2003 UB_{238}	—	October 23, 2003	Haleakala	NEAT	·	2.6 km	MPC · JPL
235342	2003 UF_{242}	—	October 24, 2003	Socorro	LINEAR	·	1.9 km	MPC · JPL
235343	2003 UR_{242}	—	October 24, 2003	Socorro	LINEAR	·	3.6 km	MPC · JPL
235344	2003 UC_{248}	—	October 25, 2003	Kitt Peak	Spacewatch	·	2.0 km	MPC · JPL
235345	2003 UL_{255}	—	October 25, 2003	Socorro	LINEAR	(5)	2.2 km	MPC · JPL
235346	2003 UH_{259}	—	October 25, 2003	Socorro	LINEAR	·	3.1 km	MPC · JPL
235347	2003 UP_{260}	—	October 25, 2003	Kitt Peak	Spacewatch	·	2.4 km	MPC · JPL
235348	2003 UQ_{266}	—	October 28, 2003	Socorro	LINEAR	·	4.5 km	MPC · JPL
235349	2003 UM_{268}	—	October 28, 2003	Socorro	LINEAR	·	2.8 km	MPC · JPL
235350	2003 UW_{268}	—	October 28, 2003	Kitt Peak	Spacewatch	·	1.6 km	MPC · JPL
235351	2003 UD_{273}	—	October 29, 2003	Socorro	LINEAR	·	4.0 km	MPC · JPL
235352	2003 UN_{282}	—	October 29, 2003	Anderson Mesa	LONEOS	KON	3.8 km	MPC · JPL
235353	2003 UZ_{303}	—	October 17, 2003	Kitt Peak	Spacewatch	·	3.1 km	MPC · JPL
235354	2003 UP_{315}	—	October 19, 2003	Anderson Mesa	LONEOS	LIX	4.2 km	MPC · JPL
235355	2003 UE_{323}	—	October 16, 2003	Kitt Peak	Spacewatch	·	5.9 km	MPC · JPL
235356	2003 UZ_{329}	—	October 17, 2003	Kitt Peak	Spacewatch	·	2.0 km	MPC · JPL
235357	2003 UH_{337}	—	October 18, 2003	Apache Point	SDSS	·	1.5 km	MPC · JPL
235358	2003 UJ_{343}	—	October 19, 2003	Apache Point	SDSS	·	4.2 km	MPC · JPL
235359	2003 US_{343}	—	October 19, 2003	Kitt Peak	Spacewatch	·	2.0 km	MPC · JPL
235360	2003 UE_{359}	—	October 19, 2003	Kitt Peak	Spacewatch	HOF	3.3 km	MPC · JPL
235361	2003 UT_{365}	—	October 20, 2003	Kitt Peak	Spacewatch	KOR	1.5 km	MPC · JPL
235362	2003 UQ_{378}	—	October 22, 2003	Apache Point	SDSS	·	1.6 km	MPC · JPL
235363	2003 VU_{2}	—	November 6, 2003	Socorro	LINEAR	·	6.6 km	MPC · JPL
235364	2003 WU_{6}	—	November 18, 2003	Palomar	NEAT	·	2.5 km	MPC · JPL
235365	2003 WF_{9}	—	November 16, 2003	Kitt Peak	Spacewatch	·	6.1 km	MPC · JPL
235366	2003 WN_{11}	—	November 18, 2003	Palomar	NEAT	·	5.7 km	MPC · JPL
235367	2003 WL_{20}	—	November 19, 2003	Socorro	LINEAR	·	4.3 km	MPC · JPL
235368	2003 WY_{23}	—	November 18, 2003	Kitt Peak	Spacewatch	HOF	5.0 km	MPC · JPL
235369	2003 WZ_{23}	—	November 18, 2003	Kitt Peak	Spacewatch	HOF	4.6 km	MPC · JPL
235370	2003 WX_{24}	—	November 20, 2003	Socorro	LINEAR	H	900 m	MPC · JPL
235371	2003 WS_{27}	—	November 16, 2003	Kitt Peak	Spacewatch	MRX	1.3 km	MPC · JPL
235372	2003 WP_{37}	—	November 19, 2003	Socorro	LINEAR	·	5.6 km	MPC · JPL
235373	2003 WU_{38}	—	November 19, 2003	Socorro	LINEAR	·	5.6 km	MPC · JPL
235374	2003 WE_{39}	—	November 19, 2003	Kitt Peak	Spacewatch	·	2.8 km	MPC · JPL
235375	2003 WJ_{42}	—	November 21, 2003	Socorro	LINEAR	ADE	3.9 km	MPC · JPL
235376	2003 WK_{44}	—	November 19, 2003	Palomar	NEAT	·	3.9 km	MPC · JPL
235377	2003 WL_{44}	—	November 19, 2003	Palomar	NEAT	·	4.4 km	MPC · JPL
235378	2003 WT_{48}	—	November 19, 2003	Catalina	CSS	·	3.6 km	MPC · JPL
235379	2003 WY_{57}	—	November 18, 2003	Kitt Peak	Spacewatch	·	3.4 km	MPC · JPL
235380	2003 WL_{62}	—	November 19, 2003	Kitt Peak	Spacewatch	·	3.5 km	MPC · JPL
235381	2003 WK_{66}	—	November 19, 2003	Socorro	LINEAR	TIR	4.6 km	MPC · JPL
235382	2003 WV_{77}	—	November 20, 2003	Socorro	LINEAR	·	3.8 km	MPC · JPL
235383	2003 WE_{80}	—	November 20, 2003	Socorro	LINEAR	(116763)	2.3 km	MPC · JPL
235384	2003 WQ_{81}	—	November 18, 2003	Kitt Peak	Spacewatch	ADE	3.8 km	MPC · JPL
235385	2003 WB_{83}	—	November 20, 2003	Palomar	NEAT	·	3.4 km	MPC · JPL
235386	2003 WL_{83}	—	November 20, 2003	Socorro	LINEAR	·	3.8 km	MPC · JPL
235387	2003 WC_{96}	—	November 19, 2003	Anderson Mesa	LONEOS	THM	3.4 km	MPC · JPL
235388	2003 WG_{96}	—	November 19, 2003	Anderson Mesa	LONEOS	·	2.8 km	MPC · JPL
235389	2003 WV_{96}	—	November 19, 2003	Anderson Mesa	LONEOS	AGN	1.9 km	MPC · JPL
235390	2003 WG_{99}	—	November 20, 2003	Socorro	LINEAR	·	4.9 km	MPC · JPL
235391	2003 WT_{101}	—	November 21, 2003	Socorro	LINEAR	·	2.3 km	MPC · JPL
235392	2003 WS_{125}	—	November 20, 2003	Socorro	LINEAR	·	4.7 km	MPC · JPL
235393	2003 WF_{130}	—	November 21, 2003	Socorro	LINEAR	·	5.2 km	MPC · JPL
235394	2003 WX_{134}	—	November 21, 2003	Socorro	LINEAR	·	2.6 km	MPC · JPL
235395	2003 WS_{151}	—	November 26, 2003	Kitt Peak	Spacewatch	·	2.5 km	MPC · JPL
235396	2003 WH_{155}	—	November 26, 2003	Kitt Peak	Spacewatch	·	2.8 km	MPC · JPL
235397	2003 WD_{161}	—	November 30, 2003	Kitt Peak	Spacewatch	KOR	1.8 km	MPC · JPL
235398	2003 WV_{162}	—	November 30, 2003	Kitt Peak	Spacewatch	·	3.2 km	MPC · JPL
235399	2003 WN_{163}	—	November 30, 2003	Kitt Peak	Spacewatch	·	2.1 km	MPC · JPL
235400	2003 WE_{169}	—	November 19, 2003	Palomar	NEAT	LIX	6.3 km	MPC · JPL

== 235401–235500 ==
back to top

Designation			Discovery			Properties		Ref
Permanent	Provisional	Named after	Date	Site	Discoverer(s)	Category	Diam.	Ref
235401	2003 WL_{169}	—	November 19, 2003	Socorro	LINEAR	THB	6.2 km	MPC · JPL
235402	2003 WR_{173}	—	November 18, 2003	Kitt Peak	Spacewatch	·	6.7 km	MPC · JPL
235403 Alysenregiec	2003 WM_{185}	Alysenregiec	November 21, 2003	Kitt Peak	M. W. Buie	KOR	2.1 km	MPC · JPL
235404	2003 XU_{1}	—	December 1, 2003	Socorro	LINEAR	·	2.3 km	MPC · JPL
235405	2003 XK_{2}	—	December 1, 2003	Socorro	LINEAR	·	3.5 km	MPC · JPL
235406	2003 XX_{14}	—	December 15, 2003	Socorro	LINEAR	EUP	4.9 km	MPC · JPL
235407	2003 XX_{18}	—	December 14, 2003	Kitt Peak	Spacewatch	·	4.0 km	MPC · JPL
235408	2003 XF_{20}	—	December 14, 2003	Kitt Peak	Spacewatch	·	2.7 km	MPC · JPL
235409	2003 XS_{22}	—	December 1, 2003	Kitt Peak	Spacewatch	·	4.5 km	MPC · JPL
235410	2003 XR_{33}	—	December 1, 2003	Kitt Peak	Spacewatch	AGN	1.3 km	MPC · JPL
235411	2003 XJ_{34}	—	December 1, 2003	Kitt Peak	Spacewatch	·	2.0 km	MPC · JPL
235412	2003 XM_{38}	—	December 4, 2003	Socorro	LINEAR	·	4.0 km	MPC · JPL
235413	2003 YY_{2}	—	December 19, 2003	Nashville	Clingan, R.	THM	3.5 km	MPC · JPL
235414	2003 YM_{11}	—	December 17, 2003	Socorro	LINEAR	·	5.1 km	MPC · JPL
235415	2003 YL_{16}	—	December 17, 2003	Anderson Mesa	LONEOS	·	5.5 km	MPC · JPL
235416	2003 YO_{19}	—	December 17, 2003	Kitt Peak	Spacewatch	·	2.5 km	MPC · JPL
235417	2003 YF_{24}	—	December 17, 2003	Kitt Peak	Spacewatch	·	3.5 km	MPC · JPL
235418	2003 YB_{31}	—	December 18, 2003	Socorro	LINEAR	EOS	3.0 km	MPC · JPL
235419	2003 YJ_{31}	—	December 18, 2003	Socorro	LINEAR	·	5.7 km	MPC · JPL
235420	2003 YA_{34}	—	December 17, 2003	Socorro	LINEAR	NAE	5.8 km	MPC · JPL
235421	2003 YW_{37}	—	December 18, 2003	Socorro	LINEAR	EOS	3.3 km	MPC · JPL
235422	2003 YQ_{41}	—	December 19, 2003	Kitt Peak	Spacewatch	·	4.0 km	MPC · JPL
235423	2003 YQ_{45}	—	December 17, 2003	Anderson Mesa	LONEOS	·	3.1 km	MPC · JPL
235424	2003 YF_{51}	—	December 18, 2003	Socorro	LINEAR	·	4.1 km	MPC · JPL
235425	2003 YA_{69}	—	December 20, 2003	Socorro	LINEAR	·	2.8 km	MPC · JPL
235426	2003 YH_{70}	—	December 21, 2003	Socorro	LINEAR	·	2.9 km	MPC · JPL
235427	2003 YP_{70}	—	December 19, 2003	Socorro	LINEAR	H	900 m	MPC · JPL
235428	2003 YK_{71}	—	December 18, 2003	Socorro	LINEAR	·	6.8 km	MPC · JPL
235429	2003 YM_{79}	—	December 18, 2003	Socorro	LINEAR	·	4.1 km	MPC · JPL
235430	2003 YL_{81}	—	December 18, 2003	Socorro	LINEAR	·	3.5 km	MPC · JPL
235431	2003 YW_{87}	—	December 19, 2003	Socorro	LINEAR	THB	4.2 km	MPC · JPL
235432	2003 YF_{92}	—	December 21, 2003	Socorro	LINEAR	·	4.5 km	MPC · JPL
235433	2003 YW_{93}	—	December 21, 2003	Kitt Peak	Spacewatch	EUP	5.6 km	MPC · JPL
235434	2003 YM_{97}	—	December 19, 2003	Socorro	LINEAR	·	3.0 km	MPC · JPL
235435	2003 YP_{106}	—	December 22, 2003	Socorro	LINEAR	·	4.3 km	MPC · JPL
235436	2003 YS_{109}	—	December 22, 2003	Kitt Peak	Spacewatch	·	3.1 km	MPC · JPL
235437	2003 YZ_{111}	—	December 23, 2003	Socorro	LINEAR	·	4.1 km	MPC · JPL
235438	2003 YG_{112}	—	December 23, 2003	Socorro	LINEAR	·	3.6 km	MPC · JPL
235439	2003 YN_{115}	—	December 27, 2003	Socorro	LINEAR	·	2.4 km	MPC · JPL
235440	2003 YK_{120}	—	December 27, 2003	Socorro	LINEAR	·	2.4 km	MPC · JPL
235441	2003 YV_{123}	—	December 28, 2003	Kitt Peak	Spacewatch	KOR	1.6 km	MPC · JPL
235442	2003 YZ_{131}	—	December 28, 2003	Socorro	LINEAR	EOS	2.6 km	MPC · JPL
235443	2003 YE_{132}	—	December 28, 2003	Socorro	LINEAR	·	3.1 km	MPC · JPL
235444	2003 YF_{132}	—	December 28, 2003	Socorro	LINEAR	·	4.3 km	MPC · JPL
235445	2003 YF_{134}	—	December 28, 2003	Socorro	LINEAR	·	6.3 km	MPC · JPL
235446	2003 YT_{139}	—	December 28, 2003	Kitt Peak	Spacewatch	·	5.1 km	MPC · JPL
235447	2003 YB_{141}	—	December 28, 2003	Socorro	LINEAR	EOS	2.7 km	MPC · JPL
235448	2003 YH_{141}	—	December 28, 2003	Socorro	LINEAR	·	3.2 km	MPC · JPL
235449	2003 YZ_{145}	—	December 28, 2003	Socorro	LINEAR	·	4.1 km	MPC · JPL
235450	2003 YB_{147}	—	December 29, 2003	Socorro	LINEAR	·	3.3 km	MPC · JPL
235451	2003 YL_{148}	—	December 29, 2003	Catalina	CSS	THB	4.2 km	MPC · JPL
235452	2003 YZ_{148}	—	December 29, 2003	Socorro	LINEAR	CYB	6.3 km	MPC · JPL
235453	2003 YN_{149}	—	December 29, 2003	Catalina	CSS	·	4.8 km	MPC · JPL
235454	2003 YA_{150}	—	December 29, 2003	Socorro	LINEAR	·	3.3 km	MPC · JPL
235455	2003 YS_{150}	—	December 29, 2003	Catalina	CSS	·	3.7 km	MPC · JPL
235456	2003 YC_{151}	—	December 29, 2003	Catalina	CSS	·	3.7 km	MPC · JPL
235457	2003 YP_{153}	—	December 29, 2003	Socorro	LINEAR	·	5.4 km	MPC · JPL
235458	2003 YZ_{156}	—	December 16, 2003	Kitt Peak	Spacewatch	·	4.4 km	MPC · JPL
235459	2003 YP_{162}	—	December 17, 2003	Socorro	LINEAR	EOS	3.9 km	MPC · JPL
235460	2003 YS_{162}	—	December 17, 2003	Socorro	LINEAR	·	5.8 km	MPC · JPL
235461	2003 YG_{164}	—	December 17, 2003	Kitt Peak	Spacewatch	·	3.4 km	MPC · JPL
235462	2003 YN_{165}	—	December 17, 2003	Kitt Peak	Spacewatch	KOR	1.9 km	MPC · JPL
235463	2003 YQ_{165}	—	December 17, 2003	Kitt Peak	Spacewatch	·	2.0 km	MPC · JPL
235464	2003 YS_{165}	—	December 17, 2003	Anderson Mesa	LONEOS	EOS	3.0 km	MPC · JPL
235465	2003 YL_{174}	—	December 19, 2003	Kitt Peak	Spacewatch	·	2.8 km	MPC · JPL
235466	2003 YB_{182}	—	December 29, 2003	Kitt Peak	Spacewatch	THM	3.3 km	MPC · JPL
235467	2004 AA_{3}	—	January 5, 2004	Catalina	CSS	TIR	4.2 km	MPC · JPL
235468	2004 AB_{3}	—	January 11, 2004	Palomar	NEAT	·	5.0 km	MPC · JPL
235469	2004 AH_{14}	—	January 13, 2004	Palomar	NEAT	EOS	2.7 km	MPC · JPL
235470	2004 AF_{22}	—	January 15, 2004	Kitt Peak	Spacewatch	THM	3.0 km	MPC · JPL
235471	2004 BZ_{15}	—	January 18, 2004	Palomar	NEAT	·	2.7 km	MPC · JPL
235472	2004 BX_{17}	—	January 18, 2004	Catalina	CSS	·	5.5 km	MPC · JPL
235473	2004 BY_{17}	—	January 18, 2004	Catalina	CSS	·	4.0 km	MPC · JPL
235474	2004 BH_{18}	—	January 18, 2004	Palomar	NEAT	·	5.1 km	MPC · JPL
235475	2004 BK_{25}	—	January 19, 2004	Catalina	CSS	EOS	3.1 km	MPC · JPL
235476	2004 BG_{32}	—	January 19, 2004	Kitt Peak	Spacewatch	·	3.4 km	MPC · JPL
235477	2004 BZ_{35}	—	January 19, 2004	Kitt Peak	Spacewatch	·	3.4 km	MPC · JPL
235478	2004 BM_{36}	—	January 19, 2004	Kitt Peak	Spacewatch	·	2.8 km	MPC · JPL
235479	2004 BF_{38}	—	January 19, 2004	Catalina	CSS	T_{j} (2.96)	6.3 km	MPC · JPL
235480	2004 BL_{42}	—	January 21, 2004	Socorro	LINEAR	·	3.9 km	MPC · JPL
235481	2004 BM_{45}	—	January 21, 2004	Socorro	LINEAR	·	2.7 km	MPC · JPL
235482	2004 BS_{46}	—	January 21, 2004	Socorro	LINEAR	TIR	5.0 km	MPC · JPL
235483	2004 BQ_{51}	—	January 21, 2004	Socorro	LINEAR	URS	6.5 km	MPC · JPL
235484	2004 BE_{53}	—	January 22, 2004	Socorro	LINEAR	·	3.2 km	MPC · JPL
235485	2004 BD_{56}	—	January 23, 2004	Anderson Mesa	LONEOS	·	4.3 km	MPC · JPL
235486	2004 BT_{64}	—	January 22, 2004	Socorro	LINEAR	·	2.5 km	MPC · JPL
235487	2004 BC_{67}	—	January 24, 2004	Socorro	LINEAR	·	5.5 km	MPC · JPL
235488	2004 BJ_{67}	—	January 24, 2004	Socorro	LINEAR	·	3.3 km	MPC · JPL
235489	2004 BJ_{73}	—	January 24, 2004	Socorro	LINEAR	·	5.1 km	MPC · JPL
235490	2004 BV_{73}	—	January 24, 2004	Socorro	LINEAR	TIR	4.8 km	MPC · JPL
235491	2004 BX_{86}	—	January 22, 2004	Socorro	LINEAR	T_{j} (2.98)	4.8 km	MPC · JPL
235492	2004 BK_{89}	—	January 23, 2004	Socorro	LINEAR	THB	4.4 km	MPC · JPL
235493	2004 BP_{91}	—	January 24, 2004	Socorro	LINEAR	·	5.5 km	MPC · JPL
235494	2004 BZ_{91}	—	January 26, 2004	Anderson Mesa	LONEOS	·	4.1 km	MPC · JPL
235495	2004 BE_{92}	—	January 26, 2004	Anderson Mesa	LONEOS	EUP	6.5 km	MPC · JPL
235496	2004 BN_{93}	—	January 28, 2004	Socorro	LINEAR	THB	4.8 km	MPC · JPL
235497	2004 BP_{94}	—	January 28, 2004	Socorro	LINEAR	EUP	7.3 km	MPC · JPL
235498	2004 BH_{97}	—	January 24, 2004	Socorro	LINEAR	·	6.1 km	MPC · JPL
235499	2004 BQ_{101}	—	January 28, 2004	Socorro	LINEAR	·	6.5 km	MPC · JPL
235500	2004 BU_{101}	—	January 29, 2004	Socorro	LINEAR	·	5.6 km	MPC · JPL

== 235501–235600 ==
back to top

Designation			Discovery			Properties		Ref
Permanent	Provisional	Named after	Date	Site	Discoverer(s)	Category	Diam.	Ref
235501	2004 BK_{103}	—	January 31, 2004	Socorro	LINEAR	T_{j} (2.96)	6.2 km	MPC · JPL
235502	2004 BV_{105}	—	January 26, 2004	Anderson Mesa	LONEOS	·	3.3 km	MPC · JPL
235503	2004 BL_{106}	—	January 26, 2004	Anderson Mesa	LONEOS	·	4.5 km	MPC · JPL
235504	2004 BH_{114}	—	January 29, 2004	Catalina	CSS	T_{j} (2.98) · EUP	7.0 km	MPC · JPL
235505	2004 BY_{115}	—	January 26, 2004	Anderson Mesa	LONEOS	EOS	4.9 km	MPC · JPL
235506	2004 BC_{119}	—	January 30, 2004	Socorro	LINEAR	EMA	5.4 km	MPC · JPL
235507	2004 BO_{120}	—	January 31, 2004	Socorro	LINEAR	·	5.5 km	MPC · JPL
235508	2004 BG_{132}	—	January 17, 2004	Palomar	NEAT	·	3.5 km	MPC · JPL
235509	2004 BH_{138}	—	January 19, 2004	Kitt Peak	Spacewatch	·	2.6 km	MPC · JPL
235510	2004 BD_{146}	—	January 22, 2004	Socorro	LINEAR	·	3.0 km	MPC · JPL
235511	2004 BP_{147}	—	January 16, 2004	Kitt Peak	Spacewatch	·	3.1 km	MPC · JPL
235512	2004 BM_{148}	—	January 16, 2004	Kitt Peak	Spacewatch	·	4.4 km	MPC · JPL
235513	2004 BM_{152}	—	January 20, 2004	Socorro	LINEAR	·	4.9 km	MPC · JPL
235514	2004 BX_{152}	—	January 27, 2004	Kitt Peak	Spacewatch	THM	2.2 km	MPC · JPL
235515	2004 BL_{154}	—	January 28, 2004	Kitt Peak	Spacewatch	HYG	2.6 km	MPC · JPL
235516	2004 BC_{158}	—	January 28, 2004	Socorro	LINEAR	·	5.2 km	MPC · JPL
235517	2004 BU_{161}	—	January 19, 2004	Kitt Peak	Spacewatch	·	3.7 km	MPC · JPL
235518	2004 CE_{2}	—	February 12, 2004	Desert Eagle	W. K. Y. Yeung	·	3.1 km	MPC · JPL
235519	2004 CA_{3}	—	February 9, 2004	Palomar	NEAT	·	4.2 km	MPC · JPL
235520	2004 CC_{3}	—	February 9, 2004	Palomar	NEAT	EOS	2.7 km	MPC · JPL
235521	2004 CR_{4}	—	February 10, 2004	Palomar	NEAT	·	3.1 km	MPC · JPL
235522	2004 CJ_{6}	—	February 10, 2004	Palomar	NEAT	·	4.8 km	MPC · JPL
235523	2004 CG_{20}	—	February 11, 2004	Kitt Peak	Spacewatch	·	3.2 km	MPC · JPL
235524	2004 CR_{21}	—	February 11, 2004	Anderson Mesa	LONEOS	·	3.7 km	MPC · JPL
235525	2004 CJ_{32}	—	February 12, 2004	Kitt Peak	Spacewatch	·	3.7 km	MPC · JPL
235526	2004 CJ_{51}	—	February 13, 2004	Desert Eagle	W. K. Y. Yeung	·	4.7 km	MPC · JPL
235527	2004 CJ_{60}	—	February 11, 2004	Palomar	NEAT	·	3.9 km	MPC · JPL
235528	2004 CJ_{62}	—	February 11, 2004	Palomar	NEAT	·	3.2 km	MPC · JPL
235529	2004 CA_{63}	—	February 12, 2004	Palomar	NEAT	(31811)	3.9 km	MPC · JPL
235530	2004 CP_{63}	—	February 12, 2004	Palomar	NEAT	·	6.2 km	MPC · JPL
235531	2004 CS_{67}	—	February 10, 2004	Palomar	NEAT	HYG	3.1 km	MPC · JPL
235532	2004 CD_{68}	—	February 10, 2004	Palomar	NEAT	TIR	4.5 km	MPC · JPL
235533	2004 CJ_{70}	—	February 12, 2004	Kitt Peak	Spacewatch	·	4.4 km	MPC · JPL
235534	2004 CS_{70}	—	February 12, 2004	Kitt Peak	Spacewatch	THM	3.1 km	MPC · JPL
235535	2004 CU_{70}	—	February 12, 2004	Kitt Peak	Spacewatch	HYG	3.7 km	MPC · JPL
235536	2004 CT_{82}	—	February 12, 2004	Kitt Peak	Spacewatch	·	4.5 km	MPC · JPL
235537	2004 CW_{94}	—	February 12, 2004	Palomar	NEAT	·	4.4 km	MPC · JPL
235538	2004 CY_{101}	—	February 12, 2004	Palomar	NEAT	·	3.4 km	MPC · JPL
235539	2004 CX_{105}	—	February 14, 2004	Palomar	NEAT	·	4.0 km	MPC · JPL
235540	2004 CE_{108}	—	February 14, 2004	Haleakala	NEAT	VER	5.1 km	MPC · JPL
235541	2004 CS_{112}	—	February 13, 2004	Anderson Mesa	LONEOS	·	3.3 km	MPC · JPL
235542	2004 DL_{4}	—	February 16, 2004	Kitt Peak	Spacewatch	·	4.3 km	MPC · JPL
235543	2004 DG_{15}	—	February 17, 2004	Socorro	LINEAR	·	4.7 km	MPC · JPL
235544	2004 DH_{15}	—	February 17, 2004	Socorro	LINEAR	·	5.4 km	MPC · JPL
235545	2004 DR_{19}	—	February 17, 2004	Socorro	LINEAR	·	4.1 km	MPC · JPL
235546	2004 DR_{26}	—	February 16, 2004	Socorro	LINEAR	(11097)	2.4 km	MPC · JPL
235547	2004 DA_{27}	—	February 16, 2004	Kitt Peak	Spacewatch	·	3.1 km	MPC · JPL
235548	2004 DY_{28}	—	February 17, 2004	Kitt Peak	Spacewatch	·	3.8 km	MPC · JPL
235549	2004 DV_{65}	—	February 23, 2004	Socorro	LINEAR	·	4.6 km	MPC · JPL
235550	2004 EW_{11}	—	March 11, 2004	Palomar	NEAT	VER	5.7 km	MPC · JPL
235551	2004 EW_{18}	—	March 14, 2004	Socorro	LINEAR	·	4.4 km	MPC · JPL
235552	2004 EC_{50}	—	March 12, 2004	Palomar	NEAT	·	4.3 km	MPC · JPL
235553	2004 ED_{63}	—	March 13, 2004	Palomar	NEAT	·	5.9 km	MPC · JPL
235554	2004 EO_{85}	—	March 15, 2004	Socorro	LINEAR	HYG	4.2 km	MPC · JPL
235555	2004 EA_{114}	—	March 15, 2004	Kitt Peak	Spacewatch	·	5.9 km	MPC · JPL
235556	2004 FV_{21}	—	March 16, 2004	Kitt Peak	Spacewatch	·	4.0 km	MPC · JPL
235557	2004 FW_{26}	—	March 17, 2004	Kitt Peak	Spacewatch	VER	4.1 km	MPC · JPL
235558	2004 FD_{51}	—	March 18, 2004	Kitt Peak	Spacewatch	·	4.7 km	MPC · JPL
235559	2004 FL_{92}	—	March 18, 2004	Socorro	LINEAR	·	4.4 km	MPC · JPL
235560	2004 FU_{98}	—	March 19, 2004	Socorro	LINEAR	·	1.5 km	MPC · JPL
235561	2004 FU_{158}	—	March 18, 2004	Kitt Peak	Spacewatch	THM	3.0 km	MPC · JPL
235562	2004 GW_{1}	—	April 11, 2004	Catalina	CSS	·	2.3 km	MPC · JPL
235563	2004 GE_{12}	—	April 13, 2004	Siding Spring	SSS	PHO	2.3 km	MPC · JPL
235564	2004 GS_{17}	—	April 12, 2004	Kitt Peak	Spacewatch	·	870 m	MPC · JPL
235565	2004 GU_{39}	—	April 15, 2004	Siding Spring	SSS	·	1.4 km	MPC · JPL
235566	2004 GP_{73}	—	April 14, 2004	Bergisch Gladbach	W. Bickel	·	4.3 km	MPC · JPL
235567	2004 HK_{15}	—	April 16, 2004	Kitt Peak	Spacewatch	3:2	6.7 km	MPC · JPL
235568	2004 HN_{33}	—	April 16, 2004	Socorro	LINEAR	EUP	5.1 km	MPC · JPL
235569	2004 HC_{53}	—	April 25, 2004	Catalina	CSS	·	6.1 km	MPC · JPL
235570	2004 HW_{55}	—	April 24, 2004	Socorro	LINEAR	ELF	7.0 km	MPC · JPL
235571	2004 JC_{35}	—	May 15, 2004	Socorro	LINEAR	·	3.8 km	MPC · JPL
235572	2004 JN_{45}	—	May 11, 2004	Anderson Mesa	LONEOS	·	4.7 km	MPC · JPL
235573	2004 KB_{8}	—	May 21, 2004	Socorro	LINEAR	·	1.4 km	MPC · JPL
235574	2004 KO_{8}	—	May 18, 2004	Socorro	LINEAR	CYB	6.5 km	MPC · JPL
235575	2004 KP_{10}	—	May 22, 2004	Socorro	LINEAR	·	1.1 km	MPC · JPL
235576	2004 LN_{18}	—	June 12, 2004	Palomar	NEAT	·	3.1 km	MPC · JPL
235577	2004 LO_{28}	—	June 14, 2004	Kitt Peak	Spacewatch	·	900 m	MPC · JPL
235578	2004 MP_{2}	—	June 18, 2004	Socorro	LINEAR	PHO	3.2 km	MPC · JPL
235579	2004 MR_{2}	—	June 18, 2004	Catalina	CSS	·	3.2 km	MPC · JPL
235580	2004 NX_{27}	—	July 11, 2004	Socorro	LINEAR	·	1.3 km	MPC · JPL
235581	2004 NB_{33}	—	July 10, 2004	Palomar	NEAT	HOF	3.2 km	MPC · JPL
235582	2004 NP_{33}	—	July 10, 2004	Catalina	CSS	V	950 m	MPC · JPL
235583	2004 OG_{7}	—	July 16, 2004	Socorro	LINEAR	·	940 m	MPC · JPL
235584	2004 OY_{12}	—	July 16, 2004	Socorro	LINEAR	T_{j} (2.97) · 3:2	7.5 km	MPC · JPL
235585	2004 PY_{1}	—	August 6, 2004	Reedy Creek	J. Broughton	V	920 m	MPC · JPL
235586	2004 PG_{3}	—	August 3, 2004	Siding Spring	SSS	·	830 m	MPC · JPL
235587	2004 PD_{8}	—	August 6, 2004	Palomar	NEAT	·	1.2 km	MPC · JPL
235588	2004 PF_{8}	—	August 6, 2004	Palomar	NEAT	·	2.5 km	MPC · JPL
235589	2004 PC_{13}	—	August 7, 2004	Palomar	NEAT	V	830 m	MPC · JPL
235590	2004 PS_{16}	—	August 7, 2004	Siding Spring	SSS	·	1.1 km	MPC · JPL
235591	2004 PR_{25}	—	August 8, 2004	Socorro	LINEAR	·	3.7 km	MPC · JPL
235592	2004 PQ_{28}	—	August 6, 2004	Palomar	NEAT	·	1.3 km	MPC · JPL
235593	2004 PZ_{28}	—	August 6, 2004	Palomar	NEAT	V	920 m	MPC · JPL
235594	2004 PX_{40}	—	August 9, 2004	Socorro	LINEAR	NYS	1.4 km	MPC · JPL
235595	2004 PZ_{44}	—	August 7, 2004	Palomar	NEAT	·	1.8 km	MPC · JPL
235596	2004 PP_{46}	—	August 7, 2004	Campo Imperatore	CINEOS	V	700 m	MPC · JPL
235597	2004 PJ_{49}	—	August 8, 2004	Palomar	NEAT	·	1.6 km	MPC · JPL
235598	2004 PB_{50}	—	August 8, 2004	Socorro	LINEAR	·	1.1 km	MPC · JPL
235599	2004 PB_{52}	—	August 8, 2004	Socorro	LINEAR	·	1.7 km	MPC · JPL
235600	2004 PV_{55}	—	August 8, 2004	Anderson Mesa	LONEOS	·	1.2 km	MPC · JPL

== 235601–235700 ==
back to top

Designation			Discovery			Properties		Ref
Permanent	Provisional	Named after	Date	Site	Discoverer(s)	Category	Diam.	Ref
235601	2004 PW_{56}	—	August 9, 2004	Socorro	LINEAR	·	1.2 km	MPC · JPL
235602	2004 PM_{59}	—	August 9, 2004	Anderson Mesa	LONEOS	·	2.2 km	MPC · JPL
235603	2004 PP_{60}	—	August 9, 2004	Socorro	LINEAR	·	970 m	MPC · JPL
235604	2004 PQ_{61}	—	August 9, 2004	Socorro	LINEAR	·	1.4 km	MPC · JPL
235605	2004 PN_{64}	—	August 10, 2004	Socorro	LINEAR	NYS	1.5 km	MPC · JPL
235606	2004 PA_{70}	—	August 7, 2004	Palomar	NEAT	V	800 m	MPC · JPL
235607	2004 PA_{73}	—	August 8, 2004	Socorro	LINEAR	·	1.7 km	MPC · JPL
235608	2004 PC_{79}	—	August 9, 2004	Socorro	LINEAR	·	3.8 km	MPC · JPL
235609	2004 PQ_{81}	—	August 10, 2004	Socorro	LINEAR	·	1.1 km	MPC · JPL
235610	2004 PH_{92}	—	August 12, 2004	Palomar	NEAT	·	4.1 km	MPC · JPL
235611	2004 PU_{99}	—	August 11, 2004	Socorro	LINEAR	·	1.0 km	MPC · JPL
235612	2004 PC_{101}	—	August 11, 2004	Socorro	LINEAR	·	1.4 km	MPC · JPL
235613	2004 PO_{102}	—	August 12, 2004	Socorro	LINEAR	V	860 m	MPC · JPL
235614	2004 PX_{103}	—	August 12, 2004	Socorro	LINEAR	·	4.0 km	MPC · JPL
235615 Rosromkondratyuk	2004 PS_{104}	Rosromkondratyuk	August 13, 2004	Andrushivka	Andrushivka	·	4.1 km	MPC · JPL
235616	2004 PV_{105}	—	August 15, 2004	Siding Spring	SSS	·	1.9 km	MPC · JPL
235617	2004 PB_{106}	—	August 15, 2004	Siding Spring	SSS	V	1.2 km	MPC · JPL
235618	2004 QU_{7}	—	August 22, 2004	Bergisch Gladbach	W. Bickel	·	1.4 km	MPC · JPL
235619	2004 QF_{27}	—	August 19, 2004	Siding Spring	SSS	·	1.7 km	MPC · JPL
235620	2004 RQ_{2}	—	September 5, 2004	Bergisch Gladbach	W. Bickel	·	810 m	MPC · JPL
235621 Kratochvíle	2004 RK_{3}	Kratochvíle	September 5, 2004	Kleť	KLENOT	·	1.2 km	MPC · JPL
235622	2004 RU_{12}	—	September 3, 2004	Anderson Mesa	LONEOS	·	4.2 km	MPC · JPL
235623	2004 RV_{12}	—	September 4, 2004	Needville	J. Dellinger, A. Lowe	·	2.1 km	MPC · JPL
235624	2004 RS_{13}	—	September 6, 2004	Needville	Needville	·	2.0 km	MPC · JPL
235625	2004 RH_{17}	—	September 7, 2004	Kitt Peak	Spacewatch	·	1.1 km	MPC · JPL
235626	2004 RO_{17}	—	September 7, 2004	Socorro	LINEAR	slow	1.2 km	MPC · JPL
235627	2004 RN_{20}	—	September 7, 2004	Kitt Peak	Spacewatch	V	1.0 km	MPC · JPL
235628	2004 RJ_{32}	—	September 7, 2004	Socorro	LINEAR	·	1.6 km	MPC · JPL
235629	2004 RH_{33}	—	September 7, 2004	Socorro	LINEAR	·	3.7 km	MPC · JPL
235630	2004 RX_{38}	—	September 7, 2004	Socorro	LINEAR	·	1.1 km	MPC · JPL
235631	2004 RK_{40}	—	September 7, 2004	Kitt Peak	Spacewatch	·	1.5 km	MPC · JPL
235632	2004 RV_{49}	—	September 8, 2004	Socorro	LINEAR	V	830 m	MPC · JPL
235633	2004 RF_{52}	—	September 8, 2004	Socorro	LINEAR	MAS	980 m	MPC · JPL
235634	2004 RG_{52}	—	September 8, 2004	Socorro	LINEAR	MAS	970 m	MPC · JPL
235635	2004 RN_{65}	—	September 8, 2004	Socorro	LINEAR	V	880 m	MPC · JPL
235636	2004 RB_{68}	—	September 8, 2004	Socorro	LINEAR	V	790 m	MPC · JPL
235637	2004 RP_{70}	—	September 8, 2004	Socorro	LINEAR	·	1.3 km	MPC · JPL
235638	2004 RJ_{74}	—	September 8, 2004	Socorro	LINEAR	V	950 m	MPC · JPL
235639	2004 RR_{75}	—	September 8, 2004	Socorro	LINEAR	·	1.2 km	MPC · JPL
235640	2004 RS_{81}	—	September 8, 2004	Socorro	LINEAR	·	1.1 km	MPC · JPL
235641	2004 RL_{90}	—	September 8, 2004	Socorro	LINEAR	V	870 m	MPC · JPL
235642	2004 RM_{91}	—	September 8, 2004	Socorro	LINEAR	·	2.0 km	MPC · JPL
235643	2004 RP_{98}	—	September 8, 2004	Socorro	LINEAR	V	890 m	MPC · JPL
235644	2004 RO_{99}	—	September 8, 2004	Socorro	LINEAR	·	930 m	MPC · JPL
235645	2004 RE_{106}	—	September 8, 2004	Palomar	NEAT	·	1.4 km	MPC · JPL
235646	2004 RD_{112}	—	September 6, 2004	Palomar	NEAT	·	1.1 km	MPC · JPL
235647	2004 RH_{118}	—	September 7, 2004	Kitt Peak	Spacewatch	(2076)	1.3 km	MPC · JPL
235648	2004 RA_{147}	—	September 9, 2004	Socorro	LINEAR	·	1.8 km	MPC · JPL
235649	2004 RK_{148}	—	September 9, 2004	Socorro	LINEAR	NYS ·	1.7 km	MPC · JPL
235650	2004 RP_{148}	—	September 9, 2004	Socorro	LINEAR	·	1.9 km	MPC · JPL
235651	2004 RB_{149}	—	September 9, 2004	Socorro	LINEAR	·	1.4 km	MPC · JPL
235652	2004 RW_{150}	—	September 9, 2004	Socorro	LINEAR	·	1.8 km	MPC · JPL
235653	2004 RC_{155}	—	September 10, 2004	Socorro	LINEAR	(2076)	980 m	MPC · JPL
235654	2004 RO_{157}	—	September 10, 2004	Socorro	LINEAR	·	1.8 km	MPC · JPL
235655	2004 RR_{169}	—	September 8, 2004	Socorro	LINEAR	·	2.0 km	MPC · JPL
235656	2004 RB_{171}	—	September 9, 2004	Socorro	LINEAR	V	930 m	MPC · JPL
235657	2004 RJ_{172}	—	September 9, 2004	Socorro	LINEAR	·	2.1 km	MPC · JPL
235658	2004 RC_{180}	—	September 10, 2004	Socorro	LINEAR	·	960 m	MPC · JPL
235659	2004 RE_{181}	—	September 10, 2004	Socorro	LINEAR	·	1.9 km	MPC · JPL
235660	2004 RH_{191}	—	September 10, 2004	Socorro	LINEAR	·	1.3 km	MPC · JPL
235661	2004 RB_{221}	—	September 11, 2004	Socorro	LINEAR	EUN	2.2 km	MPC · JPL
235662	2004 RZ_{227}	—	September 9, 2004	Kitt Peak	Spacewatch	·	1.7 km	MPC · JPL
235663	2004 RG_{228}	—	September 9, 2004	Kitt Peak	Spacewatch	·	1.6 km	MPC · JPL
235664	2004 RY_{229}	—	September 9, 2004	Kitt Peak	Spacewatch	NYS	1.3 km	MPC · JPL
235665	2004 RJ_{230}	—	September 9, 2004	Kitt Peak	Spacewatch	·	920 m	MPC · JPL
235666	2004 RW_{231}	—	September 9, 2004	Kitt Peak	Spacewatch	·	2.1 km	MPC · JPL
235667	2004 RH_{239}	—	September 10, 2004	Kitt Peak	Spacewatch	V	820 m	MPC · JPL
235668	2004 RB_{244}	—	September 10, 2004	Kitt Peak	Spacewatch	V	720 m	MPC · JPL
235669	2004 RT_{245}	—	September 10, 2004	Kitt Peak	Spacewatch	·	1.9 km	MPC · JPL
235670	2004 RP_{250}	—	September 13, 2004	Palomar	NEAT	PHO	2.9 km	MPC · JPL
235671	2004 RU_{253}	—	September 6, 2004	Palomar	NEAT	·	2.2 km	MPC · JPL
235672	2004 RR_{259}	—	September 10, 2004	Kitt Peak	Spacewatch	·	1.2 km	MPC · JPL
235673	2004 RO_{264}	—	September 10, 2004	Kitt Peak	Spacewatch	·	770 m	MPC · JPL
235674	2004 RR_{279}	—	September 15, 2004	Kitt Peak	Spacewatch	NYS	1.2 km	MPC · JPL
235675	2004 RA_{282}	—	September 15, 2004	Kitt Peak	Spacewatch	·	1.1 km	MPC · JPL
235676	2004 RZ_{287}	—	September 15, 2004	7300	W. K. Y. Yeung	·	3.5 km	MPC · JPL
235677	2004 RN_{305}	—	September 12, 2004	Socorro	LINEAR	NYS	1.5 km	MPC · JPL
235678	2004 RY_{312}	—	September 15, 2004	Kitt Peak	Spacewatch	NYS	1.4 km	MPC · JPL
235679	2004 RL_{313}	—	September 15, 2004	Kitt Peak	Spacewatch	NYS	1.1 km	MPC · JPL
235680	2004 RD_{316}	—	September 8, 2004	Bergisch Gladbach	W. Bickel	NYS	1.3 km	MPC · JPL
235681	2004 RF_{333}	—	September 15, 2004	Anderson Mesa	LONEOS	·	1.8 km	MPC · JPL
235682	2004 RM_{333}	—	September 15, 2004	Anderson Mesa	LONEOS	·	1.2 km	MPC · JPL
235683	2004 RT_{336}	—	September 15, 2004	Kitt Peak	Spacewatch	(5)	1.1 km	MPC · JPL
235684	2004 RO_{337}	—	September 15, 2004	Kitt Peak	Spacewatch	(5)	1.5 km	MPC · JPL
235685	2004 SR_{12}	—	September 17, 2004	Socorro	LINEAR	·	1.9 km	MPC · JPL
235686	2004 SG_{13}	—	September 17, 2004	Anderson Mesa	LONEOS	·	950 m	MPC · JPL
235687	2004 SU_{15}	—	September 17, 2004	Anderson Mesa	LONEOS	·	1.7 km	MPC · JPL
235688	2004 SM_{17}	—	September 17, 2004	Anderson Mesa	LONEOS	·	3.0 km	MPC · JPL
235689	2004 SL_{20}	—	September 17, 2004	Desert Eagle	W. K. Y. Yeung	·	5.0 km	MPC · JPL
235690	2004 SR_{22}	—	September 17, 2004	Anderson Mesa	LONEOS	·	1.9 km	MPC · JPL
235691	2004 SE_{24}	—	September 17, 2004	Kitt Peak	Spacewatch	MAS	1.0 km	MPC · JPL
235692	2004 SP_{25}	—	September 20, 2004	Goodricke-Pigott	R. A. Tucker	·	1.8 km	MPC · JPL
235693	2004 SL_{31}	—	September 17, 2004	Socorro	LINEAR	V	1.1 km	MPC · JPL
235694	2004 SB_{32}	—	September 17, 2004	Socorro	LINEAR	V	1.1 km	MPC · JPL
235695	2004 SR_{32}	—	September 17, 2004	Socorro	LINEAR	NYS	1.6 km	MPC · JPL
235696	2004 SO_{39}	—	September 17, 2004	Socorro	LINEAR	·	1.7 km	MPC · JPL
235697	2004 SP_{51}	—	September 17, 2004	Socorro	LINEAR	NYS	1.3 km	MPC · JPL
235698	2004 TY_{4}	—	October 4, 2004	Kitt Peak	Spacewatch	·	3.2 km	MPC · JPL
235699	2004 TP_{5}	—	October 5, 2004	Kitt Peak	Spacewatch	·	1.4 km	MPC · JPL
235700	2004 TR_{13}	—	October 10, 2004	Haleakala	NEAT	APO	690 m	MPC · JPL

== 235701–235800 ==
back to top

Designation			Discovery			Properties		Ref
Permanent	Provisional	Named after	Date	Site	Discoverer(s)	Category	Diam.	Ref
235701	2004 TO_{32}	—	October 4, 2004	Kitt Peak	Spacewatch	·	1.0 km	MPC · JPL
235702	2004 TB_{44}	—	October 4, 2004	Kitt Peak	Spacewatch	(5)	1.5 km	MPC · JPL
235703	2004 TC_{45}	—	October 4, 2004	Kitt Peak	Spacewatch	·	960 m	MPC · JPL
235704	2004 TN_{48}	—	October 4, 2004	Kitt Peak	Spacewatch	·	2.1 km	MPC · JPL
235705	2004 TT_{49}	—	October 4, 2004	Kitt Peak	Spacewatch	(194)	4.2 km	MPC · JPL
235706	2004 TW_{50}	—	October 4, 2004	Kitt Peak	Spacewatch	·	1.2 km	MPC · JPL
235707	2004 TE_{55}	—	October 4, 2004	Kitt Peak	Spacewatch	·	1.8 km	MPC · JPL
235708	2004 TD_{56}	—	October 4, 2004	Kitt Peak	Spacewatch	·	1.8 km	MPC · JPL
235709	2004 TV_{59}	—	October 5, 2004	Kitt Peak	Spacewatch	·	2.7 km	MPC · JPL
235710	2004 TQ_{66}	—	October 5, 2004	Anderson Mesa	LONEOS	·	1.8 km	MPC · JPL
235711	2004 TL_{69}	—	October 5, 2004	Anderson Mesa	LONEOS	·	2.2 km	MPC · JPL
235712	2004 TH_{96}	—	October 5, 2004	Kitt Peak	Spacewatch	PAD	3.1 km	MPC · JPL
235713	2004 TZ_{102}	—	October 6, 2004	Palomar	NEAT	·	2.3 km	MPC · JPL
235714	2004 TD_{112}	—	October 7, 2004	Palomar	NEAT	·	5.7 km	MPC · JPL
235715	2004 TG_{122}	—	October 7, 2004	Anderson Mesa	LONEOS	·	1.9 km	MPC · JPL
235716	2004 TK_{124}	—	October 7, 2004	Socorro	LINEAR	·	1.8 km	MPC · JPL
235717	2004 TQ_{127}	—	October 7, 2004	Socorro	LINEAR	·	970 m	MPC · JPL
235718	2004 TH_{129}	—	October 7, 2004	Socorro	LINEAR	·	2.5 km	MPC · JPL
235719	2004 TJ_{142}	—	October 4, 2004	Kitt Peak	Spacewatch	CLA	2.6 km	MPC · JPL
235720	2004 TS_{160}	—	October 6, 2004	Kitt Peak	Spacewatch	·	1.9 km	MPC · JPL
235721	2004 TH_{161}	—	October 6, 2004	Kitt Peak	Spacewatch	·	2.2 km	MPC · JPL
235722	2004 TJ_{164}	—	October 6, 2004	Kitt Peak	Spacewatch	·	1.6 km	MPC · JPL
235723	2004 TT_{168}	—	October 7, 2004	Socorro	LINEAR	NYS	1.8 km	MPC · JPL
235724	2004 TR_{169}	—	October 7, 2004	Socorro	LINEAR	·	1.6 km	MPC · JPL
235725	2004 TF_{170}	—	October 7, 2004	Socorro	LINEAR	·	2.2 km	MPC · JPL
235726	2004 TX_{171}	—	October 8, 2004	Socorro	LINEAR	·	2.0 km	MPC · JPL
235727	2004 TL_{175}	—	October 9, 2004	Socorro	LINEAR	·	1.2 km	MPC · JPL
235728	2004 TB_{188}	—	October 7, 2004	Kitt Peak	Spacewatch	·	1.2 km	MPC · JPL
235729	2004 TQ_{205}	—	October 7, 2004	Kitt Peak	Spacewatch	·	2.9 km	MPC · JPL
235730	2004 TY_{206}	—	October 7, 2004	Kitt Peak	Spacewatch	·	1.5 km	MPC · JPL
235731	2004 TK_{220}	—	October 6, 2004	Socorro	LINEAR	PHO	1.3 km	MPC · JPL
235732	2004 TC_{229}	—	October 8, 2004	Kitt Peak	Spacewatch	·	1.4 km	MPC · JPL
235733	2004 TR_{237}	—	October 9, 2004	Socorro	LINEAR	·	1.8 km	MPC · JPL
235734	2004 TJ_{244}	—	October 7, 2004	Kitt Peak	Spacewatch	V	1.2 km	MPC · JPL
235735	2004 TU_{244}	—	October 7, 2004	Kitt Peak	Spacewatch	·	1.3 km	MPC · JPL
235736	2004 TP_{250}	—	October 8, 2004	Palomar	NEAT	·	3.8 km	MPC · JPL
235737	2004 TH_{264}	—	October 9, 2004	Kitt Peak	Spacewatch	MAS	940 m	MPC · JPL
235738	2004 TC_{265}	—	October 9, 2004	Kitt Peak	Spacewatch	·	1.4 km	MPC · JPL
235739	2004 TF_{277}	—	October 9, 2004	Kitt Peak	Spacewatch	·	1.5 km	MPC · JPL
235740	2004 TO_{283}	—	October 8, 2004	Kitt Peak	Spacewatch	V	1.0 km	MPC · JPL
235741	2004 TH_{286}	—	October 8, 2004	Kitt Peak	Spacewatch	(5)	1.4 km	MPC · JPL
235742	2004 TH_{297}	—	October 11, 2004	Palomar	NEAT	·	1.9 km	MPC · JPL
235743	2004 TU_{303}	—	October 10, 2004	Kitt Peak	Spacewatch	·	1.8 km	MPC · JPL
235744	2004 TW_{306}	—	October 10, 2004	Socorro	LINEAR	·	3.5 km	MPC · JPL
235745	2004 TS_{308}	—	October 10, 2004	Kitt Peak	Spacewatch	NEM	2.6 km	MPC · JPL
235746	2004 TC_{312}	—	October 11, 2004	Kitt Peak	Spacewatch	·	2.0 km	MPC · JPL
235747	2004 TY_{332}	—	October 9, 2004	Kitt Peak	Spacewatch	·	1.2 km	MPC · JPL
235748	2004 TQ_{340}	—	October 13, 2004	Anderson Mesa	LONEOS	·	2.3 km	MPC · JPL
235749	2004 TT_{348}	—	October 7, 2004	Kitt Peak	Spacewatch	MAS	1.1 km	MPC · JPL
235750 Leahroberson	2004 TU_{353}	Leahroberson	October 11, 2004	Kitt Peak	M. W. Buie	·	1.4 km	MPC · JPL
235751	2004 TM_{366}	—	October 15, 2004	Kitt Peak	Spacewatch	·	2.7 km	MPC · JPL
235752	2004 TN_{366}	—	October 4, 2004	Kitt Peak	Spacewatch	·	2.4 km	MPC · JPL
235753	2004 UZ_{2}	—	October 18, 2004	Socorro	LINEAR	·	1.7 km	MPC · JPL
235754	2004 UP_{3}	—	October 19, 2004	Socorro	LINEAR	(5)	1.6 km	MPC · JPL
235755	2004 US_{8}	—	October 21, 2004	Socorro	LINEAR	·	3.2 km	MPC · JPL
235756	2004 VC	—	November 1, 2004	Siding Spring	SSS	APO +1km · PHA	1.1 km	MPC · JPL
235757	2004 VN_{2}	—	November 3, 2004	Kitt Peak	Spacewatch	·	1.3 km	MPC · JPL
235758	2004 VX_{3}	—	November 3, 2004	Kitt Peak	Spacewatch	·	4.1 km	MPC · JPL
235759	2004 VY_{3}	—	November 3, 2004	Kitt Peak	Spacewatch	·	1.8 km	MPC · JPL
235760	2004 VE_{5}	—	November 3, 2004	Anderson Mesa	LONEOS	(5)	1.5 km	MPC · JPL
235761	2004 VL_{7}	—	November 3, 2004	Kitt Peak	Spacewatch	·	2.4 km	MPC · JPL
235762	2004 VP_{7}	—	November 3, 2004	Kitt Peak	Spacewatch	MIS	3.2 km	MPC · JPL
235763	2004 VS_{8}	—	November 3, 2004	Anderson Mesa	LONEOS	·	1.5 km	MPC · JPL
235764	2004 VN_{11}	—	November 3, 2004	Palomar	NEAT	·	1.2 km	MPC · JPL
235765	2004 VW_{11}	—	November 3, 2004	Catalina	CSS	BRG	1.9 km	MPC · JPL
235766	2004 VV_{15}	—	November 1, 2004	Palomar	NEAT	·	2.8 km	MPC · JPL
235767	2004 VK_{17}	—	November 3, 2004	Kitt Peak	Spacewatch	·	1.3 km	MPC · JPL
235768	2004 VV_{20}	—	November 4, 2004	Catalina	CSS	·	1.9 km	MPC · JPL
235769	2004 VJ_{21}	—	November 4, 2004	Catalina	CSS	·	3.2 km	MPC · JPL
235770	2004 VX_{22}	—	November 4, 2004	Catalina	CSS	·	1.9 km	MPC · JPL
235771	2004 VC_{23}	—	November 5, 2004	Campo Imperatore	CINEOS	·	2.1 km	MPC · JPL
235772	2004 VZ_{23}	—	November 4, 2004	Anderson Mesa	LONEOS	·	1.8 km	MPC · JPL
235773	2004 VD_{24}	—	November 5, 2004	Anderson Mesa	LONEOS	RAF	1.6 km	MPC · JPL
235774	2004 VS_{29}	—	November 3, 2004	Kitt Peak	Spacewatch	(5)	1.4 km	MPC · JPL
235775	2004 VZ_{31}	—	November 3, 2004	Kitt Peak	Spacewatch	NYS	1.5 km	MPC · JPL
235776	2004 VR_{42}	—	November 4, 2004	Kitt Peak	Spacewatch	·	3.0 km	MPC · JPL
235777	2004 VU_{47}	—	November 4, 2004	Kitt Peak	Spacewatch	(5)	1.6 km	MPC · JPL
235778	2004 VA_{74}	—	November 12, 2004	Catalina	CSS	·	3.1 km	MPC · JPL
235779	2004 VO_{75}	—	November 4, 2004	Socorro	LINEAR	·	1.7 km	MPC · JPL
235780	2004 VJ_{86}	—	November 10, 2004	Kitt Peak	Spacewatch	·	1.3 km	MPC · JPL
235781	2004 VT_{88}	—	November 11, 2004	Kitt Peak	Spacewatch	(5)	1.6 km	MPC · JPL
235782	2004 WH_{5}	—	November 19, 2004	Socorro	LINEAR	·	3.1 km	MPC · JPL
235783	2004 WT_{7}	—	November 19, 2004	Catalina	CSS	(5)	1.7 km	MPC · JPL
235784	2004 WU_{9}	—	November 30, 2004	Palomar	NEAT	·	3.7 km	MPC · JPL
235785	2004 WV_{10}	—	November 19, 2004	Kitt Peak	Spacewatch	·	1.8 km	MPC · JPL
235786	2004 XB_{2}	—	December 1, 2004	Catalina	CSS	·	2.6 km	MPC · JPL
235787	2004 XZ_{2}	—	December 2, 2004	Catalina	CSS	(32418)	3.1 km	MPC · JPL
235788	2004 XP_{6}	—	December 2, 2004	Kitt Peak	Spacewatch	·	3.7 km	MPC · JPL
235789	2004 XY_{9}	—	December 2, 2004	Catalina	CSS	·	2.6 km	MPC · JPL
235790	2004 XS_{11}	—	December 7, 2004	Socorro	LINEAR	JUN	1.3 km	MPC · JPL
235791	2004 XP_{12}	—	December 8, 2004	Socorro	LINEAR	·	4.2 km	MPC · JPL
235792	2004 XS_{12}	—	December 8, 2004	Socorro	LINEAR	·	2.5 km	MPC · JPL
235793	2004 XZ_{13}	—	December 9, 2004	Catalina	CSS	MRX	1.3 km	MPC · JPL
235794	2004 XD_{14}	—	December 9, 2004	Kitt Peak	Spacewatch	·	2.5 km	MPC · JPL
235795	2004 XP_{18}	—	December 8, 2004	Socorro	LINEAR	·	1.8 km	MPC · JPL
235796	2004 XH_{19}	—	December 8, 2004	Socorro	LINEAR	EUN	1.9 km	MPC · JPL
235797	2004 XS_{22}	—	December 8, 2004	Socorro	LINEAR	(29841)	1.9 km	MPC · JPL
235798	2004 XJ_{23}	—	December 8, 2004	Socorro	LINEAR	·	2.5 km	MPC · JPL
235799	2004 XN_{23}	—	December 8, 2004	Socorro	LINEAR	·	3.8 km	MPC · JPL
235800	2004 XX_{24}	—	December 9, 2004	Kitt Peak	Spacewatch	·	2.4 km	MPC · JPL

== 235801–235900 ==
back to top

Designation			Discovery			Properties		Ref
Permanent	Provisional	Named after	Date	Site	Discoverer(s)	Category	Diam.	Ref
235801	2004 XT_{25}	—	December 9, 2004	Catalina	CSS	DOR	3.7 km	MPC · JPL
235802	2004 XY_{33}	—	December 11, 2004	Campo Imperatore	CINEOS	PHO	3.7 km	MPC · JPL
235803	2004 XE_{39}	—	December 7, 2004	Socorro	LINEAR	EUN	1.6 km	MPC · JPL
235804	2004 XE_{43}	—	December 10, 2004	Socorro	LINEAR	(5)	1.7 km	MPC · JPL
235805	2004 XH_{43}	—	December 10, 2004	Socorro	LINEAR	·	3.9 km	MPC · JPL
235806	2004 XP_{44}	—	December 2, 2004	Catalina	CSS	·	1.6 km	MPC · JPL
235807	2004 XH_{46}	—	December 9, 2004	Kitt Peak	Spacewatch	·	1.7 km	MPC · JPL
235808	2004 XY_{55}	—	December 10, 2004	Kitt Peak	Spacewatch	·	2.0 km	MPC · JPL
235809	2004 XJ_{58}	—	December 10, 2004	Kitt Peak	Spacewatch	MRX	1.1 km	MPC · JPL
235810	2004 XK_{58}	—	December 10, 2004	Kitt Peak	Spacewatch	NEM	2.9 km	MPC · JPL
235811	2004 XT_{58}	—	December 10, 2004	Kitt Peak	Spacewatch	·	3.8 km	MPC · JPL
235812	2004 XW_{60}	—	December 12, 2004	Kitt Peak	Spacewatch	·	2.3 km	MPC · JPL
235813	2004 XA_{66}	—	December 2, 2004	Kitt Peak	Spacewatch	(5)	1.9 km	MPC · JPL
235814	2004 XZ_{75}	—	December 10, 2004	Kitt Peak	Spacewatch	·	2.0 km	MPC · JPL
235815	2004 XS_{82}	—	December 11, 2004	Kitt Peak	Spacewatch	·	1.8 km	MPC · JPL
235816	2004 XB_{85}	—	December 12, 2004	Kitt Peak	Spacewatch	·	2.3 km	MPC · JPL
235817	2004 XN_{86}	—	December 13, 2004	Kitt Peak	Spacewatch	·	4.9 km	MPC · JPL
235818	2004 XB_{89}	—	December 10, 2004	Campo Imperatore	CINEOS	KON	4.0 km	MPC · JPL
235819	2004 XA_{92}	—	December 11, 2004	Kitt Peak	Spacewatch	·	2.5 km	MPC · JPL
235820	2004 XP_{92}	—	December 11, 2004	Socorro	LINEAR	·	2.5 km	MPC · JPL
235821	2004 XD_{97}	—	December 11, 2004	Kitt Peak	Spacewatch	·	5.8 km	MPC · JPL
235822	2004 XJ_{102}	—	December 11, 2004	Catalina	CSS	·	3.2 km	MPC · JPL
235823	2004 XH_{111}	—	December 14, 2004	Catalina	CSS	(5)	2.1 km	MPC · JPL
235824	2004 XL_{124}	—	December 10, 2004	Socorro	LINEAR	·	3.7 km	MPC · JPL
235825	2004 XK_{127}	—	December 14, 2004	Socorro	LINEAR	·	1.4 km	MPC · JPL
235826	2004 XU_{130}	—	December 14, 2004	Catalina	CSS	HNS	2.0 km	MPC · JPL
235827	2004 XL_{137}	—	December 15, 2004	Socorro	LINEAR	·	3.0 km	MPC · JPL
235828	2004 XZ_{141}	—	December 14, 2004	Kitt Peak	Spacewatch	·	1.9 km	MPC · JPL
235829	2004 XE_{144}	—	December 12, 2004	Socorro	LINEAR	·	2.7 km	MPC · JPL
235830	2004 XB_{152}	—	December 15, 2004	Kitt Peak	Spacewatch	·	1.5 km	MPC · JPL
235831	2004 XR_{160}	—	December 14, 2004	Kitt Peak	Spacewatch	·	3.2 km	MPC · JPL
235832	2004 XQ_{163}	—	December 15, 2004	Kitt Peak	Spacewatch	VER	5.0 km	MPC · JPL
235833	2004 XS_{164}	—	December 1, 2004	Socorro	LINEAR	·	2.8 km	MPC · JPL
235834	2004 XX_{164}	—	December 1, 2004	Palomar	NEAT	·	2.1 km	MPC · JPL
235835	2004 XH_{184}	—	December 10, 2004	Kitt Peak	Spacewatch	·	1.8 km	MPC · JPL
235836	2004 XP_{191}	—	December 11, 2004	Kitt Peak	Spacewatch	·	3.1 km	MPC · JPL
235837 Iota	2004 YP_{1}	Iota	December 19, 2004	Needville	J. Dellinger	·	4.9 km	MPC · JPL
235838	2004 YF_{2}	—	December 16, 2004	Kitt Peak	Spacewatch	·	2.2 km	MPC · JPL
235839	2004 YH_{11}	—	December 18, 2004	Mount Lemmon	Mount Lemmon Survey	·	1.9 km	MPC · JPL
235840	2004 YP_{11}	—	December 18, 2004	Mount Lemmon	Mount Lemmon Survey	·	2.8 km	MPC · JPL
235841	2004 YC_{12}	—	December 18, 2004	Mount Lemmon	Mount Lemmon Survey	NEM	2.6 km	MPC · JPL
235842	2004 YU_{23}	—	December 18, 2004	Mount Lemmon	Mount Lemmon Survey	EOS	6.1 km	MPC · JPL
235843	2004 YD_{36}	—	December 19, 2004	Mount Lemmon	Mount Lemmon Survey	(11882)	2.1 km	MPC · JPL
235844	2004 YH_{36}	—	December 20, 2004	Mount Lemmon	Mount Lemmon Survey	·	2.3 km	MPC · JPL
235845	2005 AL_{1}	—	January 1, 2005	Catalina	CSS	EUN	1.8 km	MPC · JPL
235846	2005 AY_{6}	—	January 6, 2005	Catalina	CSS	·	3.3 km	MPC · JPL
235847	2005 AX_{7}	—	January 6, 2005	Catalina	CSS	·	2.5 km	MPC · JPL
235848	2005 AC_{8}	—	January 6, 2005	Catalina	CSS	·	3.1 km	MPC · JPL
235849	2005 AE_{15}	—	January 7, 2005	Socorro	LINEAR	·	1.8 km	MPC · JPL
235850	2005 AN_{16}	—	January 6, 2005	Socorro	LINEAR	·	3.0 km	MPC · JPL
235851	2005 AF_{25}	—	January 8, 2005	Campo Imperatore	CINEOS	·	1.7 km	MPC · JPL
235852 Theogeuens	2005 AX_{27}	Theogeuens	January 14, 2005	Uccle	E. W. Elst	·	2.6 km	MPC · JPL
235853	2005 AJ_{28}	—	January 13, 2005	Catalina	CSS	·	3.8 km	MPC · JPL
235854	2005 AQ_{29}	—	January 8, 2005	Socorro	LINEAR	·	3.3 km	MPC · JPL
235855	2005 AO_{30}	—	January 9, 2005	Catalina	CSS	·	4.0 km	MPC · JPL
235856	2005 AV_{33}	—	January 13, 2005	Kitt Peak	Spacewatch	·	5.2 km	MPC · JPL
235857	2005 AP_{35}	—	January 13, 2005	Socorro	LINEAR	·	2.4 km	MPC · JPL
235858	2005 AW_{37}	—	January 13, 2005	Kitt Peak	Spacewatch	·	2.2 km	MPC · JPL
235859	2005 AE_{39}	—	January 13, 2005	Kitt Peak	Spacewatch	MRX	1.6 km	MPC · JPL
235860	2005 AD_{42}	—	January 15, 2005	Catalina	CSS	·	3.7 km	MPC · JPL
235861	2005 AV_{42}	—	January 15, 2005	Socorro	LINEAR	·	2.2 km	MPC · JPL
235862	2005 AU_{44}	—	January 15, 2005	Kitt Peak	Spacewatch	·	3.0 km	MPC · JPL
235863	2005 AY_{53}	—	January 13, 2005	Kitt Peak	Spacewatch	·	6.5 km	MPC · JPL
235864	2005 AR_{57}	—	January 15, 2005	Catalina	CSS	·	3.0 km	MPC · JPL
235865	2005 AM_{58}	—	January 15, 2005	Socorro	LINEAR	·	2.7 km	MPC · JPL
235866	2005 AC_{61}	—	January 15, 2005	Kitt Peak	Spacewatch	ADE	4.1 km	MPC · JPL
235867	2005 AS_{77}	—	January 15, 2005	Kitt Peak	Spacewatch	·	4.9 km	MPC · JPL
235868	2005 AP_{80}	—	January 15, 2005	Kitt Peak	Spacewatch	·	4.8 km	MPC · JPL
235869	2005 AH_{82}	—	January 13, 2005	Kitt Peak	Spacewatch	·	2.5 km	MPC · JPL
235870	2005 BY_{6}	—	January 16, 2005	Socorro	LINEAR	·	2.5 km	MPC · JPL
235871	2005 BA_{10}	—	January 16, 2005	Socorro	LINEAR	·	3.4 km	MPC · JPL
235872	2005 BZ_{10}	—	January 16, 2005	Kitt Peak	Spacewatch	·	3.1 km	MPC · JPL
235873	2005 BA_{13}	—	January 17, 2005	Socorro	LINEAR	DOR	3.3 km	MPC · JPL
235874	2005 BZ_{14}	—	January 16, 2005	Kitt Peak	Spacewatch	(13314)	4.1 km	MPC · JPL
235875	2005 BK_{16}	—	January 16, 2005	Socorro	LINEAR	·	3.0 km	MPC · JPL
235876	2005 BQ_{25}	—	January 18, 2005	Catalina	CSS	·	6.8 km	MPC · JPL
235877	2005 BW_{27}	—	January 19, 2005	Kitt Peak	Spacewatch	(11882)	2.4 km	MPC · JPL
235878	2005 BR_{29}	—	January 31, 2005	Socorro	LINEAR	·	4.7 km	MPC · JPL
235879	2005 BX_{34}	—	January 16, 2005	Mauna Kea	Veillet, C.	·	3.6 km	MPC · JPL
235880	2005 BM_{48}	—	January 19, 2005	Kitt Peak	Spacewatch	AGN	1.9 km	MPC · JPL
235881	2005 CL_{2}	—	February 1, 2005	Catalina	CSS	·	2.5 km	MPC · JPL
235882	2005 CM_{5}	—	February 1, 2005	Kitt Peak	Spacewatch	·	2.4 km	MPC · JPL
235883	2005 CV_{8}	—	February 1, 2005	Catalina	CSS	(13314)	3.5 km	MPC · JPL
235884	2005 CC_{9}	—	February 1, 2005	Catalina	CSS	·	3.7 km	MPC · JPL
235885	2005 CK_{10}	—	February 1, 2005	Kitt Peak	Spacewatch	·	3.1 km	MPC · JPL
235886	2005 CR_{23}	—	February 2, 2005	Socorro	LINEAR	·	9.0 km	MPC · JPL
235887	2005 CB_{30}	—	February 1, 2005	Kitt Peak	Spacewatch	·	5.6 km	MPC · JPL
235888	2005 CM_{36}	—	February 3, 2005	Socorro	LINEAR	·	1.9 km	MPC · JPL
235889	2005 CU_{43}	—	February 2, 2005	Catalina	CSS	·	2.6 km	MPC · JPL
235890	2005 CG_{45}	—	February 2, 2005	Catalina	CSS	·	3.4 km	MPC · JPL
235891	2005 CA_{49}	—	February 2, 2005	Catalina	CSS	·	2.3 km	MPC · JPL
235892	2005 CB_{57}	—	February 2, 2005	Catalina	CSS	·	4.9 km	MPC · JPL
235893	2005 CJ_{59}	—	February 2, 2005	Palomar	NEAT	·	4.0 km	MPC · JPL
235894	2005 CD_{62}	—	February 14, 2005	Mayhill	Lowe, A.	·	4.7 km	MPC · JPL
235895	2005 CR_{63}	—	February 9, 2005	Anderson Mesa	LONEOS	(13314)	2.9 km	MPC · JPL
235896	2005 CZ_{63}	—	February 9, 2005	Anderson Mesa	LONEOS	·	4.5 km	MPC · JPL
235897	2005 CW_{68}	—	February 4, 2005	Anderson Mesa	LONEOS	·	3.5 km	MPC · JPL
235898	2005 CL_{69}	—	February 14, 2005	Kitt Peak	Spacewatch	HOF	4.0 km	MPC · JPL
235899	2005 CY_{73}	—	February 1, 2005	Kitt Peak	Spacewatch	KOR	1.4 km	MPC · JPL
235900	2005 CY_{75}	—	February 2, 2005	Catalina	CSS	DOR	3.4 km	MPC · JPL

== 235901–236000 ==
back to top

Designation			Discovery			Properties		Ref
Permanent	Provisional	Named after	Date	Site	Discoverer(s)	Category	Diam.	Ref
235901	2005 CV_{80}	—	February 1, 2005	Catalina	CSS	·	2.4 km	MPC · JPL
235902	2005 DC	—	February 16, 2005	Sandlot	G. Hug	TIR	2.4 km	MPC · JPL
235903	2005 EG	—	March 1, 2005	Socorro	LINEAR	·	5.6 km	MPC · JPL
235904	2005 EZ_{3}	—	March 1, 2005	Kitt Peak	Spacewatch	·	2.5 km	MPC · JPL
235905	2005 EV_{9}	—	March 2, 2005	Kitt Peak	Spacewatch	·	3.1 km	MPC · JPL
235906	2005 EH_{17}	—	March 3, 2005	Kitt Peak	Spacewatch	·	2.8 km	MPC · JPL
235907	2005 EJ_{19}	—	March 3, 2005	Kitt Peak	Spacewatch	·	1.9 km	MPC · JPL
235908	2005 EY_{22}	—	March 3, 2005	Catalina	CSS	·	2.9 km	MPC · JPL
235909	2005 EA_{25}	—	March 3, 2005	Catalina	CSS	·	3.5 km	MPC · JPL
235910	2005 EO_{25}	—	March 3, 2005	Junk Bond	Junk Bond	KOR	1.7 km	MPC · JPL
235911	2005 EM_{34}	—	March 3, 2005	Catalina	CSS	·	3.8 km	MPC · JPL
235912	2005 EL_{36}	—	March 4, 2005	Catalina	CSS	·	6.8 km	MPC · JPL
235913	2005 EU_{39}	—	March 1, 2005	Kitt Peak	Spacewatch	NEM	2.5 km	MPC · JPL
235914	2005 EL_{43}	—	March 3, 2005	Kitt Peak	Spacewatch	·	2.9 km	MPC · JPL
235915	2005 EO_{44}	—	March 3, 2005	Kitt Peak	Spacewatch	EOS	3.6 km	MPC · JPL
235916	2005 EF_{45}	—	March 3, 2005	Catalina	CSS	HYG	4.9 km	MPC · JPL
235917	2005 EW_{45}	—	March 3, 2005	Catalina	CSS	·	3.2 km	MPC · JPL
235918	2005 EH_{49}	—	March 3, 2005	Catalina	CSS	·	3.8 km	MPC · JPL
235919	2005 EV_{51}	—	March 3, 2005	Catalina	CSS	EUP	6.0 km	MPC · JPL
235920	2005 EY_{54}	—	March 4, 2005	Kitt Peak	Spacewatch	·	3.8 km	MPC · JPL
235921	2005 EN_{58}	—	March 4, 2005	Kitt Peak	Spacewatch	·	5.7 km	MPC · JPL
235922	2005 ET_{67}	—	March 4, 2005	Mount Lemmon	Mount Lemmon Survey	URS	6.5 km	MPC · JPL
235923	2005 EZ_{71}	—	March 2, 2005	Anderson Mesa	LONEOS	·	2.9 km	MPC · JPL
235924	2005 EF_{84}	—	March 4, 2005	Catalina	CSS	·	4.8 km	MPC · JPL
235925	2005 EA_{96}	—	March 3, 2005	Catalina	CSS	·	2.8 km	MPC · JPL
235926	2005 EL_{97}	—	March 3, 2005	Catalina	CSS	·	6.3 km	MPC · JPL
235927	2005 EL_{100}	—	March 3, 2005	Catalina	CSS	·	2.8 km	MPC · JPL
235928	2005 EO_{101}	—	March 3, 2005	Catalina	CSS	·	3.0 km	MPC · JPL
235929	2005 EX_{101}	—	March 3, 2005	Kitt Peak	Spacewatch	·	6.2 km	MPC · JPL
235930	2005 EO_{104}	—	March 4, 2005	Mount Lemmon	Mount Lemmon Survey	HOF	3.4 km	MPC · JPL
235931	2005 EU_{113}	—	March 4, 2005	Catalina	CSS	·	4.0 km	MPC · JPL
235932	2005 EE_{116}	—	March 4, 2005	Mount Lemmon	Mount Lemmon Survey	KOR	2.0 km	MPC · JPL
235933	2005 EP_{119}	—	March 7, 2005	Socorro	LINEAR	H	880 m	MPC · JPL
235934	2005 EA_{120}	—	March 8, 2005	Kitt Peak	Spacewatch	·	2.7 km	MPC · JPL
235935	2005 EO_{126}	—	March 8, 2005	Mount Lemmon	Mount Lemmon Survey	·	3.7 km	MPC · JPL
235936	2005 EJ_{127}	—	March 9, 2005	Kitt Peak	Spacewatch	KOR	1.6 km	MPC · JPL
235937	2005 EY_{132}	—	March 9, 2005	Catalina	CSS	·	6.6 km	MPC · JPL
235938	2005 EZ_{135}	—	March 9, 2005	Anderson Mesa	LONEOS	·	4.4 km	MPC · JPL
235939	2005 EC_{137}	—	March 9, 2005	Mount Lemmon	Mount Lemmon Survey	·	2.1 km	MPC · JPL
235940	2005 EA_{139}	—	March 9, 2005	Mount Lemmon	Mount Lemmon Survey	·	4.2 km	MPC · JPL
235941	2005 EP_{139}	—	March 9, 2005	Mount Lemmon	Mount Lemmon Survey	THM	3.0 km	MPC · JPL
235942	2005 EU_{139}	—	March 9, 2005	Mount Lemmon	Mount Lemmon Survey	·	3.3 km	MPC · JPL
235943	2005 EF_{141}	—	March 10, 2005	Catalina	CSS	·	2.6 km	MPC · JPL
235944	2005 EH_{143}	—	March 10, 2005	Catalina	CSS	·	4.4 km	MPC · JPL
235945	2005 EV_{143}	—	March 10, 2005	Mount Lemmon	Mount Lemmon Survey	KOR	2.0 km	MPC · JPL
235946	2005 EY_{145}	—	March 10, 2005	Mount Lemmon	Mount Lemmon Survey	·	2.9 km	MPC · JPL
235947	2005 ET_{147}	—	March 10, 2005	Kitt Peak	Spacewatch	·	2.5 km	MPC · JPL
235948	2005 EW_{156}	—	March 9, 2005	Socorro	LINEAR	·	4.1 km	MPC · JPL
235949	2005 EE_{159}	—	March 9, 2005	Mount Lemmon	Mount Lemmon Survey	KOR	1.6 km	MPC · JPL
235950	2005 EY_{159}	—	March 9, 2005	Mount Lemmon	Mount Lemmon Survey	·	2.5 km	MPC · JPL
235951	2005 EL_{160}	—	March 9, 2005	Mount Lemmon	Mount Lemmon Survey	·	3.1 km	MPC · JPL
235952	2005 EX_{165}	—	March 11, 2005	Kitt Peak	Spacewatch	·	5.2 km	MPC · JPL
235953	2005 EN_{176}	—	March 8, 2005	Socorro	LINEAR	DOR	2.6 km	MPC · JPL
235954	2005 EX_{180}	—	March 9, 2005	Mount Lemmon	Mount Lemmon Survey	NEM	2.4 km	MPC · JPL
235955	2005 EW_{183}	—	March 9, 2005	Mount Lemmon	Mount Lemmon Survey	KOR	1.5 km	MPC · JPL
235956	2005 ET_{188}	—	March 10, 2005	Mount Lemmon	Mount Lemmon Survey	·	2.9 km	MPC · JPL
235957	2005 EP_{194}	—	March 11, 2005	Mount Lemmon	Mount Lemmon Survey	·	2.0 km	MPC · JPL
235958	2005 ET_{194}	—	March 11, 2005	Mount Lemmon	Mount Lemmon Survey	·	2.8 km	MPC · JPL
235959	2005 EO_{203}	—	March 11, 2005	Kitt Peak	Spacewatch	·	2.4 km	MPC · JPL
235960	2005 EJ_{204}	—	March 11, 2005	Kitt Peak	Spacewatch	·	3.1 km	MPC · JPL
235961	2005 EX_{205}	—	March 13, 2005	Catalina	CSS	·	3.7 km	MPC · JPL
235962	2005 ER_{216}	—	March 8, 2005	Mount Lemmon	Mount Lemmon Survey	THM	2.6 km	MPC · JPL
235963	2005 EU_{216}	—	March 8, 2005	Socorro	LINEAR	H	870 m	MPC · JPL
235964	2005 EX_{217}	—	March 9, 2005	Mount Lemmon	Mount Lemmon Survey	EOS	2.5 km	MPC · JPL
235965	2005 EG_{218}	—	March 9, 2005	Kitt Peak	Spacewatch	·	3.7 km	MPC · JPL
235966	2005 EB_{220}	—	March 10, 2005	Siding Spring	SSS	·	4.1 km	MPC · JPL
235967	2005 EK_{221}	—	March 11, 2005	Mount Lemmon	Mount Lemmon Survey	·	3.4 km	MPC · JPL
235968	2005 EY_{236}	—	March 11, 2005	Kitt Peak	Spacewatch	·	2.0 km	MPC · JPL
235969	2005 EK_{239}	—	March 11, 2005	Kitt Peak	Spacewatch	·	2.4 km	MPC · JPL
235970	2005 EH_{240}	—	March 11, 2005	Kitt Peak	Spacewatch	·	3.9 km	MPC · JPL
235971	2005 EE_{248}	—	March 12, 2005	Kitt Peak	Spacewatch	THM	2.8 km	MPC · JPL
235972	2005 EH_{250}	—	March 14, 2005	Mount Lemmon	Mount Lemmon Survey	THB	4.4 km	MPC · JPL
235973	2005 EJ_{250}	—	March 15, 2005	Catalina	CSS	·	5.8 km	MPC · JPL
235974	2005 EL_{256}	—	March 11, 2005	Mount Lemmon	Mount Lemmon Survey	·	2.4 km	MPC · JPL
235975	2005 EX_{257}	—	March 11, 2005	Mount Lemmon	Mount Lemmon Survey	·	3.8 km	MPC · JPL
235976	2005 EA_{260}	—	March 11, 2005	Kitt Peak	Spacewatch	THM	3.4 km	MPC · JPL
235977	2005 ER_{260}	—	March 12, 2005	Kitt Peak	Spacewatch	·	2.9 km	MPC · JPL
235978	2005 ER_{262}	—	March 13, 2005	Kitt Peak	Spacewatch	·	2.5 km	MPC · JPL
235979	2005 EJ_{269}	—	March 15, 2005	Mount Lemmon	Mount Lemmon Survey	EUP	5.1 km	MPC · JPL
235980	2005 EA_{272}	—	March 10, 2005	Anderson Mesa	LONEOS	·	3.4 km	MPC · JPL
235981	2005 EM_{282}	—	March 10, 2005	Mount Lemmon	Mount Lemmon Survey	·	2.6 km	MPC · JPL
235982	2005 EE_{293}	—	March 10, 2005	Catalina	CSS	·	3.0 km	MPC · JPL
235983	2005 EH_{306}	—	March 4, 2005	Mount Lemmon	Mount Lemmon Survey	·	3.6 km	MPC · JPL
235984	2005 ET_{315}	—	March 11, 2005	Kitt Peak	Spacewatch	·	3.5 km	MPC · JPL
235985 Dougrodgers	2005 ER_{317}	Dougrodgers	March 12, 2005	Kitt Peak	M. W. Buie	·	2.1 km	MPC · JPL
235986	2005 EY_{326}	—	March 3, 2005	Kitt Peak	Spacewatch	KOR	2.1 km	MPC · JPL
235987	2005 ET_{327}	—	March 11, 2005	Mount Lemmon	Mount Lemmon Survey	·	3.5 km	MPC · JPL
235988	2005 EJ_{330}	—	March 2, 2005	Catalina	CSS	EOS	3.0 km	MPC · JPL
235989	2005 EO_{330}	—	March 15, 2005	Catalina	CSS	·	2.9 km	MPC · JPL
235990 Laennec	2005 FP_{2}	Laennec	March 16, 2005	Saint-Sulpice	B. Christophe	TIR	3.2 km	MPC · JPL
235991	2005 FD_{7}	—	March 31, 2005	Anderson Mesa	LONEOS	·	2.7 km	MPC · JPL
235992	2005 FC_{10}	—	March 17, 2005	Kitt Peak	Spacewatch	KOR	2.0 km	MPC · JPL
235993	2005 FQ_{12}	—	March 16, 2005	Catalina	CSS	EOS	3.1 km	MPC · JPL
235994	2005 GY_{1}	—	April 1, 2005	Catalina	CSS	EUP	5.2 km	MPC · JPL
235995	2005 GA_{9}	—	April 1, 2005	Kitt Peak	Spacewatch	EOS	6.0 km	MPC · JPL
235996	2005 GF_{9}	—	April 2, 2005	Bergisch Gladbach	W. Bickel	·	4.0 km	MPC · JPL
235997	2005 GQ_{18}	—	April 2, 2005	Goodricke-Pigott	R. A. Tucker	·	4.4 km	MPC · JPL
235998	2005 GZ_{21}	—	April 4, 2005	Catalina	CSS	·	5.1 km	MPC · JPL
235999 Bucciantini	2005 GA_{22}	Bucciantini	April 4, 2005	San Marcello	L. Tesi, Fagioli, G.	·	4.2 km	MPC · JPL
236000	2005 GK_{22}	—	April 4, 2005	Catalina	CSS	EOS	3.3 km	MPC · JPL

back to top

== See also ==
- Meanings of minor-planet names: 235001–236000
