= University of Niagara Falls Canada =

University in Niagara Falls, Ontario

- Type: Private, for-profit
- Established: 2024
- President: David Gray
- Location: Niagara Falls, Ontario, Canada
- Campus: Urban
- Owner: Global University Systems
- Colours: Navy blue, royal blue, white
- Website: unfc.ca

The University of Niagara Falls Canada (UNF) is a private, for-profit university in downtown Niagara Falls, Ontario, Canada. The university was established in 2024 after its announcement in October 2022 by Global University Systems Canada. The university offers undergraduate and graduate programs in biomedical sciences, business, data analytics, management and digital media.

== History ==
The City of Niagara Falls had been actively pursuing the development of a post-secondary campus in its downtown core. In 2013, the city produced a business case and land capacity document with the aim of attracting a campus downtown to support a series of economic development efforts. In October 2022, Jill Dunlop announced the approval of UNF and its initial program offerings. The university is located on 4342 Queen Street. In April 2024, the university started its inaugural term with sixty students in two graduate programs.

In September 2024, the university marked its official opening. The following month, it enrolled over 1,000 students across two undergraduate and three graduate programs.

In September 2025, the university announced the appointment of David Gray as President and Vice-Chancellor.

== Academics ==
The university received approval from the Ontario Ministry of Colleges and Universities in October 2022 to offer five programs:

- Honours of Bachelor of Science – Biomedical Sciences
- Honours Bachelor of Business Administration – Majors in Digital Economy and Digital Marketing
- Master of Data Analytics – Specializations in Marketing Analytics and Operations Analytics
- Master of Management – Specializations in Emerging Technology and Entrepreneurship
- Master of Arts in Digital Media and Global Communications

The programs were designed by academics contracted from other Canadian universities.

In September 2025, the university received approval from the Ontario Ministry of Colleges and Universities to offer three additional master's programs:

- Master of Arts in Applied Social Psychology
- Master of Computer Science in Applied Artificial Intelligence
- Master of Health Care Management

In January 2026, the university announced that it received approval from the Minister of Colleges, Universities, Research Excellence and Security to offer one new undergraduate program and three new master’s programs:

- Honours Bachelor of Science in Bioveterinary Science
- Master of Sustainability Systems
- Master of Regenerative Sustainability
- Master of Water and Food Security

== See also ==
- Brock University
- Education in Ontario
- David Gray (academic)
