= Meanings of minor-planet names: 235001–236000 =

As minor planet discoveries are confirmed, they are given a permanent number by the IAU's Minor Planet Center (MPC), and the discoverers can then submit names for them, following the IAU's naming conventions. The list below concerns those minor planets in the specified number-range that have received names, and explains the meanings of those names.

Official naming citations of newly named small Solar System bodies are approved and published in a bulletin by IAU's Working Group for Small Bodies Nomenclature (WGSBN). Before May 2021, citations were published in MPC's Minor Planet Circulars for many decades. Recent citations can also be found on the JPL Small-Body Database (SBDB). Until his death in 2016, German astronomer Lutz D. Schmadel compiled these citations into the Dictionary of Minor Planet Names (DMP) and regularly updated the collection.

Based on Paul Herget's The Names of the Minor Planets, Schmadel also researched the unclear origin of numerous asteroids, most of which had been named prior to World War II. This article incorporates text from this source, which is in the public domain: SBDB New namings may only be added to this list below after official publication as the preannouncement of names is condemned. The WGSBN publishes a comprehensive guideline for the naming rules of non-cometary small Solar System bodies.

== 235001–235100 ==
Named minor planet	Provisional	This minor planet was named for...	Ref · Catalog
235027 Pommard	2003 FH_{2}	Pommard, a village in eastern France	JPL · 235027

== 235101–235200 ==
back to top

Named minor planet	Provisional	This minor planet was named for...	Ref · Catalog
235145 Ericquirico	2003 QL_{88}	Eric Quirico (born 1967), French member of the New Horizons mission science plasma and atmospheric theme team.	JPL · 235145

== 235201–235300 ==
back to top

Named minor planet	Provisional	This minor planet was named for...	Ref · Catalog
235201 Lorántffy	2003 SG_{158}	Zsuzsanna Lorántffy (1602–1660), a Hungarian aristocrat and wife of Transylvanian prince George Rákóczi I	JPL · 235201

== 235301–235400 ==
back to top

Named minor planet	Provisional	This minor planet was named for...	Ref · Catalog
There are no named minor planets in this number range

== 235401–235500 ==
back to top

Named minor planet	Provisional	This minor planet was named for...	Ref · Catalog
235403 Alysenregiec	2003 WM_{185}	Alysen L. Regiec (born 1975), American web designer at the Johns Hopkins Applied Physics Laboratory.	JPL · 235403

== 235501–235600 ==
back to top

Named minor planet	Provisional	This minor planet was named for...	Ref · Catalog
There are no named minor planets in this number range

== 235601–235700 ==
back to top

Named minor planet	Provisional	This minor planet was named for...	Ref · Catalog
235615 Rosromkondratyuk	2004 PS_{104}	Rostyslav Romanovych Kondratyuk (1938–2024), Ukrainian astronomer, served as the deputy director of the Main Astronomical Observatory of the National Academy of Sciences of Ukraine.	JPL · 235615
235621 Kratochvíle	2004 RK_{3}	Kratochvíle, a South Bohemian Renaissance chateau built by B. Maggi in 1583–1589.	JPL · 235621

== 235701–235800 ==
back to top

Named minor planet	Provisional	This minor planet was named for...	Ref · Catalog
235750 Leahroberson	2004 TU_{353}	Leah V. Roberson (born 1963), American administrative manager at Southwest Research Institute.	JPL · 235750

== 235801–235900 ==
back to top

Named minor planet	Provisional	This minor planet was named for...	Ref · Catalog
235837 Iota	2004 YP_{1}	The International Occultation Timing Association (IOTA), founded in 1983, promotes and encourages observations of occultations by amateurs and professionals by providing event predictions, data analysis, results publication and distribution, and support for the Journal for Occultation Astronomy.	IAU · 235837
235852 Theogeuens	2005 AX_{27}	Theophile (Theo) Geuens (born 1944) was a friend of the discoverer. He is a lecturer in human sciences, a psychotherapist, a coach and a mediator.	IAU · 235852

== 235901–236000 ==
back to top

Named minor planet	Provisional	This minor planet was named for...	Ref · Catalog
235985 Dougrodgers	2005 ER_{317}	Douglas J. Rodgers (born 1980), American computing engineer serving as the Science Operations Center Coordinator for the Parker Solar Probe Mission.	JPL · 235985
235990 Laennec	2005 FP_{2}	René Laennec (1781–1826), a French physician	JPL · 235990
235999 Bucciantini	2005 GA_{22}	Niccolò Bucciantini (born 1976), an astronomer at the Arcetri Observatory in Florence, Italy	MPC · 235999

back to top

Preceded by 234,001–235,000	Meanings of minor-planet names List of minor planets: 235,001–236,000	Succeeded by 236,001–237,000
