= Meanings of minor-planet names: 236001–237000 =

As minor planet discoveries are confirmed, they are given a permanent number by the IAU's Minor Planet Center (MPC), and the discoverers can then submit names for them, following the IAU's naming conventions. The list below concerns those minor planets in the specified number-range that have received names, and explains the meanings of those names.

Official naming citations of newly named small Solar System bodies are approved and published in a bulletin by IAU's Working Group for Small Bodies Nomenclature (WGSBN). Before May 2021, citations were published in MPC's Minor Planet Circulars for many decades. Recent citations can also be found on the JPL Small-Body Database (SBDB). Until his death in 2016, German astronomer Lutz D. Schmadel compiled these citations into the Dictionary of Minor Planet Names (DMP) and regularly updated the collection.

Based on Paul Herget's The Names of the Minor Planets, Schmadel also researched the unclear origin of numerous asteroids, most of which had been named prior to World War II. This article incorporates text from this source, which is in the public domain: SBDB New namings may only be added to this list below after official publication as the preannouncement of names is condemned. The WGSBN publishes a comprehensive guideline for the naming rules of non-cometary small Solar System bodies.

== 236001–236100 ==
Named minor planet	Provisional	This minor planet was named for...	Ref · Catalog
There are no named minor planets in this number range

== 236101–236200 ==
back to top

Named minor planet	Provisional	This minor planet was named for...	Ref · Catalog
236111 Wolfgangbüttner	2005 RW_{4}	Wolfgang Büttner (1905–1998), a German educator and sidewalk astronomer in Dresden.	JPL · 236111
236129 Oysterbay	2005 TJ_{17}	Oyster Bay is a protected harbor along Long Island Sound on the north shore of Long Island, New York, United States. The village of Oyster Bay was the hometown of Theodore Roosevelt, the 26th President of the United States and recipient of the 1906 Nobel Peace Prize.	JPL · 236129
236170 Cholnoky	2005 VP_{7}	Jenő Cholnoky (1870–1950), a Hungarian geographer and professor of geography at the University of Budapest.	JPL · 236170

== 236201–236300 ==
back to top

Named minor planet	Provisional	This minor planet was named for...	Ref · Catalog
236232 Joshalbers	2005 XD_{112}	Joshua M. Albers (born 1986), American mission operations analyst and flight controller.	JPL · 236232

== 236301–236400 ==
back to top

Named minor planet	Provisional	This minor planet was named for...	Ref · Catalog
236305 Adamriess	2006 BU	Adam Riess (born 1969), an American physicist and Nobel laureate	JPL · 236305
236307 Berzsenyi	2006 BF_{9}	Dániel Berzsenyi, Hungarian poet, and landowner.	IAU · 236307

== 236401–236500 ==
back to top

Named minor planet	Provisional	This minor planet was named for...	Ref · Catalog
236463 Bretécher	2006 FF	Claire Bretécher (born 1940), a cartoonist who contributed to many comic-strip magazines, including Spirou, Tintin and Pilote.	JPL · 236463
236484 Luchijen	2006 FQ_{35}	Lu Chi-Jen, an active amateur astronomer in Taiwan.	JPL · 236484

== 236501–236600 ==
back to top

Named minor planet	Provisional	This minor planet was named for...	Ref · Catalog
There are no named minor planets in this number range

== 236601–236700 ==
back to top

Named minor planet	Provisional	This minor planet was named for...	Ref · Catalog
236616 Gray	2006 JR_{61}	David Frank Gray (born 1938), a stellar spectroscopist who has published and written on stellar rotation, magnetic fields, granulation, turbulence, oscillations and spots. He was president of IAU's commission 36, Theory of Stellar Atmospheres, and director of the Elginfield Observatory in Canada (HP, Src)	JPL · 236616
236617 Loriglaze	2006 JL_{63}	Lori S. Glaze (born 1964), American planetary scientist and NASA's director of planetary science during the flyby of Arrokoth by New Horizons.	JPL · 236617
236683 Hujingyao	2006 QE_{111}	Hu Jing-Yao (born 1937), a leading astronomer of National Astronomical Observatories, Chinese Academy of Sciences, and a pioneer optical astronomer in China.	JPL · 236683

== 236701–236800 ==
back to top

Named minor planet	Provisional	This minor planet was named for...	Ref · Catalog
236728 Leandri	2007 HP_{14}	Andree Fernandez (born 1939, née Leandri), a retired software engineer at Meudon Observatory.	JPL · 236728
236743 Zhejiangdaxue	2007 JU_{34}	The Zhejiang University, one of China's oldest institutions of higher education. It was named on the occasion of its 115th anniversary.	JPL · 236743
236746 Chareslindos	2007 LP	Chares of Lindos, an ancient Greek sculptor born on the island of Rhodes from the 3rd century BC. In 282 BCE he built the Colossus of Rhodes, an enormous bronze statue of the sun god Helios and one of the seven Wonders of the Ancient World.	JPL · 236746
236784 Livorno	2007 PU_{27}	Livorno, a port city on the western coast of Tuscany, Italy	JPL · 236784
236785 Hilendàrski	2007 PN_{29}	Paisiy Hilendàrski (1722–1773) was the author of Istoriya Slavyanobolgarskaya, the second modern Bulgarian history.	JPL · 236785
236788 Nanxinda	2007 PM_{35}	Nanxinda is the Chinese abbreviation for the Nanjing University of Information Science & Technology.	IAU · 236788
236800 Broder	2007 QU_{3}	Henryk Broder (born 1946) of Katowice, Poland, who studied German law and political economics at Cologne, Germany	JPL · 236800

== 236801–236900 ==
back to top

Named minor planet	Provisional	This minor planet was named for...	Ref · Catalog
236810 Rutten	2007 RH_{14}	Harrie G. J. Rutten (born 1950), a Dutch optician, and the author of Teleskop Optics, and numerous articles and speeches on popular astronomy that have been well received by the public.	JPL · 236810
236811 Natascharenate	2007 RE_{16}	Natascha Renate Gierlinger (born 1997), daughter of German discoverer Richard Gierlinger	JPL · 236811
236845 Houxianglin	2007 RZ_{118}	Hou Xianglin (1912–2008), an academician of both the Chinese Academy of Sciences and the Chinese Academy of Engineering, was a pioneer of refining and petrochemical technology in China. He was also a petroleum strategist.	JPL · 236845
236851 Chenchikwan	2007 RA_{139}	Chen Chi-kwan (1921–2007), a renowned Taiwanese artist and architect whose designs on the campus of National Central University are some of his masterpieces.	JPL · 236851

== 236901–237000 ==
back to top

Named minor planet	Provisional	This minor planet was named for...	Ref · Catalog
236909 Jakoberwin	2007 TX_{95}	Jakob Erwin Gierlinger (born 2002) is the son of the discoverer, Richard Gierlinger. He is an IT specialist and member of the observatory Gaisberg. At the observatory, he is responsible for software development.	JPL · 236909
236984 Astier	2008 PP_{21}	Alexandre Astier (born 1974), a French humorist, actor, scriptwriter and film director	JPL · 236984
236987 Deustua	2008 QX_{9}	Susana E. Deustua (born 1961), an astronomer at the U.S. Space Telescope Science Institute in Baltimore, Maryland	JPL · 236987
236988 Robberto	2008 QE_{12}	Massimo Robberto (born 1958), an astronomer at the U.S. Space Telescope Science Institute in Baltimore, Maryland	JPL · 236988

back to top

Preceded by 235,001–236,000	Meanings of minor-planet names List of minor planets: 236,001–237,000	Succeeded by 237,001–238,000
