= David Gray (academic) =

Academic and university administrator

David Gray is a university professor and administrator who is currently serving as the President and Vice-Chancellor of the University of Niagara Falls Canada. He was previously the university’s Provost and Vice-President, Academic. Prior to this, he served for a decade as the Dean of the Faculty of Agriculture at Dalhousie University, and as Campus Principal for its Agriculture Campus.

== Education ==
Gray holds a degree in Marine Biology from the University College of North Wales in Bangor, United Kingdom and a PhD in Zoology from Rhodes University in South Africa.

== Career ==
=== Academia ===
Gray began his career as a zoology professor at the University of Western Cape and Rhodes University in South Africa. He then relocated to the United Kingdom to work as a lecturer and in senior academic roles at the University of Exeter; Hartpury College, then part of the University of West England; the University of Derby, Buxton and Buxton College for Further Education. In 2008, he was named the Director of the NACF Marine Centre at the University of the Highlands and Islands in the Shetland Islands. During his time there, he was asked to also serve as Principal of Shetland College.

In 2013, Gray moved to Canada to be Dean of the Faculty of Agriculture at Dalhousie University, and as Campus Principal for its Agriculture Campus.

In 2023, Gray was named the inaugural Provost and Vice-President, Academic at the University of Niagara Falls Canada. He was later appointed as the university’s President and Vice-Chancellor in 2025.

=== Advisory work ===
In 2015, Gray was appointed to the Nova Scotia Ministry of Agriculture & Fisheries’ Aquaculture Science Advisory Committee, a five-member advisory panel of scientists guiding the province’s aquaculture reset.

== Honours ==
In 2022, Gray was awarded the Queen Elizabeth II Platinum Jubilee Medal for his service in higher education in Canada.
