= David Gray (cricketer) =

English cricketer

Personal information
- Full name: David Anthony Athelstan Gray
- Born: 19 June 1922; Kensington, London, England
- Died: 9 November 2003 (aged 81); Bristol, England
- Batting: Right-handed
- Bowling: Slow left-arm orthodox
- Role: Bowler

Domestic team information
- Years: Team
- 1947: Cambridge University
- 1947: Essex

Career statistics
| Competition | First-class |
|---|---|
| Matches | 3 |
| Runs scored | 22 |
| Batting average | 4.40 |
| 100s/50s | 0/0 |
| Top score | 8 |
| Balls bowled | 482 |
| Wickets | 3 |
| Bowling average | 60.66 |
| 5 wickets in innings | 0 |
| 10 wickets in match | 0 |
| Best bowling | 2/67 |
| Catches/stumpings | 1/– |
- Source: Cricinfo, 19 July 2013

David Anthony Athelstan Gray DFC (19 June 1922 – 9 November 2003) was an English cricketer. He made three first-class appearances in 1947, playing for Cambridge University and Essex County Cricket Club.

Born at Kensington in 1922, Gray was educated at Winchester College where he played cricket in the school team, captaining it in 1941. Described as bolding "steadily and sensibly", in 1940 he took six wickets in the college's victory against Harrow. As captain the following season Wisden thought that he "bowled most intelligently and encouraged others to follow his example" and considered him a "good captain". A slow left-arm orthodox bowler, the almanack considered him one of the leading schoolboy cricketers in his final year at Winchester, selecting him in its Public Schools XI in the 1942 edition.

After leaving school, Gray joined the Royal Air Force. He served in Bomber Command for the remainder of World War II, winning the Distinguished Flying Cross. Following the war he went up to Cambridge. He played for Essex Second XI in 1946 before making his three first-class appearances the following season, playing twice for the university in early May. He made his only senior appearance for Essex in a match against the university later in the month. He took three first-class wickets, two for Cambridge and one for Essex.

Gray worked for the Imperial Tobacco Company in Bristol. He died in the city in 2003, aged 81.
