= David Gray (Australian musician) =

Australian singer

- Born: David Gray; Australia
- Genres: pop music
- Occupation: Musician

David Gray (~1933–1994) was an Australian singer. He earned gold and platinum awards and performed in England, USA and South Africa. He sang show tunes and had a vocal range spanning from bass to soprano.

== Discography ==
=== Albums ===
List of albums, with Australian chart positions
| Title | Album details | Peak chart positions | |
| Title | Album details | AUS | UK |
|---|---|---|---|
| Showtime with David Gray | Released: 1974; Format: LP; Label: Ata Records (L-25185) | - | - |
| Armchair Melodies | Released: November 1975; Format: LP; Label: Dyna House (CD2028) | 59 | 21 |
| David Gray Sings (With The Sven Libaek Orchestra) | Released: 1976; Format: LP; Label: M7 (MLR 159) | 36 | - |
| David Gray Sings the Great Musicals | Released: 1977; Format: LP; Label: M7 (MLR 172) | - | - |
| Something Old Something New | Released: 1977; Format: LP; Label: M7 (MLR 177) | 70 | - |
| Together (with June Bronhill) | Released: 1979; Format: LP; Label: Endeavour Records (END 001) | 88 | - |
| Magical Melodies - 30 Tenor Favourites (with Tommy Tycho And Sven Libaek) | Released: 1979; Format: LP; Label: J&B Records (JB028) | - | - |

=== Appearances ===
- Tommy Tycho's A Night with Cole Porter - Tommy Tycho and his Orchestra (with Peter Brandon, Clare Poole Singers, David Gray, Mary Anne Boyd and Neville Marshall) (Festival 1975)
