= Meanings of minor-planet names: 233001–234000 =

As minor planet discoveries are confirmed, they are given a permanent number by the IAU's Minor Planet Center (MPC), and the discoverers can then submit names for them, following the IAU's naming conventions. The list below concerns those minor planets in the specified number-range that have received names, and explains the meanings of those names.

Official naming citations of newly named small Solar System bodies are approved and published in a bulletin by IAU's Working Group for Small Bodies Nomenclature (WGSBN). Before May 2021, citations were published in MPC's Minor Planet Circulars for many decades. Recent citations can also be found on the JPL Small-Body Database (SBDB). Until his death in 2016, German astronomer Lutz D. Schmadel compiled these citations into the Dictionary of Minor Planet Names (DMP) and regularly updated the collection.

Based on Paul Herget's The Names of the Minor Planets, Schmadel also researched the unclear origin of numerous asteroids, most of which had been named prior to World War II. This article incorporates text from this source, which is in the public domain: SBDB New namings may only be added to this list below after official publication as the preannouncement of names is condemned. The WGSBN publishes a comprehensive guideline for the naming rules of non-cometary small Solar System bodies.

== 233001–233100 ==
Named minor planet	Provisional	This minor planet was named for...	Ref · Catalog
There are no named minor planets in this number range

== 233101–233200 ==
back to top

Named minor planet	Provisional	This minor planet was named for...	Ref · Catalog
There are no named minor planets in this number range

== 233201–233300 ==
back to top

Named minor planet	Provisional	This minor planet was named for...	Ref · Catalog
233214 Gailoxton	2005 XT_{110}	Gail Oxton (born 1960), American engineer who developed flight software for multiple space flight missions.	JPL · 233214
233292 Brianschmidt	2006 BV	Brian Schmidt (born 1967), American physicist, who won the who the Nobel Prize for the discovery of the accelerating expansion of the universe, using supernovae as standard candles	JPL · 233292

== 233301–233400 ==
back to top

Named minor planet	Provisional	This minor planet was named for...	Ref · Catalog
233383 Assisneto	2006 EP	Vicente Ferreira de Assis Neto (1936–2004), a Brazilian amateur astronomer.	JPL · 233383

== 233401–233500 ==
back to top

Named minor planet	Provisional	This minor planet was named for...	Ref · Catalog
233459 Gregquicke	2006 JJ_{62}	Greg Quicke (1961–2024), Australian amateur astronomer, astronomy tour operator and author.	JPL · 233459
233472 Moorcroft	2006 KB_{143}	Donald Ross Moorcroft (born 1935), a Canadian physicist.	JPL · 233472
233486 Thankároly	2006 UF_{1}	Károly Than, Hungarian chemist and full member of the Hungarian Academy of Sciences.	IAU · 233486
233488 Cosandey	2006 YG	David A. Cosandey (born 1965) is a Swiss physicist. He has developed a theory of science explaining the rises and declines of the main scientific disciplines, including astronomy, in the history of the West, the Middle East, India and China.	IAU · 233488

== 233501–233600 ==
back to top

Named minor planet	Provisional	This minor planet was named for...	Ref · Catalog
233522 Moye	2007 HB_{4}	Marcel Moye (1873–1939), a founding member of the Flammarion Astronomical Society of Montpellier, which administered the Babote Observatory from 1902 to 1922.	JPL · 233522
233544 Jinyaqiu	2007 JY_{22}	Ya-Qiu Jin, academician of the Chinese Academy of Sciences, specializes in electromagnetic scattering and microwave remote sensing.	IAU · 233544
233547 Luxun	2007 JR_{27}	Lu Xun (or Lu Hsün), the pen name of Zhou Shuren (1881–1936), one of the major Chinese writers of the twentieth century.	JPL · 233547
233559 Pizzetti	2007 PJ	Gianpaolo Pizzetti (born 1961), an Italian amateur astronomer and discoverer of minor planets at the Lumezzane Observatory (130)	JPL · 233559
233583 Karafiáth	2007 RR	Orsolya Karafiáth, Hungarian writer, poet, translator, and journalist.	IAU · 233583

== 233601–233700 ==
back to top

Named minor planet	Provisional	This minor planet was named for...	Ref · Catalog
233653 Rether	2008 QR	Hagen Rether (born 1969), a Romanian-born German political cabaret artist who studied music at the Folkwang University of the Arts	JPL · 233653
233661 Alytus	2008 QZ_{32}	The city of Alytus in southern Lithuania	JPL · 233661

== 233701–233800 ==
back to top

Named minor planet	Provisional	This minor planet was named for...	Ref · Catalog
233707 Alfons	2008 SA_{83}	Emmanuel Peterfalvi (born 1967), known as "Alfons", is a French-German cabaret artist.	JPL · 233707

== 233801–233900 ==
back to top

Named minor planet	Provisional	This minor planet was named for...	Ref · Catalog
233880 Urbanpriol	2008 WF_{93}	Urban Priol (born 1961), a German cabaret artist.	JPL · 233880
233893 Honthyhanna	2008 YW_{5}	Hanna Honthy (1893–1978), a Hungarian opera singer and actress.	JPL · 233893

== 233901–234000 ==
back to top

Named minor planet	Provisional	This minor planet was named for...	Ref · Catalog
233943 Falera	2008 YW_{5}	The Swiss mountain village of Falera, location of the Mirasteilas Observatory where this asteroid was discovered	JPL · 233943
233967 Vierkant	2010 BN_{4}	Gisela Vierkant (1919–), mother of the discoverer Rainer Kracht	JPL · 233967

back to top

Preceded by 232,001–233,000	Meanings of minor-planet names List of minor planets: 233,001–234,000	Succeeded by 234,001–235,000
