= List of minor planets: 233001–234000 =

The following is a partial list of minor planets, running from minor-planet number 233001 through 234000, inclusive. The primary data for this and other partial lists is based on JPL's "Small-Body Orbital Elements" and data available from the Minor Planet Center. Critical list information is also provided by the MPC, unless otherwise specified from Lowell Observatory. A detailed description of the table's columns and additional sources are given on the main page including a complete list of every page in this series, and a statistical break-up on the dynamical classification of minor planets.

Also see the summary list of all named bodies in numerical and alphabetical order, and the corresponding naming citations for the number range of this particular list. New namings may only be added to this list after official publication, as the preannouncement of names is condemned by the Working Group for Small Bodies Nomenclature of the International Astronomical Union.

Near-Earth obj.	MBA (inner)	MBA (outer)	Centaur
Mars-crosser	MBA (middle)	Jupiter trojan	Trans-Neptunian obj.
Unclassified

== 233001–233100 ==
Designation			Discovery			Properties		Ref
Permanent	Provisional	Named after	Date	Site	Discoverer(s)	Category	Diam.	Ref
233001	2005 EF_{184}	—	March 9, 2005	Mount Lemmon	Mount Lemmon Survey	·	3.6 km	MPC · JPL
233002	2005 EJ_{185}	—	March 9, 2005	Siding Spring	SSS	LIX	6.3 km	MPC · JPL
233003	2005 EG_{189}	—	March 10, 2005	Siding Spring	SSS	·	3.1 km	MPC · JPL
233004	2005 ED_{194}	—	March 11, 2005	Mount Lemmon	Mount Lemmon Survey	·	4.7 km	MPC · JPL
233005	2005 EA_{200}	—	March 12, 2005	Mount Lemmon	Mount Lemmon Survey	·	3.4 km	MPC · JPL
233006	2005 EY_{203}	—	March 11, 2005	Kitt Peak	Spacewatch	EOS	2.7 km	MPC · JPL
233007	2005 EE_{206}	—	March 13, 2005	Catalina	CSS	·	4.6 km	MPC · JPL
233008	2005 EG_{206}	—	March 13, 2005	Catalina	CSS	·	4.1 km	MPC · JPL
233009	2005 EQ_{207}	—	March 11, 2005	Mount Lemmon	Mount Lemmon Survey	·	3.9 km	MPC · JPL
233010	2005 EY_{208}	—	March 4, 2005	Kitt Peak	Spacewatch	·	3.9 km	MPC · JPL
233011	2005 EX_{213}	—	March 7, 2005	Socorro	LINEAR	·	6.5 km	MPC · JPL
233012	2005 EG_{214}	—	March 7, 2005	Socorro	LINEAR	EOS	3.5 km	MPC · JPL
233013	2005 EH_{216}	—	March 8, 2005	Mount Lemmon	Mount Lemmon Survey	·	3.9 km	MPC · JPL
233014	2005 EJ_{216}	—	March 8, 2005	Mount Lemmon	Mount Lemmon Survey	EOS	2.6 km	MPC · JPL
233015	2005 EP_{219}	—	March 10, 2005	Mount Lemmon	Mount Lemmon Survey	·	4.4 km	MPC · JPL
233016	2005 EZ_{224}	—	March 12, 2005	Socorro	LINEAR	T_{j} (2.94)	4.4 km	MPC · JPL
233017	2005 EC_{247}	—	March 12, 2005	Kitt Peak	Spacewatch	THM	3.5 km	MPC · JPL
233018	2005 EP_{248}	—	March 12, 2005	Kitt Peak	Spacewatch	·	3.9 km	MPC · JPL
233019	2005 EG_{251}	—	March 10, 2005	Catalina	CSS	·	3.3 km	MPC · JPL
233020	2005 ER_{257}	—	March 11, 2005	Mount Lemmon	Mount Lemmon Survey	HYG	2.7 km	MPC · JPL
233021	2005 EY_{257}	—	March 11, 2005	Mount Lemmon	Mount Lemmon Survey	·	2.5 km	MPC · JPL
233022	2005 EG_{261}	—	March 12, 2005	Socorro	LINEAR	EOS	2.8 km	MPC · JPL
233023	2005 ER_{264}	—	March 13, 2005	Kitt Peak	Spacewatch	·	3.2 km	MPC · JPL
233024	2005 EN_{269}	—	March 15, 2005	Mount Lemmon	Mount Lemmon Survey	·	3.1 km	MPC · JPL
233025	2005 EX_{270}	—	March 1, 2005	Catalina	CSS	JUN	1.7 km	MPC · JPL
233026	2005 ET_{271}	—	March 3, 2005	Catalina	CSS	·	3.1 km	MPC · JPL
233027	2005 EQ_{274}	—	March 8, 2005	Catalina	CSS	·	3.8 km	MPC · JPL
233028	2005 EP_{278}	—	March 9, 2005	Socorro	LINEAR	·	3.1 km	MPC · JPL
233029	2005 EE_{280}	—	March 10, 2005	Catalina	CSS	·	4.9 km	MPC · JPL
233030	2005 EC_{284}	—	March 11, 2005	Anderson Mesa	LONEOS	·	4.2 km	MPC · JPL
233031	2005 EJ_{290}	—	March 9, 2005	Siding Spring	SSS	TIR	3.4 km	MPC · JPL
233032	2005 EM_{292}	—	March 10, 2005	Catalina	CSS	DOR	3.6 km	MPC · JPL
233033	2005 ER_{293}	—	March 11, 2005	Catalina	CSS	EOS	2.9 km	MPC · JPL
233034	2005 EM_{295}	—	March 13, 2005	Catalina	CSS	·	3.6 km	MPC · JPL
233035	2005 EQ_{318}	—	March 3, 2005	Catalina	CSS	·	4.2 km	MPC · JPL
233036	2005 EG_{330}	—	March 2, 2005	Catalina	CSS	·	4.2 km	MPC · JPL
233037	2005 FA_{8}	—	March 30, 2005	Catalina	CSS	LUT	6.4 km	MPC · JPL
233038	2005 GE_{3}	—	April 1, 2005	Catalina	CSS	·	3.1 km	MPC · JPL
233039	2005 GB_{13}	—	April 1, 2005	Anderson Mesa	LONEOS	·	4.1 km	MPC · JPL
233040	2005 GC_{19}	—	April 2, 2005	Palomar	NEAT	·	4.2 km	MPC · JPL
233041	2005 GH_{22}	—	April 4, 2005	Catalina	CSS	·	4.6 km	MPC · JPL
233042	2005 GN_{27}	—	April 3, 2005	Palomar	NEAT	THM	3.8 km	MPC · JPL
233043	2005 GQ_{28}	—	April 4, 2005	Kitt Peak	Spacewatch	·	3.5 km	MPC · JPL
233044	2005 GF_{33}	—	April 4, 2005	Črni Vrh	Skvarč, J.	EUP	6.4 km	MPC · JPL
233045	2005 GE_{37}	—	April 2, 2005	Catalina	CSS	·	6.8 km	MPC · JPL
233046	2005 GO_{41}	—	April 5, 2005	Mount Lemmon	Mount Lemmon Survey	·	2.5 km	MPC · JPL
233047	2005 GB_{47}	—	April 5, 2005	Mount Lemmon	Mount Lemmon Survey	·	3.8 km	MPC · JPL
233048	2005 GK_{49}	—	April 5, 2005	Mount Lemmon	Mount Lemmon Survey	THM	3.7 km	MPC · JPL
233049	2005 GT_{57}	—	April 6, 2005	Mount Lemmon	Mount Lemmon Survey	·	6.0 km	MPC · JPL
233050	2005 GU_{67}	—	April 2, 2005	Catalina	CSS	(10654)	4.3 km	MPC · JPL
233051	2005 GP_{77}	—	April 6, 2005	Catalina	CSS	·	5.9 km	MPC · JPL
233052	2005 GG_{79}	—	April 6, 2005	Catalina	CSS	·	2.4 km	MPC · JPL
233053	2005 GW_{80}	—	April 7, 2005	Kitt Peak	Spacewatch	·	4.6 km	MPC · JPL
233054	2005 GA_{88}	—	April 5, 2005	Anderson Mesa	LONEOS	·	2.7 km	MPC · JPL
233055	2005 GA_{111}	—	April 2, 2005	Kitt Peak	Spacewatch	·	2.4 km	MPC · JPL
233056	2005 GP_{112}	—	April 6, 2005	Kitt Peak	Spacewatch	·	3.7 km	MPC · JPL
233057	2005 GV_{114}	—	April 10, 2005	Mount Lemmon	Mount Lemmon Survey	THM	3.9 km	MPC · JPL
233058	2005 GU_{127}	—	April 12, 2005	Socorro	LINEAR	EUP	5.2 km	MPC · JPL
233059	2005 GH_{136}	—	April 10, 2005	Kitt Peak	Spacewatch	LIX	4.9 km	MPC · JPL
233060	2005 GX_{141}	—	April 9, 2005	Socorro	LINEAR	·	3.0 km	MPC · JPL
233061	2005 GH_{146}	—	April 11, 2005	Kitt Peak	Spacewatch	·	3.0 km	MPC · JPL
233062	2005 GO_{149}	—	April 11, 2005	Kitt Peak	Spacewatch	·	2.8 km	MPC · JPL
233063	2005 GD_{162}	—	April 14, 2005	Kitt Peak	Spacewatch	THM	2.8 km	MPC · JPL
233064	2005 GJ_{166}	—	April 11, 2005	Mount Lemmon	Mount Lemmon Survey	·	3.4 km	MPC · JPL
233065	2005 GL_{167}	—	April 11, 2005	Mount Lemmon	Mount Lemmon Survey	·	3.0 km	MPC · JPL
233066	2005 GT_{208}	—	April 1, 2005	Catalina	CSS	·	5.5 km	MPC · JPL
233067	2005 JR	—	May 3, 2005	Socorro	LINEAR	THM	3.3 km	MPC · JPL
233068	2005 JT_{3}	—	May 1, 2005	Siding Spring	SSS	·	4.0 km	MPC · JPL
233069	2005 JJ_{67}	—	May 4, 2005	Catalina	CSS	CYB	4.1 km	MPC · JPL
233070	2005 JS_{68}	—	May 6, 2005	Socorro	LINEAR	·	5.7 km	MPC · JPL
233071	2005 JY_{70}	—	May 7, 2005	Catalina	CSS	·	4.5 km	MPC · JPL
233072	2005 JC_{80}	—	May 10, 2005	Mount Lemmon	Mount Lemmon Survey	MAS	710 m	MPC · JPL
233073	2005 JP_{106}	—	May 12, 2005	Palomar	NEAT	·	5.2 km	MPC · JPL
233074	2005 LQ_{10}	—	June 3, 2005	Kitt Peak	Spacewatch	NAE	4.9 km	MPC · JPL
233075	2005 NX_{14}	—	July 3, 2005	Mount Lemmon	Mount Lemmon Survey	LIX	6.2 km	MPC · JPL
233076	2005 ND_{15}	—	July 1, 2005	Campo Imperatore	CINEOS	·	7.4 km	MPC · JPL
233077	2005 NE_{26}	—	July 4, 2005	Palomar	NEAT	·	4.1 km	MPC · JPL
233078	2005 NF_{63}	—	July 13, 2005	Mayhill	Lowe, A.	PHO	3.2 km	MPC · JPL
233079	2005 NM_{123}	—	July 9, 2005	Kitt Peak	Spacewatch	·	1.7 km	MPC · JPL
233080	2005 PG	—	August 2, 2005	Socorro	LINEAR	·	1.8 km	MPC · JPL
233081	2005 QW_{16}	—	August 25, 2005	Palomar	NEAT	·	1.4 km	MPC · JPL
233082	2005 QX_{74}	—	August 24, 2005	Kingsnake	J. V. McClusky	·	3.3 km	MPC · JPL
233083	2005 QA_{75}	—	August 24, 2005	Palomar	NEAT	·	980 m	MPC · JPL
233084	2005 QH_{86}	—	August 30, 2005	Kitt Peak	Spacewatch	·	1.4 km	MPC · JPL
233085	2005 QV_{89}	—	August 24, 2005	Palomar	NEAT	·	1.9 km	MPC · JPL
233086	2005 QQ_{114}	—	August 27, 2005	Palomar	NEAT	·	1.1 km	MPC · JPL
233087	2005 QZ_{188}	—	August 31, 2005	Kitt Peak	Spacewatch	·	790 m	MPC · JPL
233088	2005 RZ_{3}	—	September 1, 2005	Kitt Peak	Spacewatch	·	1.0 km	MPC · JPL
233089	2005 RZ_{17}	—	September 1, 2005	Kitt Peak	Spacewatch	NYS	1.8 km	MPC · JPL
233090	2005 RM_{26}	—	September 8, 2005	Socorro	LINEAR	·	1.0 km	MPC · JPL
233091	2005 RF_{28}	—	September 11, 2005	Anderson Mesa	LONEOS	·	950 m	MPC · JPL
233092	2005 RO_{30}	—	September 10, 2005	Anderson Mesa	LONEOS	·	1.9 km	MPC · JPL
233093	2005 RV_{33}	—	September 13, 2005	Anderson Mesa	LONEOS	EUN	3.0 km	MPC · JPL
233094	2005 RN_{45}	—	September 14, 2005	Kitt Peak	Spacewatch	·	940 m	MPC · JPL
233095	2005 SJ_{3}	—	September 23, 2005	Catalina	CSS	·	990 m	MPC · JPL
233096	2005 SX_{8}	—	September 25, 2005	Kitt Peak	Spacewatch	·	1.1 km	MPC · JPL
233097	2005 SL_{24}	—	September 24, 2005	Anderson Mesa	LONEOS	·	1.1 km	MPC · JPL
233098	2005 SC_{27}	—	September 23, 2005	Kitt Peak	Spacewatch	·	1.2 km	MPC · JPL
233099	2005 SA_{48}	—	September 24, 2005	Kitt Peak	Spacewatch	·	800 m	MPC · JPL
233100	2005 SR_{56}	—	September 26, 2005	Kitt Peak	Spacewatch	ERI	1.6 km	MPC · JPL

== 233101–233200 ==
back to top

Designation			Discovery			Properties		Ref
Permanent	Provisional	Named after	Date	Site	Discoverer(s)	Category	Diam.	Ref
233101	2005 SE_{78}	—	September 24, 2005	Kitt Peak	Spacewatch	·	1.1 km	MPC · JPL
233102	2005 SF_{81}	—	September 24, 2005	Kitt Peak	Spacewatch	·	1.6 km	MPC · JPL
233103	2005 SA_{90}	—	September 24, 2005	Kitt Peak	Spacewatch	·	910 m	MPC · JPL
233104	2005 SX_{94}	—	September 25, 2005	Palomar	NEAT	PHO	1.6 km	MPC · JPL
233105	2005 SO_{103}	—	September 25, 2005	Palomar	NEAT	·	2.6 km	MPC · JPL
233106	2005 SB_{104}	—	September 25, 2005	Palomar	NEAT	·	1.3 km	MPC · JPL
233107	2005 ST_{115}	—	September 27, 2005	Kitt Peak	Spacewatch	·	680 m	MPC · JPL
233108	2005 SG_{134}	—	September 30, 2005	Calvin-Rehoboth	L. A. Molnar	·	720 m	MPC · JPL
233109	2005 SA_{137}	—	September 24, 2005	Kitt Peak	Spacewatch	·	2.1 km	MPC · JPL
233110	2005 SG_{158}	—	September 26, 2005	Palomar	NEAT	NYS	1.3 km	MPC · JPL
233111	2005 SW_{162}	—	September 27, 2005	Socorro	LINEAR	·	1.8 km	MPC · JPL
233112	2005 SM_{165}	—	September 28, 2005	Palomar	NEAT	·	890 m	MPC · JPL
233113	2005 SP_{218}	—	September 30, 2005	Palomar	NEAT	·	1.3 km	MPC · JPL
233114	2005 ST_{221}	—	September 30, 2005	Catalina	CSS	PHO	2.1 km	MPC · JPL
233115	2005 SY_{226}	—	September 30, 2005	Kitt Peak	Spacewatch	·	730 m	MPC · JPL
233116	2005 SZ_{232}	—	September 30, 2005	Mount Lemmon	Mount Lemmon Survey	MAS	740 m	MPC · JPL
233117	2005 SQ_{257}	—	September 18, 2005	Palomar	NEAT	·	1.7 km	MPC · JPL
233118	2005 TW_{7}	—	October 1, 2005	Kitt Peak	Spacewatch	·	1.9 km	MPC · JPL
233119	2005 TH_{21}	—	October 1, 2005	Kitt Peak	Spacewatch	·	810 m	MPC · JPL
233120	2005 TN_{24}	—	October 1, 2005	Mount Lemmon	Mount Lemmon Survey	·	1.4 km	MPC · JPL
233121	2005 TD_{40}	—	October 1, 2005	Kitt Peak	Spacewatch	·	900 m	MPC · JPL
233122	2005 TP_{59}	—	October 2, 2005	Mount Lemmon	Mount Lemmon Survey	fast	890 m	MPC · JPL
233123	2005 TB_{60}	—	October 2, 2005	Mount Lemmon	Mount Lemmon Survey	·	890 m	MPC · JPL
233124	2005 TF_{83}	—	October 3, 2005	Socorro	LINEAR	·	1 km	MPC · JPL
233125	2005 TB_{86}	—	October 3, 2005	Palomar	NEAT	·	1.1 km	MPC · JPL
233126	2005 TY_{103}	—	October 8, 2005	Socorro	LINEAR	·	980 m	MPC · JPL
233127	2005 TB_{128}	—	October 7, 2005	Kitt Peak	Spacewatch	·	740 m	MPC · JPL
233128	2005 TY_{187}	—	October 8, 2005	Kitt Peak	Spacewatch	ERI	2.7 km	MPC · JPL
233129	2005 UT_{18}	—	October 22, 2005	Kitt Peak	Spacewatch	·	2.2 km	MPC · JPL
233130	2005 UD_{41}	—	October 24, 2005	Kitt Peak	Spacewatch	NYS	1.3 km	MPC · JPL
233131	2005 UO_{41}	—	October 25, 2005	Catalina	CSS	BAR	1.8 km	MPC · JPL
233132	2005 UB_{51}	—	October 23, 2005	Catalina	CSS	·	1.0 km	MPC · JPL
233133	2005 UZ_{58}	—	October 24, 2005	Kitt Peak	Spacewatch	·	1.5 km	MPC · JPL
233134	2005 UN_{77}	—	October 24, 2005	Palomar	NEAT	·	1.5 km	MPC · JPL
233135	2005 UF_{84}	—	October 22, 2005	Kitt Peak	Spacewatch	·	1.0 km	MPC · JPL
233136	2005 UF_{106}	—	October 22, 2005	Kitt Peak	Spacewatch	·	1.7 km	MPC · JPL
233137	2005 UU_{109}	—	October 22, 2005	Kitt Peak	Spacewatch	·	1.2 km	MPC · JPL
233138	2005 UC_{110}	—	October 22, 2005	Kitt Peak	Spacewatch	·	990 m	MPC · JPL
233139	2005 UC_{112}	—	October 22, 2005	Kitt Peak	Spacewatch	·	1.3 km	MPC · JPL
233140	2005 UY_{131}	—	October 24, 2005	Palomar	NEAT	·	1.2 km	MPC · JPL
233141	2005 UG_{132}	—	October 24, 2005	Palomar	NEAT	PHO	1.8 km	MPC · JPL
233142	2005 UP_{161}	—	October 24, 2005	Palomar	NEAT	·	3.3 km	MPC · JPL
233143	2005 UK_{163}	—	October 23, 2005	Catalina	CSS	MAS	930 m	MPC · JPL
233144	2005 UH_{165}	—	October 24, 2005	Kitt Peak	Spacewatch	·	720 m	MPC · JPL
233145	2005 US_{178}	—	October 24, 2005	Kitt Peak	Spacewatch	·	1.2 km	MPC · JPL
233146	2005 UC_{183}	—	October 24, 2005	Kitt Peak	Spacewatch	NYS	1.1 km	MPC · JPL
233147	2005 UB_{214}	—	October 23, 2005	Palomar	NEAT	ERI	2.6 km	MPC · JPL
233148	2005 UP_{214}	—	October 26, 2005	Palomar	NEAT	·	1.2 km	MPC · JPL
233149	2005 UM_{224}	—	October 25, 2005	Kitt Peak	Spacewatch	NYS	1.4 km	MPC · JPL
233150	2005 UR_{230}	—	October 25, 2005	Catalina	CSS	·	2.6 km	MPC · JPL
233151	2005 UX_{241}	—	October 25, 2005	Kitt Peak	Spacewatch	·	1.8 km	MPC · JPL
233152	2005 UZ_{244}	—	October 25, 2005	Kitt Peak	Spacewatch	·	1.3 km	MPC · JPL
233153	2005 UB_{260}	—	October 25, 2005	Kitt Peak	Spacewatch	·	830 m	MPC · JPL
233154	2005 UC_{321}	—	October 27, 2005	Kitt Peak	Spacewatch	·	960 m	MPC · JPL
233155	2005 UW_{342}	—	October 29, 2005	Catalina	CSS	NYS	2.4 km	MPC · JPL
233156	2005 UO_{354}	—	October 29, 2005	Catalina	CSS	·	1.6 km	MPC · JPL
233157	2005 UJ_{364}	—	October 27, 2005	Kitt Peak	Spacewatch	·	1.5 km	MPC · JPL
233158	2005 UZ_{378}	—	October 29, 2005	Mount Lemmon	Mount Lemmon Survey	·	780 m	MPC · JPL
233159	2005 UD_{387}	—	October 30, 2005	Mount Lemmon	Mount Lemmon Survey	·	930 m	MPC · JPL
233160	2005 UT_{428}	—	October 28, 2005	Kitt Peak	Spacewatch	·	1.6 km	MPC · JPL
233161	2005 UQ_{442}	—	October 29, 2005	Palomar	NEAT	·	3.3 km	MPC · JPL
233162	2005 UZ_{443}	—	October 30, 2005	Socorro	LINEAR	·	1.4 km	MPC · JPL
233163	2005 US_{449}	—	October 30, 2005	Socorro	LINEAR	(2076)	1.1 km	MPC · JPL
233164	2005 UN_{475}	—	October 22, 2005	Kitt Peak	Spacewatch	·	870 m	MPC · JPL
233165	2005 UN_{477}	—	October 26, 2005	Kitt Peak	Spacewatch	V	950 m	MPC · JPL
233166	2005 UF_{508}	—	October 24, 2005	Mauna Kea	D. J. Tholen	·	1.6 km	MPC · JPL
233167	2005 UL_{509}	—	October 30, 2005	Mount Lemmon	Mount Lemmon Survey	NYS	1.2 km	MPC · JPL
233168	2005 VJ_{4}	—	November 6, 2005	Mayhill	Lowe, A.	·	1.1 km	MPC · JPL
233169	2005 VF_{15}	—	November 1, 2005	Socorro	LINEAR	·	970 m	MPC · JPL
233170	2005 VT_{16}	—	November 3, 2005	Catalina	CSS	·	1.3 km	MPC · JPL
233171	2005 VE_{21}	—	November 1, 2005	Kitt Peak	Spacewatch	V	770 m	MPC · JPL
233172	2005 VL_{21}	—	November 1, 2005	Kitt Peak	Spacewatch	·	710 m	MPC · JPL
233173	2005 VJ_{41}	—	November 4, 2005	Mount Lemmon	Mount Lemmon Survey	·	1.4 km	MPC · JPL
233174	2005 VX_{69}	—	November 1, 2005	Mount Lemmon	Mount Lemmon Survey	·	1.6 km	MPC · JPL
233175	2005 VJ_{78}	—	November 6, 2005	Kitt Peak	Spacewatch	·	2.4 km	MPC · JPL
233176	2005 VX_{119}	—	November 4, 2005	Kitt Peak	Spacewatch	HNS	2.1 km	MPC · JPL
233177	2005 VQ_{123}	—	November 1, 2005	Mount Lemmon	Mount Lemmon Survey	NYS	1.0 km	MPC · JPL
233178	2005 VG_{125}	—	November 12, 2005	Kitt Peak	Spacewatch	JUN	1.4 km	MPC · JPL
233179	2005 WJ_{24}	—	November 21, 2005	Kitt Peak	Spacewatch	NYS	1.3 km	MPC · JPL
233180	2005 WU_{25}	—	November 21, 2005	Kitt Peak	Spacewatch	·	1.6 km	MPC · JPL
233181	2005 WX_{29}	—	November 21, 2005	Kitt Peak	Spacewatch	·	1.9 km	MPC · JPL
233182	2005 WF_{41}	—	November 21, 2005	Kitt Peak	Spacewatch	(2076)	1.1 km	MPC · JPL
233183	2005 WW_{55}	—	November 28, 2005	Socorro	LINEAR	·	1.4 km	MPC · JPL
233184	2005 WZ_{60}	—	November 25, 2005	Kitt Peak	Spacewatch	NYS	1.2 km	MPC · JPL
233185	2005 WC_{62}	—	November 25, 2005	Catalina	CSS	·	3.5 km	MPC · JPL
233186	2005 WU_{80}	—	November 26, 2005	Mount Lemmon	Mount Lemmon Survey	·	1.0 km	MPC · JPL
233187	2005 WF_{82}	—	November 25, 2005	Kitt Peak	Spacewatch	NYS	1.2 km	MPC · JPL
233188	2005 WM_{89}	—	November 26, 2005	Kitt Peak	Spacewatch	V	990 m	MPC · JPL
233189	2005 WR_{100}	—	November 29, 2005	Socorro	LINEAR	·	4.9 km	MPC · JPL
233190	2005 WQ_{112}	—	November 30, 2005	Mount Lemmon	Mount Lemmon Survey	EUN	1.6 km	MPC · JPL
233191	2005 WM_{137}	—	November 26, 2005	Mount Lemmon	Mount Lemmon Survey	·	570 m	MPC · JPL
233192	2005 WD_{150}	—	November 28, 2005	Kitt Peak	Spacewatch	·	1.9 km	MPC · JPL
233193	2005 WX_{151}	—	November 28, 2005	Catalina	CSS	·	1.3 km	MPC · JPL
233194	2005 WH_{160}	—	November 30, 2005	Kitt Peak	Spacewatch	MAS	870 m	MPC · JPL
233195	2005 WL_{164}	—	November 29, 2005	Mount Lemmon	Mount Lemmon Survey	·	750 m	MPC · JPL
233196	2005 WU_{169}	—	November 30, 2005	Kitt Peak	Spacewatch	(2076)	1.4 km	MPC · JPL
233197	2005 WX_{170}	—	November 30, 2005	Kitt Peak	Spacewatch	·	1.3 km	MPC · JPL
233198	2005 WZ_{178}	—	November 28, 2005	Palomar	NEAT	·	2.0 km	MPC · JPL
233199	2005 WL_{186}	—	November 29, 2005	Mount Lemmon	Mount Lemmon Survey	MAS	1.2 km	MPC · JPL
233200	2005 WT_{189}	—	November 20, 2005	Catalina	CSS	·	3.3 km	MPC · JPL

== 233201–233300 ==
back to top

Designation			Discovery			Properties		Ref
Permanent	Provisional	Named after	Date	Site	Discoverer(s)	Category	Diam.	Ref
233201	2005 WR_{197}	—	November 21, 2005	Kitt Peak	Spacewatch	NYS	1.4 km	MPC · JPL
233202	2005 WN_{198}	—	November 25, 2005	Kitt Peak	Spacewatch	·	930 m	MPC · JPL
233203	2005 XF_{2}	—	December 1, 2005	Socorro	LINEAR	·	1.6 km	MPC · JPL
233204	2005 XQ_{11}	—	December 1, 2005	Kitt Peak	Spacewatch	·	1.1 km	MPC · JPL
233205	2005 XZ_{22}	—	December 2, 2005	Mount Lemmon	Mount Lemmon Survey	·	1.1 km	MPC · JPL
233206	2005 XJ_{27}	—	December 5, 2005	Junk Bond	D. Healy	·	1.1 km	MPC · JPL
233207	2005 XR_{57}	—	December 1, 2005	Mount Lemmon	Mount Lemmon Survey	·	1.1 km	MPC · JPL
233208	2005 XT_{61}	—	December 4, 2005	Kitt Peak	Spacewatch	·	2.1 km	MPC · JPL
233209	2005 XA_{62}	—	December 5, 2005	Kitt Peak	Spacewatch	·	1.4 km	MPC · JPL
233210	2005 XC_{62}	—	December 5, 2005	Socorro	LINEAR	·	1.1 km	MPC · JPL
233211	2005 XL_{65}	—	December 7, 2005	Kitt Peak	Spacewatch	·	2.1 km	MPC · JPL
233212	2005 XU_{65}	—	December 7, 2005	Kitt Peak	Spacewatch	·	1.3 km	MPC · JPL
233213	2005 XE_{73}	—	December 6, 2005	Kitt Peak	Spacewatch	·	1.4 km	MPC · JPL
233214 Gailoxton	2005 XT_{110}	Gailoxton	December 1, 2005	Kitt Peak	M. W. Buie	·	1.7 km	MPC · JPL
233215	2005 XO_{115}	—	December 10, 2005	Kitt Peak	Spacewatch	·	2.5 km	MPC · JPL
233216	2005 XW_{116}	—	December 2, 2005	Mount Lemmon	Mount Lemmon Survey	·	2.0 km	MPC · JPL
233217	2005 YM	—	December 20, 2005	Calvin-Rehoboth	Calvin College	·	1.5 km	MPC · JPL
233218	2005 YU_{9}	—	December 21, 2005	Kitt Peak	Spacewatch	·	1.4 km	MPC · JPL
233219	2005 YL_{11}	—	December 21, 2005	Kitt Peak	Spacewatch	NYS	1.6 km	MPC · JPL
233220	2005 YO_{12}	—	December 21, 2005	Kitt Peak	Spacewatch	NYS	1.6 km	MPC · JPL
233221	2005 YH_{13}	—	December 22, 2005	Kitt Peak	Spacewatch	MAS	1.1 km	MPC · JPL
233222	2005 YO_{13}	—	December 22, 2005	Kitt Peak	Spacewatch	·	1.3 km	MPC · JPL
233223	2005 YS_{26}	—	December 21, 2005	Catalina	CSS	HNS	2.6 km	MPC · JPL
233224	2005 YU_{26}	—	December 21, 2005	Catalina	CSS	·	1.5 km	MPC · JPL
233225	2005 YZ_{30}	—	December 22, 2005	Kitt Peak	Spacewatch	·	1.5 km	MPC · JPL
233226	2005 YZ_{34}	—	December 24, 2005	Kitt Peak	Spacewatch	·	3.5 km	MPC · JPL
233227	2005 YK_{38}	—	December 21, 2005	Catalina	CSS	·	2.1 km	MPC · JPL
233228	2005 YW_{38}	—	December 22, 2005	Cordell-Lorenz	Cordell-Lorenz	MAS	990 m	MPC · JPL
233229	2005 YD_{39}	—	December 22, 2005	Catalina	CSS	·	2.2 km	MPC · JPL
233230	2005 YQ_{45}	—	December 25, 2005	Kitt Peak	Spacewatch	·	1.6 km	MPC · JPL
233231	2005 YB_{46}	—	December 25, 2005	Kitt Peak	Spacewatch	·	1.7 km	MPC · JPL
233232	2005 YB_{47}	—	December 25, 2005	Kitt Peak	Spacewatch	NYS	1.8 km	MPC · JPL
233233	2005 YW_{48}	—	December 22, 2005	Kitt Peak	Spacewatch	NYS	1.6 km	MPC · JPL
233234	2005 YM_{52}	—	December 26, 2005	Mount Lemmon	Mount Lemmon Survey	·	2.3 km	MPC · JPL
233235	2005 YT_{58}	—	December 25, 2005	Kitt Peak	Spacewatch	MRX	1.4 km	MPC · JPL
233236	2005 YX_{61}	—	December 24, 2005	Kitt Peak	Spacewatch	MAS	1.1 km	MPC · JPL
233237	2005 YQ_{67}	—	December 26, 2005	Kitt Peak	Spacewatch	·	1.9 km	MPC · JPL
233238	2005 YS_{75}	—	December 24, 2005	Kitt Peak	Spacewatch	V	890 m	MPC · JPL
233239	2005 YL_{76}	—	December 24, 2005	Kitt Peak	Spacewatch	·	1.3 km	MPC · JPL
233240	2005 YB_{83}	—	December 24, 2005	Kitt Peak	Spacewatch	NYS	1.6 km	MPC · JPL
233241	2005 YC_{83}	—	December 24, 2005	Kitt Peak	Spacewatch	·	1.8 km	MPC · JPL
233242	2005 YD_{87}	—	December 25, 2005	Mount Lemmon	Mount Lemmon Survey	·	1.3 km	MPC · JPL
233243	2005 YB_{92}	—	December 27, 2005	Mount Lemmon	Mount Lemmon Survey	·	2.1 km	MPC · JPL
233244	2005 YL_{106}	—	December 25, 2005	Kitt Peak	Spacewatch	ERI	3.2 km	MPC · JPL
233245	2005 YG_{111}	—	December 25, 2005	Kitt Peak	Spacewatch	NYS	1.5 km	MPC · JPL
233246	2005 YY_{111}	—	December 25, 2005	Mount Lemmon	Mount Lemmon Survey	MAS	960 m	MPC · JPL
233247	2005 YA_{115}	—	December 25, 2005	Kitt Peak	Spacewatch	·	3.3 km	MPC · JPL
233248	2005 YC_{115}	—	December 25, 2005	Kitt Peak	Spacewatch	MIS	2.1 km	MPC · JPL
233249	2005 YS_{118}	—	December 26, 2005	Kitt Peak	Spacewatch	·	1.4 km	MPC · JPL
233250	2005 YF_{120}	—	December 27, 2005	Mount Lemmon	Mount Lemmon Survey	·	1.6 km	MPC · JPL
233251	2005 YO_{122}	—	December 24, 2005	Kitt Peak	Spacewatch	·	1.6 km	MPC · JPL
233252	2005 YS_{123}	—	December 24, 2005	Kitt Peak	Spacewatch	EUN	1.8 km	MPC · JPL
233253	2005 YF_{126}	—	December 26, 2005	Kitt Peak	Spacewatch	·	1.5 km	MPC · JPL
233254	2005 YH_{127}	—	December 28, 2005	Kitt Peak	Spacewatch	NYS	1.1 km	MPC · JPL
233255	2005 YB_{144}	—	December 28, 2005	Mount Lemmon	Mount Lemmon Survey	NYS	1.7 km	MPC · JPL
233256	2005 YZ_{151}	—	December 26, 2005	Mount Lemmon	Mount Lemmon Survey	·	1.8 km	MPC · JPL
233257	2005 YZ_{155}	—	December 25, 2005	Kitt Peak	Spacewatch	EOS	3.1 km	MPC · JPL
233258	2005 YA_{157}	—	December 27, 2005	Kitt Peak	Spacewatch	·	3.8 km	MPC · JPL
233259	2005 YP_{163}	—	December 28, 2005	Kitt Peak	Spacewatch	NYS	1.4 km	MPC · JPL
233260	2005 YH_{185}	—	December 27, 2005	Kitt Peak	Spacewatch	·	2.4 km	MPC · JPL
233261	2005 YU_{191}	—	December 30, 2005	Kitt Peak	Spacewatch	·	2.8 km	MPC · JPL
233262	2005 YD_{193}	—	December 30, 2005	Kitt Peak	Spacewatch	·	1.3 km	MPC · JPL
233263	2005 YE_{193}	—	December 30, 2005	Kitt Peak	Spacewatch	·	1.8 km	MPC · JPL
233264	2005 YP_{206}	—	December 27, 2005	Kitt Peak	Spacewatch	·	2.0 km	MPC · JPL
233265	2005 YR_{210}	—	December 24, 2005	Catalina	CSS	PHO	1.6 km	MPC · JPL
233266	2005 YT_{210}	—	December 24, 2005	Socorro	LINEAR	·	2.3 km	MPC · JPL
233267	2005 YA_{211}	—	December 25, 2005	Catalina	CSS	HNS	1.8 km	MPC · JPL
233268	2005 YT_{220}	—	December 29, 2005	Catalina	CSS	·	2.7 km	MPC · JPL
233269	2005 YF_{253}	—	December 29, 2005	Kitt Peak	Spacewatch	·	1.9 km	MPC · JPL
233270	2005 YF_{270}	—	December 27, 2005	Kitt Peak	Spacewatch	·	1.7 km	MPC · JPL
233271	2006 AP_{1}	—	January 2, 2006	Catalina	CSS	·	2.5 km	MPC · JPL
233272	2006 AY_{9}	—	January 4, 2006	Mount Lemmon	Mount Lemmon Survey	·	1.8 km	MPC · JPL
233273	2006 AT_{10}	—	January 4, 2006	Catalina	CSS	·	3.8 km	MPC · JPL
233274	2006 AK_{16}	—	January 4, 2006	Mount Lemmon	Mount Lemmon Survey	·	2.2 km	MPC · JPL
233275	2006 AB_{37}	—	January 4, 2006	Kitt Peak	Spacewatch	MAS	1.1 km	MPC · JPL
233276	2006 AK_{43}	—	January 6, 2006	Kitt Peak	Spacewatch	NYS	1.4 km	MPC · JPL
233277	2006 AX_{43}	—	January 7, 2006	Socorro	LINEAR	·	2.2 km	MPC · JPL
233278	2006 AC_{46}	—	January 5, 2006	Kitt Peak	Spacewatch	V	790 m	MPC · JPL
233279	2006 AK_{48}	—	January 8, 2006	Mount Lemmon	Mount Lemmon Survey	EUN	1.8 km	MPC · JPL
233280	2006 AZ_{60}	—	January 5, 2006	Kitt Peak	Spacewatch	·	1.3 km	MPC · JPL
233281	2006 AO_{77}	—	January 6, 2006	Mount Lemmon	Mount Lemmon Survey	·	1.6 km	MPC · JPL
233282	2006 AP_{79}	—	January 5, 2006	Anderson Mesa	LONEOS	JUN	1.4 km	MPC · JPL
233283	2006 AN_{85}	—	January 7, 2006	Anderson Mesa	LONEOS	·	3.4 km	MPC · JPL
233284	2006 AC_{90}	—	January 5, 2006	Mount Lemmon	Mount Lemmon Survey	MIS	2.5 km	MPC · JPL
233285	2006 AS_{90}	—	January 6, 2006	Kitt Peak	Spacewatch	TEL	2.3 km	MPC · JPL
233286	2006 AS_{93}	—	January 7, 2006	Mount Lemmon	Mount Lemmon Survey	·	2.0 km	MPC · JPL
233287	2006 AU_{93}	—	January 7, 2006	Mount Lemmon	Mount Lemmon Survey	·	3.0 km	MPC · JPL
233288	2006 AV_{93}	—	January 7, 2006	Mount Lemmon	Mount Lemmon Survey	MAR	1.9 km	MPC · JPL
233289	2006 AL_{96}	—	January 6, 2006	Anderson Mesa	LONEOS	GEF	1.9 km	MPC · JPL
233290	2006 AM_{96}	—	January 6, 2006	Catalina	CSS	·	1.6 km	MPC · JPL
233291	2006 AO_{97}	—	January 6, 2006	Anderson Mesa	LONEOS	·	2.1 km	MPC · JPL
233292 Brianschmidt	2006 BV	Brianschmidt	January 19, 2006	Vallemare Borbona	V. S. Casulli	·	1.2 km	MPC · JPL
233293	2006 BP_{1}	—	January 20, 2006	Kitt Peak	Spacewatch	·	1.6 km	MPC · JPL
233294	2006 BX_{1}	—	January 20, 2006	Kitt Peak	Spacewatch	·	1.8 km	MPC · JPL
233295	2006 BC_{7}	—	January 20, 2006	Kitt Peak	Spacewatch	·	1.1 km	MPC · JPL
233296	2006 BO_{10}	—	January 20, 2006	Kitt Peak	Spacewatch	·	1.0 km	MPC · JPL
233297	2006 BS_{20}	—	January 22, 2006	Mount Lemmon	Mount Lemmon Survey	NYS	1.6 km	MPC · JPL
233298	2006 BU_{24}	—	January 23, 2006	Mount Lemmon	Mount Lemmon Survey	MAS	990 m	MPC · JPL
233299	2006 BE_{29}	—	January 23, 2006	Mount Lemmon	Mount Lemmon Survey	·	3.2 km	MPC · JPL
233300	2006 BS_{29}	—	January 23, 2006	Mount Nyukasa	Japan Aerospace Exploration Agency	·	1.4 km	MPC · JPL

== 233301–233400 ==
back to top

Designation			Discovery			Properties		Ref
Permanent	Provisional	Named after	Date	Site	Discoverer(s)	Category	Diam.	Ref
233301	2006 BO_{39}	—	January 19, 2006	Catalina	CSS	·	2.2 km	MPC · JPL
233302	2006 BK_{45}	—	January 23, 2006	Mount Lemmon	Mount Lemmon Survey	·	2.0 km	MPC · JPL
233303	2006 BG_{46}	—	January 23, 2006	Mount Lemmon	Mount Lemmon Survey	·	1.4 km	MPC · JPL
233304	2006 BW_{56}	—	January 22, 2006	Mount Lemmon	Mount Lemmon Survey	AGN	1.7 km	MPC · JPL
233305	2006 BD_{69}	—	January 23, 2006	Kitt Peak	Spacewatch	·	3.8 km	MPC · JPL
233306	2006 BL_{72}	—	January 23, 2006	Kitt Peak	Spacewatch	·	3.1 km	MPC · JPL
233307	2006 BP_{72}	—	January 23, 2006	Kitt Peak	Spacewatch	·	1.2 km	MPC · JPL
233308	2006 BP_{78}	—	January 23, 2006	Catalina	CSS	·	1.8 km	MPC · JPL
233309	2006 BA_{79}	—	January 23, 2006	Kitt Peak	Spacewatch	·	1.5 km	MPC · JPL
233310	2006 BR_{87}	—	January 25, 2006	Kitt Peak	Spacewatch	·	1.9 km	MPC · JPL
233311	2006 BC_{91}	—	January 26, 2006	Kitt Peak	Spacewatch	·	2.0 km	MPC · JPL
233312	2006 BH_{129}	—	January 26, 2006	Mount Lemmon	Mount Lemmon Survey	AGN	1.7 km	MPC · JPL
233313	2006 BM_{129}	—	January 26, 2006	Mount Lemmon	Mount Lemmon Survey	·	1.6 km	MPC · JPL
233314	2006 BL_{130}	—	January 26, 2006	Kitt Peak	Spacewatch	·	1.7 km	MPC · JPL
233315	2006 BW_{132}	—	January 26, 2006	Kitt Peak	Spacewatch	·	1.7 km	MPC · JPL
233316	2006 BO_{135}	—	January 27, 2006	Mount Lemmon	Mount Lemmon Survey	·	1.5 km	MPC · JPL
233317	2006 BW_{144}	—	January 23, 2006	Catalina	CSS	·	4.0 km	MPC · JPL
233318	2006 BZ_{165}	—	January 26, 2006	Mount Lemmon	Mount Lemmon Survey	·	1.6 km	MPC · JPL
233319	2006 BY_{168}	—	January 26, 2006	Mount Lemmon	Mount Lemmon Survey	WIT	1.3 km	MPC · JPL
233320	2006 BT_{183}	—	January 27, 2006	Mount Lemmon	Mount Lemmon Survey	·	1.2 km	MPC · JPL
233321	2006 BP_{194}	—	January 30, 2006	Kitt Peak	Spacewatch	ERI	2.7 km	MPC · JPL
233322	2006 BD_{199}	—	January 30, 2006	Kitt Peak	Spacewatch	·	1.2 km	MPC · JPL
233323	2006 BL_{212}	—	January 31, 2006	Kitt Peak	Spacewatch	RAF	1.2 km	MPC · JPL
233324	2006 BP_{219}	—	January 28, 2006	Catalina	CSS	·	3.0 km	MPC · JPL
233325	2006 BF_{223}	—	January 30, 2006	Kitt Peak	Spacewatch	NYS	1.8 km	MPC · JPL
233326	2006 BU_{247}	—	January 31, 2006	Kitt Peak	Spacewatch	·	5.7 km	MPC · JPL
233327	2006 BM_{251}	—	January 31, 2006	Kitt Peak	Spacewatch	·	1.5 km	MPC · JPL
233328	2006 BE_{255}	—	January 31, 2006	Kitt Peak	Spacewatch	(5)	1.4 km	MPC · JPL
233329	2006 BC_{266}	—	January 31, 2006	Kitt Peak	Spacewatch	·	5.2 km	MPC · JPL
233330	2006 BB_{279}	—	January 30, 2006	Kitt Peak	Spacewatch	·	1.5 km	MPC · JPL
233331	2006 BP_{282}	—	January 23, 2006	Kitt Peak	Spacewatch	·	1.3 km	MPC · JPL
233332	2006 CS_{10}	—	February 8, 2006	Wrightwood	J. W. Young	HNS	1.9 km	MPC · JPL
233333	2006 CB_{26}	—	February 2, 2006	Kitt Peak	Spacewatch	NYS	1.5 km	MPC · JPL
233334	2006 CO_{30}	—	February 2, 2006	Kitt Peak	Spacewatch	·	1.7 km	MPC · JPL
233335	2006 CN_{40}	—	February 2, 2006	Mount Lemmon	Mount Lemmon Survey	·	2.7 km	MPC · JPL
233336	2006 CK_{50}	—	February 3, 2006	Mount Lemmon	Mount Lemmon Survey	·	1.8 km	MPC · JPL
233337	2006 CL_{59}	—	February 6, 2006	Anderson Mesa	LONEOS	·	2.8 km	MPC · JPL
233338	2006 CM_{59}	—	February 6, 2006	Mount Lemmon	Mount Lemmon Survey	MAS	1.5 km	MPC · JPL
233339	2006 DT	—	February 20, 2006	Marly	Observatoire Naef	·	2.1 km	MPC · JPL
233340	2006 DA_{10}	—	February 21, 2006	Catalina	CSS	·	2.3 km	MPC · JPL
233341	2006 DK_{10}	—	February 20, 2006	Kitt Peak	Spacewatch	·	2.0 km	MPC · JPL
233342	2006 DQ_{10}	—	February 20, 2006	Catalina	CSS	·	3.2 km	MPC · JPL
233343	2006 DH_{13}	—	February 22, 2006	Catalina	CSS	·	3.0 km	MPC · JPL
233344	2006 DF_{19}	—	February 20, 2006	Kitt Peak	Spacewatch	(12739)	2.3 km	MPC · JPL
233345	2006 DU_{20}	—	February 20, 2006	Catalina	CSS	·	1.9 km	MPC · JPL
233346	2006 DL_{28}	—	February 20, 2006	Kitt Peak	Spacewatch	·	1.5 km	MPC · JPL
233347	2006 DM_{32}	—	February 20, 2006	Mount Lemmon	Mount Lemmon Survey	·	2.2 km	MPC · JPL
233348	2006 DW_{33}	—	February 20, 2006	Kitt Peak	Spacewatch	·	2.2 km	MPC · JPL
233349	2006 DM_{41}	—	February 23, 2006	Anderson Mesa	LONEOS	MAR	1.9 km	MPC · JPL
233350	2006 DT_{61}	—	February 24, 2006	Kitt Peak	Spacewatch	JUN	2.3 km	MPC · JPL
233351	2006 DU_{61}	—	February 24, 2006	Palomar	NEAT	·	1.9 km	MPC · JPL
233352	2006 DJ_{71}	—	February 21, 2006	Mount Lemmon	Mount Lemmon Survey	·	3.5 km	MPC · JPL
233353	2006 DX_{71}	—	February 21, 2006	Mount Lemmon	Mount Lemmon Survey	·	1.6 km	MPC · JPL
233354	2006 DA_{72}	—	February 21, 2006	Mount Lemmon	Mount Lemmon Survey	·	1.5 km	MPC · JPL
233355	2006 DX_{83}	—	February 24, 2006	Kitt Peak	Spacewatch	·	1.5 km	MPC · JPL
233356	2006 DQ_{86}	—	February 24, 2006	Kitt Peak	Spacewatch	·	1.1 km	MPC · JPL
233357	2006 DR_{92}	—	February 24, 2006	Socorro	LINEAR	·	2.5 km	MPC · JPL
233358	2006 DT_{94}	—	February 24, 2006	Kitt Peak	Spacewatch	·	2.4 km	MPC · JPL
233359	2006 DA_{96}	—	February 24, 2006	Kitt Peak	Spacewatch	·	1.8 km	MPC · JPL
233360	2006 DE_{97}	—	February 24, 2006	Mount Lemmon	Mount Lemmon Survey	·	1.9 km	MPC · JPL
233361	2006 DO_{106}	—	February 25, 2006	Mount Lemmon	Mount Lemmon Survey	AST	1.9 km	MPC · JPL
233362	2006 DZ_{117}	—	February 27, 2006	Kitt Peak	Spacewatch	·	1.4 km	MPC · JPL
233363	2006 DA_{124}	—	February 24, 2006	Mount Lemmon	Mount Lemmon Survey	·	1.8 km	MPC · JPL
233364	2006 DE_{124}	—	February 24, 2006	Mount Lemmon	Mount Lemmon Survey	·	2.1 km	MPC · JPL
233365	2006 DT_{124}	—	February 24, 2006	Mount Lemmon	Mount Lemmon Survey	(17392)	1.8 km	MPC · JPL
233366	2006 DH_{138}	—	February 25, 2006	Kitt Peak	Spacewatch	·	2.1 km	MPC · JPL
233367	2006 DX_{144}	—	February 25, 2006	Mount Lemmon	Mount Lemmon Survey	·	1.6 km	MPC · JPL
233368	2006 DH_{152}	—	February 25, 2006	Kitt Peak	Spacewatch	·	3.5 km	MPC · JPL
233369	2006 DU_{152}	—	February 25, 2006	Kitt Peak	Spacewatch	·	1.8 km	MPC · JPL
233370	2006 DL_{161}	—	February 27, 2006	Kitt Peak	Spacewatch	·	1.2 km	MPC · JPL
233371	2006 DM_{169}	—	February 27, 2006	Kitt Peak	Spacewatch	·	3.1 km	MPC · JPL
233372	2006 DQ_{182}	—	February 27, 2006	Mount Lemmon	Mount Lemmon Survey	·	1.3 km	MPC · JPL
233373	2006 DM_{188}	—	February 27, 2006	Kitt Peak	Spacewatch	·	3.3 km	MPC · JPL
233374	2006 DW_{188}	—	February 27, 2006	Kitt Peak	Spacewatch	(5)	1.2 km	MPC · JPL
233375	2006 DH_{190}	—	February 27, 2006	Kitt Peak	Spacewatch	(5)	2.0 km	MPC · JPL
233376	2006 DY_{193}	—	February 28, 2006	Mount Lemmon	Mount Lemmon Survey	·	1.2 km	MPC · JPL
233377	2006 DZ_{197}	—	February 25, 2006	Catalina	CSS	·	2.8 km	MPC · JPL
233378	2006 DP_{199}	—	February 23, 2006	Anderson Mesa	LONEOS	·	1.8 km	MPC · JPL
233379	2006 DH_{210}	—	February 20, 2006	Kitt Peak	Spacewatch	·	1.6 km	MPC · JPL
233380	2006 DJ_{212}	—	February 26, 2006	Kitt Peak	Spacewatch	·	2.4 km	MPC · JPL
233381	2006 DY_{214}	—	February 24, 2006	Kitt Peak	Spacewatch	·	1.8 km	MPC · JPL
233382	2006 DE_{217}	—	February 20, 2006	Mount Lemmon	Mount Lemmon Survey	·	1.9 km	MPC · JPL
233383 Assisneto	2006 EP	Assisneto	March 4, 2006	Nogales	J.-C. Merlin	·	1.2 km	MPC · JPL
233384	2006 EG_{5}	—	March 2, 2006	Kitt Peak	Spacewatch	·	2.7 km	MPC · JPL
233385	2006 EH_{10}	—	March 2, 2006	Kitt Peak	Spacewatch	·	3.7 km	MPC · JPL
233386	2006 EH_{19}	—	March 2, 2006	Kitt Peak	Spacewatch	·	2.1 km	MPC · JPL
233387	2006 EP_{23}	—	March 3, 2006	Kitt Peak	Spacewatch	·	1.2 km	MPC · JPL
233388	2006 EP_{27}	—	March 3, 2006	Mount Lemmon	Mount Lemmon Survey	·	1.6 km	MPC · JPL
233389	2006 EL_{33}	—	March 3, 2006	Mount Lemmon	Mount Lemmon Survey	·	2.2 km	MPC · JPL
233390	2006 EL_{34}	—	March 3, 2006	Kitt Peak	Spacewatch	·	4.2 km	MPC · JPL
233391	2006 EU_{47}	—	March 4, 2006	Kitt Peak	Spacewatch	EUN	1.6 km	MPC · JPL
233392	2006 FP_{6}	—	March 23, 2006	Mount Lemmon	Mount Lemmon Survey	·	2.2 km	MPC · JPL
233393	2006 FP_{17}	—	March 23, 2006	Kitt Peak	Spacewatch	·	2.0 km	MPC · JPL
233394	2006 FT_{17}	—	March 23, 2006	Kitt Peak	Spacewatch	·	2.5 km	MPC · JPL
233395	2006 FH_{22}	—	March 24, 2006	Mount Lemmon	Mount Lemmon Survey	(5)	1.5 km	MPC · JPL
233396	2006 FJ_{26}	—	March 24, 2006	Mount Lemmon	Mount Lemmon Survey	·	1.8 km	MPC · JPL
233397	2006 FK_{26}	—	March 24, 2006	Mount Lemmon	Mount Lemmon Survey	·	2.1 km	MPC · JPL
233398	2006 FW_{29}	—	March 24, 2006	Mount Lemmon	Mount Lemmon Survey	·	2.7 km	MPC · JPL
233399	2006 FN_{34}	—	March 24, 2006	Siding Spring	SSS	·	6.8 km	MPC · JPL
233400	2006 FK_{37}	—	March 24, 2006	Catalina	CSS	ADE	4.2 km	MPC · JPL

== 233401–233500 ==
back to top

Designation			Discovery			Properties		Ref
Permanent	Provisional	Named after	Date	Site	Discoverer(s)	Category	Diam.	Ref
233401	2006 FF_{39}	—	March 23, 2006	Mount Lemmon	Mount Lemmon Survey	·	2.2 km	MPC · JPL
233402	2006 FL_{42}	—	March 26, 2006	Mount Lemmon	Mount Lemmon Survey	·	1.8 km	MPC · JPL
233403	2006 FF_{45}	—	March 24, 2006	Mount Lemmon	Mount Lemmon Survey	·	2.1 km	MPC · JPL
233404	2006 FT_{46}	—	March 23, 2006	Socorro	LINEAR	·	3.9 km	MPC · JPL
233405	2006 FO_{48}	—	March 24, 2006	Anderson Mesa	LONEOS	·	1.6 km	MPC · JPL
233406	2006 FX_{52}	—	March 25, 2006	Kitt Peak	Spacewatch	·	3.6 km	MPC · JPL
233407	2006 GS_{4}	—	April 2, 2006	Kitt Peak	Spacewatch	(5)	1.6 km	MPC · JPL
233408	2006 GY_{11}	—	April 2, 2006	Kitt Peak	Spacewatch	·	2.7 km	MPC · JPL
233409	2006 GJ_{17}	—	April 2, 2006	Kitt Peak	Spacewatch	·	1.8 km	MPC · JPL
233410	2006 GQ_{19}	—	April 2, 2006	Kitt Peak	Spacewatch	·	3.8 km	MPC · JPL
233411	2006 GM_{21}	—	April 2, 2006	Mount Lemmon	Mount Lemmon Survey	·	1.7 km	MPC · JPL
233412	2006 GL_{30}	—	April 2, 2006	Mount Lemmon	Mount Lemmon Survey	KOR	1.8 km	MPC · JPL
233413	2006 GH_{38}	—	April 2, 2006	Vail-Jarnac	Jarnac	·	2.9 km	MPC · JPL
233414	2006 GE_{40}	—	April 6, 2006	Socorro	LINEAR	·	1.9 km	MPC · JPL
233415	2006 GA_{42}	—	April 8, 2006	Catalina	CSS	·	3.4 km	MPC · JPL
233416	2006 GJ_{47}	—	April 9, 2006	Mount Lemmon	Mount Lemmon Survey	DOR	3.1 km	MPC · JPL
233417	2006 GE_{50}	—	April 8, 2006	Siding Spring	SSS	·	3.6 km	MPC · JPL
233418	2006 GO_{50}	—	April 9, 2006	Siding Spring	SSS	·	2.0 km	MPC · JPL
233419	2006 GZ_{52}	—	April 8, 2006	Socorro	LINEAR	·	2.6 km	MPC · JPL
233420	2006 HE	—	April 18, 2006	Kitt Peak	Spacewatch	AGN	1.5 km	MPC · JPL
233421	2006 HW_{1}	—	April 18, 2006	Palomar	NEAT	NEM	3.7 km	MPC · JPL
233422	2006 HS_{7}	—	April 19, 2006	Palomar	NEAT	·	3.0 km	MPC · JPL
233423	2006 HW_{7}	—	April 20, 2006	Mayhill	Lowe, A.	·	1.4 km	MPC · JPL
233424	2006 HP_{9}	—	April 19, 2006	Kitt Peak	Spacewatch	·	2.7 km	MPC · JPL
233425	2006 HR_{12}	—	April 19, 2006	Mount Lemmon	Mount Lemmon Survey	·	2.1 km	MPC · JPL
233426	2006 HX_{15}	—	April 20, 2006	Kitt Peak	Spacewatch	HOF	3.0 km	MPC · JPL
233427	2006 HQ_{31}	—	April 19, 2006	Kitt Peak	Spacewatch	NEM	2.8 km	MPC · JPL
233428	2006 HV_{31}	—	April 19, 2006	Kitt Peak	Spacewatch	·	4.8 km	MPC · JPL
233429	2006 HN_{40}	—	April 21, 2006	Catalina	CSS	·	2.7 km	MPC · JPL
233430	2006 HZ_{41}	—	April 21, 2006	Kitt Peak	Spacewatch	·	2.8 km	MPC · JPL
233431	2006 HU_{44}	—	April 25, 2006	Kitt Peak	Spacewatch	KOR	1.9 km	MPC · JPL
233432	2006 HS_{53}	—	April 19, 2006	Catalina	CSS	·	3.2 km	MPC · JPL
233433	2006 HY_{54}	—	April 21, 2006	Catalina	CSS	·	3.2 km	MPC · JPL
233434	2006 HZ_{55}	—	April 26, 2006	Catalina	CSS	·	3.6 km	MPC · JPL
233435	2006 HK_{58}	—	April 30, 2006	Kanab	Sheridan, E.	MRX	1.0 km	MPC · JPL
233436	2006 HN_{65}	—	April 24, 2006	Kitt Peak	Spacewatch	·	2.7 km	MPC · JPL
233437	2006 HF_{69}	—	April 24, 2006	Mount Lemmon	Mount Lemmon Survey	AGN	1.9 km	MPC · JPL
233438	2006 HU_{70}	—	April 25, 2006	Kitt Peak	Spacewatch	·	2.7 km	MPC · JPL
233439	2006 HJ_{72}	—	April 25, 2006	Kitt Peak	Spacewatch	HYG	4.1 km	MPC · JPL
233440	2006 HZ_{73}	—	April 25, 2006	Kitt Peak	Spacewatch	·	2.5 km	MPC · JPL
233441	2006 HE_{78}	—	April 26, 2006	Kitt Peak	Spacewatch	·	3.9 km	MPC · JPL
233442	2006 HR_{79}	—	April 26, 2006	Kitt Peak	Spacewatch	·	2.6 km	MPC · JPL
233443	2006 HC_{87}	—	April 30, 2006	Kitt Peak	Spacewatch	·	2.2 km	MPC · JPL
233444	2006 HP_{93}	—	April 29, 2006	Kitt Peak	Spacewatch	·	2.9 km	MPC · JPL
233445	2006 HT_{102}	—	April 30, 2006	Kitt Peak	Spacewatch	·	3.5 km	MPC · JPL
233446	2006 HQ_{106}	—	April 30, 2006	Kitt Peak	Spacewatch	(13314)	3.7 km	MPC · JPL
233447	2006 HU_{107}	—	April 30, 2006	Kitt Peak	Spacewatch	·	3.3 km	MPC · JPL
233448	2006 HY_{108}	—	April 30, 2006	Catalina	CSS	·	3.7 km	MPC · JPL
233449	2006 HS_{110}	—	April 30, 2006	Kitt Peak	Spacewatch	·	3.6 km	MPC · JPL
233450	2006 HH_{111}	—	April 26, 2006	Siding Spring	SSS	·	2.4 km	MPC · JPL
233451	2006 HR_{115}	—	April 26, 2006	Kitt Peak	Spacewatch	EUN	1.8 km	MPC · JPL
233452	2006 JT_{2}	—	May 2, 2006	Mount Lemmon	Mount Lemmon Survey	KOR	1.6 km	MPC · JPL
233453	2006 JV_{15}	—	May 2, 2006	Mount Lemmon	Mount Lemmon Survey	KOR	1.5 km	MPC · JPL
233454	2006 JD_{16}	—	May 2, 2006	Mount Lemmon	Mount Lemmon Survey	AST	2.8 km	MPC · JPL
233455	2006 JC_{21}	—	May 2, 2006	Kitt Peak	Spacewatch	GEF	1.8 km	MPC · JPL
233456	2006 JS_{38}	—	May 6, 2006	Kitt Peak	Spacewatch	EUN	1.8 km	MPC · JPL
233457	2006 JM_{42}	—	May 2, 2006	Kitt Peak	Spacewatch	·	3.4 km	MPC · JPL
233458	2006 JW_{55}	—	May 1, 2006	Catalina	CSS	·	2.3 km	MPC · JPL
233459 Gregquicke	2006 JJ_{62}	Gregquicke	May 1, 2006	Kitt Peak	M. W. Buie	·	5.6 km	MPC · JPL
233460	2006 KL_{2}	—	May 18, 2006	Palomar	NEAT	·	2.3 km	MPC · JPL
233461	2006 KF_{10}	—	May 19, 2006	Mount Lemmon	Mount Lemmon Survey	·	3.1 km	MPC · JPL
233462	2006 KV_{13}	—	May 20, 2006	Kitt Peak	Spacewatch	EOS	3.1 km	MPC · JPL
233463	2006 KF_{16}	—	May 20, 2006	Palomar	NEAT	·	4.2 km	MPC · JPL
233464	2006 KD_{18}	—	May 21, 2006	Kitt Peak	Spacewatch	·	4.7 km	MPC · JPL
233465	2006 KZ_{34}	—	May 20, 2006	Kitt Peak	Spacewatch	KOR	1.7 km	MPC · JPL
233466	2006 KK_{50}	—	May 21, 2006	Kitt Peak	Spacewatch	KOR	1.5 km	MPC · JPL
233467	2006 KK_{73}	—	May 23, 2006	Kitt Peak	Spacewatch	·	2.6 km	MPC · JPL
233468	2006 KL_{79}	—	May 25, 2006	Mount Lemmon	Mount Lemmon Survey	·	2.9 km	MPC · JPL
233469	2006 KQ_{89}	—	May 29, 2006	Mayhill	Lowe, A.	·	2.3 km	MPC · JPL
233470	2006 KT_{109}	—	May 31, 2006	Mount Lemmon	Mount Lemmon Survey	·	3.3 km	MPC · JPL
233471	2006 KM_{110}	—	May 31, 2006	Mount Lemmon	Mount Lemmon Survey	·	2.9 km	MPC · JPL
233472 Moorcroft	2006 KB_{143}	Moorcroft	May 25, 2006	Mauna Kea	P. A. Wiegert	·	1.9 km	MPC · JPL
233473	2006 LJ_{7}	—	June 15, 2006	Siding Spring	SSS	·	4.3 km	MPC · JPL
233474	2006 MK_{4}	—	June 17, 2006	Kitt Peak	Spacewatch	GEF	1.7 km	MPC · JPL
233475	2006 PQ_{25}	—	August 13, 2006	Palomar	NEAT	·	5.0 km	MPC · JPL
233476	2006 QJ_{39}	—	August 19, 2006	Anderson Mesa	LONEOS	HYG	4.4 km	MPC · JPL
233477	2006 RV_{78}	—	September 15, 2006	Kitt Peak	Spacewatch	URS	4.5 km	MPC · JPL
233478	2006 SD_{7}	—	September 18, 2006	Siding Spring	SSS	H	920 m	MPC · JPL
233479	2006 SV_{16}	—	September 17, 2006	Kitt Peak	Spacewatch	·	6.6 km	MPC · JPL
233480	2006 SF_{20}	—	September 16, 2006	Catalina	CSS	·	6.7 km	MPC · JPL
233481	2006 SB_{29}	—	September 17, 2006	Kitt Peak	Spacewatch	HYG	4.7 km	MPC · JPL
233482	2006 SD_{147}	—	September 19, 2006	Kitt Peak	Spacewatch	·	5.8 km	MPC · JPL
233483	2006 SC_{352}	—	September 30, 2006	Catalina	CSS	·	6.1 km	MPC · JPL
233484	2006 SF_{360}	—	September 30, 2006	Kitt Peak	Spacewatch	·	6.4 km	MPC · JPL
233485	2006 TB_{74}	—	October 11, 2006	Palomar	NEAT	·	4.8 km	MPC · JPL
233486 Thankároly	2006 UF_{1}	Thankároly	October 16, 2006	Piszkéstető	K. Sárneczky, Kuli, Z.	·	6.0 km	MPC · JPL
233487	2006 XA_{19}	—	December 11, 2006	Kitt Peak	Spacewatch	EUN	2.4 km	MPC · JPL
233488 Cosandey	2006 YG	Cosandey	December 16, 2006	Vicques	M. Ory	H	890 m	MPC · JPL
233489	2007 AM_{25}	—	January 15, 2007	Catalina	CSS	H	910 m	MPC · JPL
233490	2007 BT_{80}	—	January 17, 2007	Kitt Peak	Spacewatch	·	970 m	MPC · JPL
233491	2007 CL_{5}	—	February 7, 2007	Kitt Peak	Spacewatch	·	850 m	MPC · JPL
233492	2007 CK_{21}	—	February 6, 2007	Palomar	NEAT	·	1.7 km	MPC · JPL
233493	2007 CJ_{23}	—	February 7, 2007	Catalina	CSS	·	1.3 km	MPC · JPL
233494	2007 CW_{26}	—	February 12, 2007	Junk Bond	D. Healy	·	970 m	MPC · JPL
233495	2007 DF_{48}	—	February 21, 2007	Mount Lemmon	Mount Lemmon Survey	·	3.6 km	MPC · JPL
233496	2007 DS_{50}	—	February 17, 2007	Kitt Peak	Spacewatch	·	800 m	MPC · JPL
233497	2007 DQ_{90}	—	February 23, 2007	Kitt Peak	Spacewatch	·	1.8 km	MPC · JPL
233498	2007 EC_{14}	—	March 9, 2007	Kitt Peak	Spacewatch	·	1.1 km	MPC · JPL
233499	2007 ER_{15}	—	March 9, 2007	Kitt Peak	Spacewatch	·	1.0 km	MPC · JPL
233500	2007 EV_{23}	—	March 10, 2007	Mount Lemmon	Mount Lemmon Survey	NYS	1.4 km	MPC · JPL

== 233501–233600 ==
back to top

Designation			Discovery			Properties		Ref
Permanent	Provisional	Named after	Date	Site	Discoverer(s)	Category	Diam.	Ref
233501	2007 EQ_{27}	—	March 9, 2007	Kitt Peak	Spacewatch	·	1.4 km	MPC · JPL
233502	2007 EC_{32}	—	March 10, 2007	Kitt Peak	Spacewatch	·	860 m	MPC · JPL
233503	2007 EM_{51}	—	March 10, 2007	Mount Lemmon	Mount Lemmon Survey	·	2.8 km	MPC · JPL
233504	2007 EA_{75}	—	March 10, 2007	Kitt Peak	Spacewatch	·	830 m	MPC · JPL
233505	2007 EK_{82}	—	March 11, 2007	Mount Lemmon	Mount Lemmon Survey	·	1.1 km	MPC · JPL
233506	2007 EW_{102}	—	March 11, 2007	Kitt Peak	Spacewatch	AGN	1.8 km	MPC · JPL
233507	2007 ED_{142}	—	March 12, 2007	Kitt Peak	Spacewatch	·	1.1 km	MPC · JPL
233508	2007 ET_{160}	—	March 14, 2007	Catalina	CSS	·	960 m	MPC · JPL
233509	2007 EB_{161}	—	March 14, 2007	Catalina	CSS	·	1.2 km	MPC · JPL
233510	2007 EK_{168}	—	March 13, 2007	Kitt Peak	Spacewatch	·	950 m	MPC · JPL
233511	2007 EE_{181}	—	March 14, 2007	Kitt Peak	Spacewatch	·	850 m	MPC · JPL
233512	2007 EU_{184}	—	March 13, 2007	Catalina	CSS	·	1.4 km	MPC · JPL
233513	2007 EM_{204}	—	March 11, 2007	Kitt Peak	Spacewatch	·	1.2 km	MPC · JPL
233514	2007 EY_{210}	—	March 8, 2007	Palomar	NEAT	·	820 m	MPC · JPL
233515	2007 FC_{13}	—	March 19, 2007	Catalina	CSS	·	1.1 km	MPC · JPL
233516	2007 FZ_{32}	—	March 20, 2007	Kitt Peak	Spacewatch	·	1.1 km	MPC · JPL
233517	2007 GP_{14}	—	April 11, 2007	Kitt Peak	Spacewatch	V	830 m	MPC · JPL
233518	2007 GT_{27}	—	April 11, 2007	Catalina	CSS	·	8.8 km	MPC · JPL
233519	2007 GX_{29}	—	April 14, 2007	Kitt Peak	Spacewatch	KON	3.4 km	MPC · JPL
233520	2007 GW_{40}	—	April 14, 2007	Kitt Peak	Spacewatch	·	960 m	MPC · JPL
233521	2007 GU_{44}	—	April 14, 2007	Kitt Peak	Spacewatch	·	1.4 km	MPC · JPL
233522 Moye	2007 HB_{4}	Moye	April 18, 2007	Pises	Pises	·	1.7 km	MPC · JPL
233523	2007 HD_{7}	—	April 16, 2007	Socorro	LINEAR	·	3.3 km	MPC · JPL
233524	2007 HK_{11}	—	April 18, 2007	Kitt Peak	Spacewatch	·	830 m	MPC · JPL
233525	2007 HM_{14}	—	April 19, 2007	Kitt Peak	Spacewatch	·	1.6 km	MPC · JPL
233526	2007 HA_{26}	—	April 18, 2007	Kitt Peak	Spacewatch	·	820 m	MPC · JPL
233527	2007 HU_{31}	—	April 19, 2007	Kitt Peak	Spacewatch	HOF	3.3 km	MPC · JPL
233528	2007 HY_{32}	—	April 19, 2007	Mount Lemmon	Mount Lemmon Survey	·	6.2 km	MPC · JPL
233529	2007 HJ_{35}	—	April 19, 2007	Kitt Peak	Spacewatch	·	1.4 km	MPC · JPL
233530	2007 HP_{43}	—	April 22, 2007	Mount Lemmon	Mount Lemmon Survey	EOS	3.3 km	MPC · JPL
233531	2007 HM_{61}	—	April 20, 2007	Kitt Peak	Spacewatch	·	1.4 km	MPC · JPL
233532	2007 HA_{68}	—	April 23, 2007	Kitt Peak	Spacewatch	·	1.7 km	MPC · JPL
233533	2007 HC_{68}	—	April 23, 2007	Kitt Peak	Spacewatch	·	1.8 km	MPC · JPL
233534	2007 HN_{74}	—	April 22, 2007	Kitt Peak	Spacewatch	NYS	1.1 km	MPC · JPL
233535	2007 HU_{78}	—	April 23, 2007	Catalina	CSS	MAS	940 m	MPC · JPL
233536	2007 HT_{79}	—	April 23, 2007	Kitt Peak	Spacewatch	·	2.0 km	MPC · JPL
233537	2007 HR_{85}	—	April 24, 2007	Kitt Peak	Spacewatch	NYS	1.4 km	MPC · JPL
233538	2007 HJ_{95}	—	April 25, 2007	Kitt Peak	Spacewatch	·	5.2 km	MPC · JPL
233539	2007 HW_{97}	—	April 25, 2007	Kitt Peak	Spacewatch	V	1.0 km	MPC · JPL
233540	2007 JS_{12}	—	May 7, 2007	Kitt Peak	Spacewatch	·	5.6 km	MPC · JPL
233541	2007 JQ_{15}	—	May 10, 2007	Mount Lemmon	Mount Lemmon Survey	·	5.3 km	MPC · JPL
233542	2007 JY_{18}	—	May 9, 2007	Kitt Peak	Spacewatch	·	1.2 km	MPC · JPL
233543	2007 JJ_{21}	—	May 12, 2007	Tiki	S. F. Hönig, Teamo, N.	·	1.1 km	MPC · JPL
233544 Jinyaqiu	2007 JY_{22}	Jinyaqiu	May 11, 2007	Lulin	LUSS	·	2.1 km	MPC · JPL
233545	2007 JU_{25}	—	May 9, 2007	Kitt Peak	Spacewatch	·	4.3 km	MPC · JPL
233546	2007 JN_{26}	—	May 9, 2007	Kitt Peak	Spacewatch	·	1.2 km	MPC · JPL
233547 Luxun	2007 JR_{27}	Luxun	May 9, 2007	Lulin	Q. Ye, Shih, C.-Y.	·	3.2 km	MPC · JPL
233548	2007 JW_{28}	—	May 10, 2007	Kitt Peak	Spacewatch	·	1.0 km	MPC · JPL
233549	2007 JP_{30}	—	May 11, 2007	Mount Lemmon	Mount Lemmon Survey	·	1.2 km	MPC · JPL
233550	2007 JC_{31}	—	May 12, 2007	Kitt Peak	Spacewatch	·	3.8 km	MPC · JPL
233551	2007 LD_{13}	—	June 9, 2007	Kitt Peak	Spacewatch	·	2.8 km	MPC · JPL
233552	2007 LC_{17}	—	June 10, 2007	Kitt Peak	Spacewatch	V	910 m	MPC · JPL
233553	2007 MO_{13}	—	June 17, 2007	Kitt Peak	Spacewatch	·	1.7 km	MPC · JPL
233554	2007 MF_{24}	—	June 23, 2007	Tiki	Teamo, N.	·	4.6 km	MPC · JPL
233555	2007 NT_{3}	—	July 12, 2007	Reedy Creek	J. Broughton	NYS ·	2.2 km	MPC · JPL
233556	2007 NX_{3}	—	July 13, 2007	Reedy Creek	J. Broughton	PHO	1.5 km	MPC · JPL
233557	2007 NA_{5}	—	July 15, 2007	Reedy Creek	J. Broughton	·	3.1 km	MPC · JPL
233558	2007 OF_{5}	—	July 23, 2007	Tiki	S. F. Hönig, Teamo, N.	KOR	1.9 km	MPC · JPL
233559 Pizzetti	2007 PJ	Pizzetti	August 4, 2007	Lumezzane	Marinello, W., M. Micheli	·	3.2 km	MPC · JPL
233560	2007 PZ	—	August 4, 2007	Reedy Creek	J. Broughton	·	2.5 km	MPC · JPL
233561	2007 PZ_{1}	—	August 6, 2007	Tiki	Teamo, N., Pelle, J. C.	KOR	1.8 km	MPC · JPL
233562	2007 PG_{6}	—	August 8, 2007	Tiki	Teamo, N., Pelle, J. C.	NYS	1.7 km	MPC · JPL
233563	2007 PM_{6}	—	August 7, 2007	Reedy Creek	J. Broughton	·	2.5 km	MPC · JPL
233564	2007 PR_{11}	—	August 11, 2007	Anderson Mesa	LONEOS	·	1.9 km	MPC · JPL
233565	2007 PD_{13}	—	August 8, 2007	Socorro	LINEAR	·	6.4 km	MPC · JPL
233566	2007 PT_{13}	—	August 8, 2007	Socorro	LINEAR	EUP	6.7 km	MPC · JPL
233567	2007 PU_{15}	—	August 8, 2007	Socorro	LINEAR	GEF	1.7 km	MPC · JPL
233568	2007 PW_{20}	—	August 9, 2007	Socorro	LINEAR	·	3.5 km	MPC · JPL
233569	2007 PB_{26}	—	August 9, 2007	Socorro	LINEAR	EOS	2.7 km	MPC · JPL
233570	2007 PU_{29}	—	August 8, 2007	Socorro	LINEAR	DOR	4.4 km	MPC · JPL
233571	2007 PW_{29}	—	August 8, 2007	Socorro	LINEAR	MIS	3.4 km	MPC · JPL
233572	2007 PR_{31}	—	August 8, 2007	Socorro	LINEAR	·	2.9 km	MPC · JPL
233573	2007 PX_{42}	—	August 9, 2007	Socorro	LINEAR	·	1.7 km	MPC · JPL
233574	2007 PR_{46}	—	August 10, 2007	Kitt Peak	Spacewatch	·	1.7 km	MPC · JPL
233575	2007 PZ_{46}	—	August 10, 2007	Kitt Peak	Spacewatch	·	2.3 km	MPC · JPL
233576	2007 QL	—	August 16, 2007	Socorro	LINEAR	VER	4.1 km	MPC · JPL
233577	2007 QU_{1}	—	August 17, 2007	Bisei SG Center	BATTeRS	·	2.7 km	MPC · JPL
233578	2007 QK_{5}	—	August 16, 2007	Paoma Mountain	PMO NEO Survey Program	L4	17 km	MPC · JPL
233579	2007 QK_{6}	—	August 21, 2007	Anderson Mesa	LONEOS	V	970 m	MPC · JPL
233580	2007 QW_{8}	—	August 22, 2007	Anderson Mesa	LONEOS	·	3.1 km	MPC · JPL
233581	2007 QX_{8}	—	August 22, 2007	Anderson Mesa	LONEOS	·	2.6 km	MPC · JPL
233582	2007 QH_{13}	—	August 24, 2007	Kitt Peak	Spacewatch	·	2.8 km	MPC · JPL
233583 Karafiáth	2007 RR	Karafiáth	September 1, 2007	Siding Spring	K. Sárneczky, L. Kiss	NYS	1.3 km	MPC · JPL
233584	2007 RQ_{2}	—	September 2, 2007	Catalina	CSS	·	3.9 km	MPC · JPL
233585	2007 RJ_{18}	—	September 14, 2007	Vicques	M. Ory	RAF	1.6 km	MPC · JPL
233586	2007 RA_{23}	—	September 3, 2007	Mount Lemmon	Mount Lemmon Survey	·	4.6 km	MPC · JPL
233587	2007 RY_{25}	—	September 4, 2007	Mount Lemmon	Mount Lemmon Survey	·	2.1 km	MPC · JPL
233588	2007 RD_{58}	—	September 9, 2007	Anderson Mesa	LONEOS	·	2.1 km	MPC · JPL
233589	2007 RC_{70}	—	September 10, 2007	Kitt Peak	Spacewatch	·	3.4 km	MPC · JPL
233590	2007 RX_{81}	—	September 10, 2007	Mount Lemmon	Mount Lemmon Survey	·	4.3 km	MPC · JPL
233591	2007 RS_{103}	—	September 11, 2007	Catalina	CSS	·	4.4 km	MPC · JPL
233592	2007 RT_{109}	—	September 11, 2007	Eskridge	G. Hug	·	3.6 km	MPC · JPL
233593	2007 RH_{116}	—	September 11, 2007	Kitt Peak	Spacewatch	AEO	1.6 km	MPC · JPL
233594	2007 RD_{120}	—	September 11, 2007	Lulin	LUSS	KOR	2.0 km	MPC · JPL
233595	2007 RM_{134}	—	September 12, 2007	Catalina	CSS	·	4.3 km	MPC · JPL
233596	2007 RY_{134}	—	September 12, 2007	Goodricke-Pigott	R. A. Tucker	·	3.1 km	MPC · JPL
233597	2007 RJ_{135}	—	September 13, 2007	Goodricke-Pigott	R. A. Tucker	·	5.2 km	MPC · JPL
233598	2007 RR_{137}	—	September 14, 2007	Anderson Mesa	LONEOS	·	3.2 km	MPC · JPL
233599	2007 RN_{158}	—	September 12, 2007	Catalina	CSS	KOR	1.9 km	MPC · JPL
233600	2007 RO_{168}	—	September 10, 2007	Kitt Peak	Spacewatch	L4	13 km	MPC · JPL

== 233601–233700 ==
back to top

Designation			Discovery			Properties		Ref
Permanent	Provisional	Named after	Date	Site	Discoverer(s)	Category	Diam.	Ref
233601	2007 RT_{210}	—	September 11, 2007	Kitt Peak	Spacewatch	·	5.1 km	MPC · JPL
233602	2007 RW_{260}	—	September 14, 2007	Kitt Peak	Spacewatch	·	5.0 km	MPC · JPL
233603	2007 RL_{277}	—	September 5, 2007	Anderson Mesa	LONEOS	·	4.1 km	MPC · JPL
233604	2007 RT_{308}	—	September 15, 2007	Kitt Peak	Spacewatch	·	4.3 km	MPC · JPL
233605	2007 RE_{310}	—	September 4, 2007	Catalina	CSS	·	2.3 km	MPC · JPL
233606	2007 SE_{10}	—	September 19, 2007	Kitt Peak	Spacewatch	·	2.2 km	MPC · JPL
233607	2007 SX_{12}	—	September 19, 2007	Kitt Peak	Spacewatch	·	2.0 km	MPC · JPL
233608	2007 SK_{16}	—	September 30, 2007	Kitt Peak	Spacewatch	·	2.5 km	MPC · JPL
233609	2007 TV_{6}	—	October 6, 2007	La Sagra	OAM	ERI	2.5 km	MPC · JPL
233610	2007 TE_{76}	—	October 5, 2007	Kitt Peak	Spacewatch	·	2.7 km	MPC · JPL
233611	2007 TH_{89}	—	October 8, 2007	Mount Lemmon	Mount Lemmon Survey	·	2.2 km	MPC · JPL
233612	2007 TB_{135}	—	October 8, 2007	Kitt Peak	Spacewatch	·	2.5 km	MPC · JPL
233613	2007 TT_{143}	—	October 6, 2007	Socorro	LINEAR	·	4.3 km	MPC · JPL
233614	2007 TS_{153}	—	October 9, 2007	Socorro	LINEAR	·	2.7 km	MPC · JPL
233615	2007 TM_{156}	—	October 9, 2007	Socorro	LINEAR	·	2.4 km	MPC · JPL
233616	2007 TA_{168}	—	October 12, 2007	Socorro	LINEAR	·	3.7 km	MPC · JPL
233617	2007 TS_{171}	—	October 13, 2007	Socorro	LINEAR	·	3.2 km	MPC · JPL
233618	2007 TQ_{204}	—	October 8, 2007	Mount Lemmon	Mount Lemmon Survey	·	1.9 km	MPC · JPL
233619	2007 TZ_{204}	—	October 8, 2007	Mount Lemmon	Mount Lemmon Survey	·	3.2 km	MPC · JPL
233620	2007 TL_{221}	—	October 9, 2007	Kitt Peak	Spacewatch	·	3.3 km	MPC · JPL
233621	2007 TP_{235}	—	October 9, 2007	Mount Lemmon	Mount Lemmon Survey	·	4.6 km	MPC · JPL
233622	2007 TJ_{236}	—	October 9, 2007	Mount Lemmon	Mount Lemmon Survey	·	2.3 km	MPC · JPL
233623	2007 TG_{243}	—	October 8, 2007	Catalina	CSS	·	3.7 km	MPC · JPL
233624	2007 TS_{272}	—	October 9, 2007	Kitt Peak	Spacewatch	HYG	3.9 km	MPC · JPL
233625	2007 TR_{274}	—	October 11, 2007	Kitt Peak	Spacewatch	·	2.1 km	MPC · JPL
233626	2007 TO_{393}	—	October 14, 2007	Mount Lemmon	Mount Lemmon Survey	·	2.8 km	MPC · JPL
233627	2007 TF_{440}	—	October 9, 2007	Socorro	LINEAR	·	4.3 km	MPC · JPL
233628	2007 TD_{443}	—	October 12, 2007	Catalina	CSS	TEL	2.2 km	MPC · JPL
233629	2007 UE_{52}	—	October 24, 2007	Mount Lemmon	Mount Lemmon Survey	ELF	6.7 km	MPC · JPL
233630	2007 UF_{91}	—	October 30, 2007	Mount Lemmon	Mount Lemmon Survey	·	1.6 km	MPC · JPL
233631	2007 UA_{107}	—	October 31, 2007	Mount Lemmon	Mount Lemmon Survey	ADE	4.4 km	MPC · JPL
233632	2007 UC_{113}	—	October 30, 2007	Catalina	CSS	·	5.1 km	MPC · JPL
233633	2007 VW_{10}	—	November 1, 2007	Kitt Peak	Spacewatch	·	4.0 km	MPC · JPL
233634	2007 VF_{25}	—	November 2, 2007	Catalina	CSS	·	3.9 km	MPC · JPL
233635	2007 VE_{27}	—	November 2, 2007	Calvin-Rehoboth	L. A. Molnar	·	5.7 km	MPC · JPL
233636	2007 VA_{32}	—	November 2, 2007	Kitt Peak	Spacewatch	·	4.9 km	MPC · JPL
233637	2007 VW_{89}	—	November 4, 2007	Socorro	LINEAR	·	6.0 km	MPC · JPL
233638	2007 VP_{216}	—	November 9, 2007	Kitt Peak	Spacewatch	·	4.6 km	MPC · JPL
233639	2007 WO_{17}	—	November 18, 2007	Mount Lemmon	Mount Lemmon Survey	·	6.5 km	MPC · JPL
233640	2008 AC_{19}	—	January 10, 2008	Mount Lemmon	Mount Lemmon Survey	MRX	1.2 km	MPC · JPL
233641	2008 HN_{12}	—	April 24, 2008	Kitt Peak	Spacewatch	ADE	3.7 km	MPC · JPL
233642	2008 KW	—	May 26, 2008	Kitt Peak	Spacewatch	·	2.3 km	MPC · JPL
233643	2008 MB_{1}	—	June 27, 2008	La Sagra	OAM	·	7.3 km	MPC · JPL
233644	2008 OZ_{6}	—	July 29, 2008	Črni Vrh	Matičič, S.	·	3.4 km	MPC · JPL
233645	2008 OO_{10}	—	July 28, 2008	Hibiscus	S. F. Hönig, Teamo, N.	·	5.0 km	MPC · JPL
233646	2008 OJ_{18}	—	July 30, 2008	Mount Lemmon	Mount Lemmon Survey	THM	2.8 km	MPC · JPL
233647	2008 PE_{2}	—	August 3, 2008	Hibiscus	S. F. Hönig, Teamo, N.	NYS	1.7 km	MPC · JPL
233648	2008 PN_{8}	—	August 6, 2008	La Sagra	OAM	V	970 m	MPC · JPL
233649	2008 PJ_{12}	—	August 10, 2008	Črni Vrh	J. Vales, H. Mikuž	·	5.6 km	MPC · JPL
233650	2008 PM_{15}	—	August 6, 2008	La Sagra	OAM	·	1.7 km	MPC · JPL
233651	2008 PV_{18}	—	August 6, 2008	Siding Spring	SSS	·	4.3 km	MPC · JPL
233652	2008 PC_{21}	—	August 3, 2008	Siding Spring	SSS	·	3.5 km	MPC · JPL
233653 Rether	2008 QR	Rether	August 23, 2008	Wildberg	R. Apitzsch	EUP	6.2 km	MPC · JPL
233654	2008 QV_{2}	—	August 24, 2008	Marly	P. Kocher	NYS	1.6 km	MPC · JPL
233655	2008 QH_{12}	—	August 25, 2008	La Sagra	OAM	MAS	940 m	MPC · JPL
233656	2008 QA_{20}	—	August 30, 2008	Hibiscus	S. F. Hönig, Teamo, N.	EUN	1.6 km	MPC · JPL
233657	2008 QE_{23}	—	August 26, 2008	Socorro	LINEAR	BRA	2.2 km	MPC · JPL
233658	2008 QG_{28}	—	August 30, 2008	La Sagra	OAM	GEF	2.4 km	MPC · JPL
233659	2008 QM_{28}	—	August 30, 2008	La Sagra	OAM	V	1.1 km	MPC · JPL
233660	2008 QR_{32}	—	August 27, 2008	Parc National des Cévennes	C. Demeautis, J.-M. Lopez	·	2.8 km	MPC · JPL
233661 Alytus	2008 QZ_{32}	Alytus	August 31, 2008	Moletai	K. Černis, Cernis, E.	·	1.4 km	MPC · JPL
233662	2008 QB_{44}	—	August 23, 2008	Siding Spring	SSS	·	6.3 km	MPC · JPL
233663	2008 QM_{47}	—	August 23, 2008	Kitt Peak	Spacewatch	·	3.3 km	MPC · JPL
233664	2008 RA_{2}	—	September 2, 2008	Kitt Peak	Spacewatch	·	1.4 km	MPC · JPL
233665	2008 RO_{9}	—	September 3, 2008	Kitt Peak	Spacewatch	·	1.7 km	MPC · JPL
233666	2008 RK_{23}	—	September 4, 2008	Socorro	LINEAR	·	2.8 km	MPC · JPL
233667	2008 RQ_{25}	—	September 5, 2008	Junk Bond	D. Healy	·	1.9 km	MPC · JPL
233668	2008 RS_{27}	—	September 8, 2008	Dauban	Kugel, F.	·	2.6 km	MPC · JPL
233669	2008 RC_{30}	—	September 2, 2008	Kitt Peak	Spacewatch	·	1.6 km	MPC · JPL
233670	2008 RW_{35}	—	September 2, 2008	Kitt Peak	Spacewatch	CYB	6.5 km	MPC · JPL
233671	2008 RY_{39}	—	September 2, 2008	Kitt Peak	Spacewatch	·	1.9 km	MPC · JPL
233672	2008 RO_{42}	—	September 2, 2008	Kitt Peak	Spacewatch	·	2.1 km	MPC · JPL
233673	2008 RP_{45}	—	September 2, 2008	Kitt Peak	Spacewatch	·	1.5 km	MPC · JPL
233674	2008 RE_{57}	—	September 3, 2008	Kitt Peak	Spacewatch	·	940 m	MPC · JPL
233675	2008 RR_{65}	—	September 4, 2008	Kitt Peak	Spacewatch	·	2.2 km	MPC · JPL
233676	2008 RD_{67}	—	September 4, 2008	Kitt Peak	Spacewatch	·	2.1 km	MPC · JPL
233677	2008 RJ_{70}	—	September 5, 2008	Kitt Peak	Spacewatch	·	5.0 km	MPC · JPL
233678	2008 RX_{74}	—	September 6, 2008	Catalina	CSS	NYS	1.2 km	MPC · JPL
233679	2008 RV_{79}	—	September 3, 2008	La Sagra	OAM	·	2.5 km	MPC · JPL
233680	2008 RU_{91}	—	September 6, 2008	Kitt Peak	Spacewatch	NYS	1.6 km	MPC · JPL
233681	2008 RH_{106}	—	September 7, 2008	Mount Lemmon	Mount Lemmon Survey	·	4.8 km	MPC · JPL
233682	2008 RV_{110}	—	September 3, 2008	Kitt Peak	Spacewatch	THM	2.5 km	MPC · JPL
233683	2008 RG_{113}	—	September 5, 2008	Kitt Peak	Spacewatch	L4 · ERY	10 km	MPC · JPL
233684	2008 RV_{116}	—	September 7, 2008	Mount Lemmon	Mount Lemmon Survey	·	5.8 km	MPC · JPL
233685	2008 RG_{121}	—	September 2, 2008	Kitt Peak	Spacewatch	MAS	1.0 km	MPC · JPL
233686	2008 RN_{129}	—	September 7, 2008	Mount Lemmon	Mount Lemmon Survey	KOR	1.7 km	MPC · JPL
233687	2008 RF_{134}	—	September 6, 2008	Catalina	CSS	·	1.3 km	MPC · JPL
233688	2008 RC_{136}	—	September 4, 2008	Socorro	LINEAR	AGN	1.7 km	MPC · JPL
233689	2008 SE_{4}	—	September 22, 2008	Socorro	LINEAR	·	2.2 km	MPC · JPL
233690	2008 SZ_{5}	—	September 22, 2008	Socorro	LINEAR	EUN	1.9 km	MPC · JPL
233691	2008 SX_{9}	—	September 22, 2008	Socorro	LINEAR	·	2.8 km	MPC · JPL
233692	2008 SX_{11}	—	September 20, 2008	Mount Lemmon	Mount Lemmon Survey	·	3.0 km	MPC · JPL
233693	2008 SM_{18}	—	September 19, 2008	Kitt Peak	Spacewatch	·	2.5 km	MPC · JPL
233694	2008 SM_{20}	—	September 19, 2008	Kitt Peak	Spacewatch	·	2.5 km	MPC · JPL
233695	2008 SB_{30}	—	September 19, 2008	Kitt Peak	Spacewatch	·	2.6 km	MPC · JPL
233696	2008 SU_{33}	—	September 20, 2008	Mount Lemmon	Mount Lemmon Survey	·	2.1 km	MPC · JPL
233697	2008 SE_{34}	—	September 20, 2008	Catalina	CSS	MAS	1.0 km	MPC · JPL
233698	2008 SK_{34}	—	September 20, 2008	Catalina	CSS	·	1.0 km	MPC · JPL
233699	2008 SW_{45}	—	September 20, 2008	Kitt Peak	Spacewatch	·	3.5 km	MPC · JPL
233700	2008 SN_{48}	—	September 20, 2008	Mount Lemmon	Mount Lemmon Survey	·	1.7 km	MPC · JPL

== 233701–233800 ==
back to top

Designation			Discovery			Properties		Ref
Permanent	Provisional	Named after	Date	Site	Discoverer(s)	Category	Diam.	Ref
233701	2008 SJ_{50}	—	September 20, 2008	Mount Lemmon	Mount Lemmon Survey	·	1.8 km	MPC · JPL
233702	2008 SF_{51}	—	September 20, 2008	Mount Lemmon	Mount Lemmon Survey	·	2.0 km	MPC · JPL
233703	2008 SK_{58}	—	September 20, 2008	Kitt Peak	Spacewatch	·	1.6 km	MPC · JPL
233704	2008 SY_{67}	—	September 21, 2008	Catalina	CSS	(2076)	1.1 km	MPC · JPL
233705	2008 SL_{68}	—	September 21, 2008	Mount Lemmon	Mount Lemmon Survey	·	1.9 km	MPC · JPL
233706	2008 SF_{74}	—	September 23, 2008	Catalina	CSS	·	3.6 km	MPC · JPL
233707 Alfons	2008 SA_{83}	Alfons	September 26, 2008	Wildberg	R. Apitzsch	·	1.8 km	MPC · JPL
233708	2008 SB_{91}	—	September 21, 2008	Kitt Peak	Spacewatch	·	1.5 km	MPC · JPL
233709	2008 SS_{95}	—	September 21, 2008	Kitt Peak	Spacewatch	·	2.5 km	MPC · JPL
233710	2008 SM_{97}	—	September 21, 2008	Kitt Peak	Spacewatch	·	2.5 km	MPC · JPL
233711	2008 SM_{102}	—	September 21, 2008	Kitt Peak	Spacewatch	·	2.0 km	MPC · JPL
233712	2008 SM_{105}	—	September 21, 2008	Kitt Peak	Spacewatch	·	2.0 km	MPC · JPL
233713	2008 SG_{107}	—	September 21, 2008	Siding Spring	SSS	PHO	3.4 km	MPC · JPL
233714	2008 SQ_{112}	—	September 22, 2008	Kitt Peak	Spacewatch	·	2.3 km	MPC · JPL
233715	2008 SD_{129}	—	September 22, 2008	Kitt Peak	Spacewatch	(5)	2.0 km	MPC · JPL
233716	2008 SO_{129}	—	September 22, 2008	Kitt Peak	Spacewatch	WIT	1.3 km	MPC · JPL
233717	2008 SK_{130}	—	September 22, 2008	Kitt Peak	Spacewatch	·	1.8 km	MPC · JPL
233718	2008 SR_{131}	—	September 22, 2008	Kitt Peak	Spacewatch	·	2.6 km	MPC · JPL
233719	2008 SE_{135}	—	September 23, 2008	Catalina	CSS	·	1.6 km	MPC · JPL
233720	2008 SK_{142}	—	September 24, 2008	Mount Lemmon	Mount Lemmon Survey	THM	3.4 km	MPC · JPL
233721	2008 SE_{143}	—	September 24, 2008	Mount Lemmon	Mount Lemmon Survey	·	3.6 km	MPC · JPL
233722	2008 SY_{151}	—	September 30, 2008	Sandlot	G. Hug	V	1.0 km	MPC · JPL
233723	2008 SS_{153}	—	September 22, 2008	Socorro	LINEAR	MRX	1.5 km	MPC · JPL
233724	2008 SN_{154}	—	September 22, 2008	Socorro	LINEAR	·	2.3 km	MPC · JPL
233725	2008 SP_{158}	—	September 24, 2008	Socorro	LINEAR	·	1.3 km	MPC · JPL
233726	2008 SZ_{165}	—	September 28, 2008	Socorro	LINEAR	·	1.5 km	MPC · JPL
233727	2008 SG_{167}	—	September 28, 2008	Socorro	LINEAR	·	3.8 km	MPC · JPL
233728	2008 SQ_{189}	—	September 25, 2008	Kitt Peak	Spacewatch	·	1.5 km	MPC · JPL
233729	2008 SF_{192}	—	September 25, 2008	Kitt Peak	Spacewatch	·	3.2 km	MPC · JPL
233730	2008 ST_{196}	—	September 25, 2008	Kitt Peak	Spacewatch	·	2.2 km	MPC · JPL
233731	2008 SL_{210}	—	September 28, 2008	Mount Lemmon	Mount Lemmon Survey	·	1.1 km	MPC · JPL
233732	2008 SD_{218}	—	September 29, 2008	La Sagra	OAM	·	3.5 km	MPC · JPL
233733	2008 SZ_{242}	—	September 29, 2008	Kitt Peak	Spacewatch	·	1.6 km	MPC · JPL
233734	2008 SF_{243}	—	September 29, 2008	Kitt Peak	Spacewatch	·	2.4 km	MPC · JPL
233735	2008 SK_{256}	—	September 20, 2008	Kitt Peak	Spacewatch	·	1.8 km	MPC · JPL
233736	2008 SS_{256}	—	September 21, 2008	Mount Lemmon	Mount Lemmon Survey	KOR	1.7 km	MPC · JPL
233737	2008 SB_{257}	—	September 21, 2008	Catalina	CSS	·	3.0 km	MPC · JPL
233738	2008 SN_{257}	—	September 22, 2008	Kitt Peak	Spacewatch	AGN	1.7 km	MPC · JPL
233739	2008 SJ_{258}	—	September 22, 2008	Kitt Peak	Spacewatch	·	2.2 km	MPC · JPL
233740	2008 SJ_{269}	—	September 21, 2008	Catalina	CSS	·	2.4 km	MPC · JPL
233741	2008 SN_{271}	—	September 29, 2008	Kitt Peak	Spacewatch	·	1.8 km	MPC · JPL
233742	2008 SB_{272}	—	September 29, 2008	Catalina	CSS	ADE	3.5 km	MPC · JPL
233743	2008 SO_{290}	—	September 29, 2008	Mount Lemmon	Mount Lemmon Survey	·	2.6 km	MPC · JPL
233744	2008 SA_{298}	—	September 20, 2008	Kitt Peak	Spacewatch	·	2.9 km	MPC · JPL
233745	2008 SF_{301}	—	September 23, 2008	Catalina	CSS	·	3.2 km	MPC · JPL
233746	2008 SR_{303}	—	September 24, 2008	Mount Lemmon	Mount Lemmon Survey	·	910 m	MPC · JPL
233747	2008 SL_{304}	—	September 24, 2008	Mount Lemmon	Mount Lemmon Survey	·	3.6 km	MPC · JPL
233748	2008 SL_{307}	—	September 29, 2008	Catalina	CSS	·	1.6 km	MPC · JPL
233749	2008 TF_{3}	—	October 2, 2008	Wrightwood	J. W. Young	·	1.8 km	MPC · JPL
233750	2008 TM_{4}	—	October 1, 2008	La Sagra	OAM	·	3.2 km	MPC · JPL
233751	2008 TW_{6}	—	October 3, 2008	La Sagra	OAM	·	2.1 km	MPC · JPL
233752	2008 TY_{8}	—	October 6, 2008	Goodricke-Pigott	R. A. Tucker	·	3.6 km	MPC · JPL
233753	2008 TN_{17}	—	October 1, 2008	Mount Lemmon	Mount Lemmon Survey	KOR	1.5 km	MPC · JPL
233754	2008 TH_{18}	—	October 1, 2008	Mount Lemmon	Mount Lemmon Survey	·	2.6 km	MPC · JPL
233755	2008 TT_{20}	—	October 1, 2008	Mount Lemmon	Mount Lemmon Survey	·	3.4 km	MPC · JPL
233756	2008 TQ_{24}	—	October 2, 2008	Catalina	CSS	(12739)	2.2 km	MPC · JPL
233757	2008 TY_{25}	—	October 8, 2008	Socorro	LINEAR	·	5.6 km	MPC · JPL
233758	2008 TV_{42}	—	October 1, 2008	Mount Lemmon	Mount Lemmon Survey	GEF	1.6 km	MPC · JPL
233759	2008 TL_{51}	—	October 2, 2008	Kitt Peak	Spacewatch	THM	3.9 km	MPC · JPL
233760	2008 TT_{55}	—	October 2, 2008	Kitt Peak	Spacewatch	·	1.6 km	MPC · JPL
233761	2008 TE_{67}	—	October 2, 2008	Kitt Peak	Spacewatch	·	2.4 km	MPC · JPL
233762	2008 TL_{67}	—	October 2, 2008	Kitt Peak	Spacewatch	·	3.8 km	MPC · JPL
233763	2008 TK_{74}	—	October 2, 2008	Kitt Peak	Spacewatch	·	4.5 km	MPC · JPL
233764	2008 TF_{84}	—	October 3, 2008	Kitt Peak	Spacewatch	·	2.5 km	MPC · JPL
233765	2008 TR_{99}	—	October 6, 2008	Kitt Peak	Spacewatch	MAS	1.1 km	MPC · JPL
233766	2008 TL_{104}	—	October 6, 2008	Kitt Peak	Spacewatch	·	1.5 km	MPC · JPL
233767	2008 TD_{112}	—	October 6, 2008	Catalina	CSS	EOS	2.8 km	MPC · JPL
233768	2008 TM_{112}	—	October 6, 2008	Catalina	CSS	·	3.6 km	MPC · JPL
233769	2008 TB_{118}	—	October 6, 2008	Kitt Peak	Spacewatch	·	3.4 km	MPC · JPL
233770	2008 TK_{120}	—	October 7, 2008	Mount Lemmon	Mount Lemmon Survey	·	2.8 km	MPC · JPL
233771	2008 TO_{124}	—	October 8, 2008	Mount Lemmon	Mount Lemmon Survey	·	2.5 km	MPC · JPL
233772	2008 TW_{130}	—	October 8, 2008	Mount Lemmon	Mount Lemmon Survey	·	1.6 km	MPC · JPL
233773	2008 TU_{146}	—	October 9, 2008	Mount Lemmon	Mount Lemmon Survey	L4	8.3 km	MPC · JPL
233774	2008 TE_{158}	—	October 5, 2008	La Sagra	OAM	EOS	4.3 km	MPC · JPL
233775	2008 TO_{158}	—	October 11, 2008	Hibiscus	Teamo, N.	·	2.2 km	MPC · JPL
233776	2008 TH_{160}	—	October 1, 2008	Kitt Peak	Spacewatch	·	1.7 km	MPC · JPL
233777	2008 TT_{161}	—	October 8, 2008	Kitt Peak	Spacewatch	MAS	880 m	MPC · JPL
233778	2008 TK_{164}	—	October 1, 2008	Catalina	CSS	T_{j} (2.92) · 3:2	4.8 km	MPC · JPL
233779	2008 TF_{165}	—	October 2, 2008	Kitt Peak	Spacewatch	·	3.9 km	MPC · JPL
233780	2008 TR_{167}	—	October 10, 2008	Catalina	CSS	·	5.4 km	MPC · JPL
233781	2008 TO_{171}	—	October 3, 2008	Mount Lemmon	Mount Lemmon Survey	·	2.0 km	MPC · JPL
233782	2008 TP_{172}	—	October 10, 2008	Mount Lemmon	Mount Lemmon Survey	EUN	1.8 km	MPC · JPL
233783	2008 TR_{180}	—	October 4, 2008	Catalina	CSS	·	4.9 km	MPC · JPL
233784	2008 UR_{1}	—	October 21, 2008	Goodricke-Pigott	R. A. Tucker	·	3.1 km	MPC · JPL
233785	2008 UA_{4}	—	October 23, 2008	Bergisch Gladbach	W. Bickel	·	1.8 km	MPC · JPL
233786	2008 UH_{6}	—	October 21, 2008	Mount Lemmon	Mount Lemmon Survey	·	2.6 km	MPC · JPL
233787	2008 UG_{15}	—	October 18, 2008	Kitt Peak	Spacewatch	·	2.3 km	MPC · JPL
233788	2008 UW_{16}	—	October 18, 2008	Kitt Peak	Spacewatch	MAS	890 m	MPC · JPL
233789	2008 UH_{22}	—	October 19, 2008	Kitt Peak	Spacewatch	·	2.1 km	MPC · JPL
233790	2008 UY_{23}	—	October 20, 2008	Kitt Peak	Spacewatch	L4	10 km	MPC · JPL
233791	2008 UO_{24}	—	October 20, 2008	Kitt Peak	Spacewatch	·	2.3 km	MPC · JPL
233792	2008 UQ_{41}	—	October 20, 2008	Kitt Peak	Spacewatch	·	2.3 km	MPC · JPL
233793	2008 UH_{53}	—	October 20, 2008	Kitt Peak	Spacewatch	KOR	1.5 km	MPC · JPL
233794	2008 UE_{59}	—	October 21, 2008	Kitt Peak	Spacewatch	KOR	1.9 km	MPC · JPL
233795	2008 UA_{60}	—	October 21, 2008	Kitt Peak	Spacewatch	·	4.8 km	MPC · JPL
233796	2008 UU_{61}	—	October 21, 2008	Kitt Peak	Spacewatch	·	3.4 km	MPC · JPL
233797	2008 UW_{83}	—	October 22, 2008	Kitt Peak	Spacewatch	·	1.4 km	MPC · JPL
233798	2008 US_{94}	—	October 28, 2008	Kachina	Hobart, J.	·	2.3 km	MPC · JPL
233799	2008 UQ_{110}	—	October 22, 2008	Kitt Peak	Spacewatch	·	2.8 km	MPC · JPL
233800	2008 UZ_{111}	—	October 22, 2008	Kitt Peak	Spacewatch	·	2.0 km	MPC · JPL

== 233801–233900 ==
back to top

Designation			Discovery			Properties		Ref
Permanent	Provisional	Named after	Date	Site	Discoverer(s)	Category	Diam.	Ref
233801	2008 UW_{113}	—	October 22, 2008	Kitt Peak	Spacewatch	·	3.9 km	MPC · JPL
233802	2008 UJ_{114}	—	October 22, 2008	Kitt Peak	Spacewatch	HYG	3.4 km	MPC · JPL
233803	2008 UH_{117}	—	October 22, 2008	Kitt Peak	Spacewatch	·	1.8 km	MPC · JPL
233804	2008 UX_{117}	—	October 22, 2008	Kitt Peak	Spacewatch	·	1.3 km	MPC · JPL
233805	2008 US_{127}	—	October 22, 2008	Kitt Peak	Spacewatch	·	4.2 km	MPC · JPL
233806	2008 UO_{143}	—	October 23, 2008	Kitt Peak	Spacewatch	·	3.4 km	MPC · JPL
233807	2008 UK_{144}	—	October 23, 2008	Kitt Peak	Spacewatch	AST	3.0 km	MPC · JPL
233808	2008 UD_{145}	—	October 23, 2008	Kitt Peak	Spacewatch	·	2.0 km	MPC · JPL
233809	2008 UR_{148}	—	October 23, 2008	Kitt Peak	Spacewatch	·	5.2 km	MPC · JPL
233810	2008 UR_{151}	—	October 23, 2008	Kitt Peak	Spacewatch	(12739)	2.4 km	MPC · JPL
233811	2008 UN_{155}	—	October 23, 2008	Mount Lemmon	Mount Lemmon Survey	·	1.4 km	MPC · JPL
233812	2008 UW_{165}	—	October 24, 2008	Kitt Peak	Spacewatch	MAS	890 m	MPC · JPL
233813	2008 UM_{167}	—	October 24, 2008	Kitt Peak	Spacewatch	·	2.3 km	MPC · JPL
233814	2008 UF_{170}	—	October 24, 2008	Catalina	CSS	·	3.2 km	MPC · JPL
233815	2008 UK_{174}	—	October 24, 2008	Kitt Peak	Spacewatch	·	1.6 km	MPC · JPL
233816	2008 US_{183}	—	October 24, 2008	Mount Lemmon	Mount Lemmon Survey	KOR	1.7 km	MPC · JPL
233817	2008 UC_{185}	—	October 24, 2008	Kitt Peak	Spacewatch	·	3.5 km	MPC · JPL
233818	2008 UA_{192}	—	October 25, 2008	Catalina	CSS	·	2.5 km	MPC · JPL
233819	2008 UB_{192}	—	October 25, 2008	Catalina	CSS	AGN	1.7 km	MPC · JPL
233820	2008 UG_{201}	—	October 28, 2008	Socorro	LINEAR	·	3.4 km	MPC · JPL
233821	2008 UC_{203}	—	October 28, 2008	Socorro	LINEAR	·	1.2 km	MPC · JPL
233822	2008 UE_{203}	—	October 28, 2008	Socorro	LINEAR	·	3.0 km	MPC · JPL
233823	2008 UM_{208}	—	October 23, 2008	Kitt Peak	Spacewatch	·	3.6 km	MPC · JPL
233824	2008 US_{211}	—	October 23, 2008	Mount Lemmon	Mount Lemmon Survey	·	1.4 km	MPC · JPL
233825	2008 UE_{240}	—	October 26, 2008	Kitt Peak	Spacewatch	·	2.4 km	MPC · JPL
233826	2008 UB_{242}	—	October 26, 2008	Catalina	CSS	·	3.2 km	MPC · JPL
233827	2008 UF_{244}	—	October 26, 2008	Mount Lemmon	Mount Lemmon Survey	L4	13 km	MPC · JPL
233828	2008 UP_{244}	—	October 26, 2008	Catalina	CSS	MAR	1.9 km	MPC · JPL
233829	2008 UE_{248}	—	October 26, 2008	Kitt Peak	Spacewatch	·	2.7 km	MPC · JPL
233830	2008 UQ_{248}	—	October 26, 2008	Kitt Peak	Spacewatch	KOR	1.8 km	MPC · JPL
233831	2008 UO_{253}	—	October 27, 2008	Kitt Peak	Spacewatch	·	1.8 km	MPC · JPL
233832	2008 UR_{262}	—	October 27, 2008	Kitt Peak	Spacewatch	·	2.4 km	MPC · JPL
233833	2008 UY_{266}	—	October 28, 2008	Kitt Peak	Spacewatch	·	2.4 km	MPC · JPL
233834	2008 UA_{267}	—	October 28, 2008	Kitt Peak	Spacewatch	·	1.8 km	MPC · JPL
233835	2008 UD_{274}	—	October 28, 2008	Kitt Peak	Spacewatch	·	3.1 km	MPC · JPL
233836	2008 UF_{277}	—	October 28, 2008	Mount Lemmon	Mount Lemmon Survey	THM	2.6 km	MPC · JPL
233837	2008 UX_{277}	—	October 28, 2008	Mount Lemmon	Mount Lemmon Survey	·	2.8 km	MPC · JPL
233838	2008 UY_{278}	—	October 28, 2008	Mount Lemmon	Mount Lemmon Survey	THM	3.3 km	MPC · JPL
233839	2008 UW_{288}	—	October 28, 2008	Mount Lemmon	Mount Lemmon Survey	·	2.0 km	MPC · JPL
233840	2008 UZ_{291}	—	October 29, 2008	Kitt Peak	Spacewatch	·	2.4 km	MPC · JPL
233841	2008 UR_{296}	—	October 29, 2008	Kitt Peak	Spacewatch	PAD	2.4 km	MPC · JPL
233842	2008 UO_{303}	—	October 29, 2008	Kitt Peak	Spacewatch	·	2.0 km	MPC · JPL
233843	2008 UZ_{305}	—	October 30, 2008	Kitt Peak	Spacewatch	·	2.7 km	MPC · JPL
233844	2008 UU_{307}	—	October 30, 2008	Kitt Peak	Spacewatch	·	2.6 km	MPC · JPL
233845	2008 UK_{318}	—	October 31, 2008	Mount Lemmon	Mount Lemmon Survey	WIT	1.2 km	MPC · JPL
233846	2008 UZ_{343}	—	October 25, 2008	Mount Lemmon	Mount Lemmon Survey	·	3.0 km	MPC · JPL
233847	2008 UQ_{347}	—	October 23, 2008	Kitt Peak	Spacewatch	·	1.7 km	MPC · JPL
233848	2008 UV_{347}	—	October 23, 2008	Kitt Peak	Spacewatch	THM	3.5 km	MPC · JPL
233849	2008 UH_{351}	—	October 28, 2008	Kitt Peak	Spacewatch	·	1.4 km	MPC · JPL
233850	2008 UL_{354}	—	October 27, 2008	Kitt Peak	Spacewatch	AST	2.9 km	MPC · JPL
233851	2008 UG_{357}	—	October 24, 2008	Kitt Peak	Spacewatch	·	1.8 km	MPC · JPL
233852	2008 UC_{364}	—	October 26, 2008	Catalina	CSS	·	4.4 km	MPC · JPL
233853	2008 UU_{365}	—	October 25, 2008	Mount Lemmon	Mount Lemmon Survey	KOR	1.5 km	MPC · JPL
233854	2008 UU_{367}	—	October 26, 2008	Socorro	LINEAR	·	3.5 km	MPC · JPL
233855	2008 VG_{2}	—	November 2, 2008	Socorro	LINEAR	·	2.2 km	MPC · JPL
233856	2008 VM_{3}	—	November 3, 2008	Socorro	LINEAR	·	1.4 km	MPC · JPL
233857	2008 VL_{13}	—	November 7, 2008	Socorro	LINEAR	EOS	5.6 km	MPC · JPL
233858	2008 VX_{13}	—	November 2, 2008	Mount Lemmon	Mount Lemmon Survey	·	2.8 km	MPC · JPL
233859	2008 VR_{15}	—	November 1, 2008	Kitt Peak	Spacewatch	·	5.2 km	MPC · JPL
233860	2008 VL_{23}	—	November 1, 2008	Kitt Peak	Spacewatch	·	3.4 km	MPC · JPL
233861	2008 VG_{35}	—	November 2, 2008	Mount Lemmon	Mount Lemmon Survey	·	3.6 km	MPC · JPL
233862	2008 VL_{38}	—	November 2, 2008	Kitt Peak	Spacewatch	·	2.2 km	MPC · JPL
233863	2008 VN_{42}	—	November 3, 2008	Mount Lemmon	Mount Lemmon Survey	·	1.8 km	MPC · JPL
233864	2008 VO_{59}	—	November 7, 2008	Catalina	CSS	T_{j} (2.99) · 3:2	5.8 km	MPC · JPL
233865	2008 VL_{70}	—	November 7, 2008	Mount Lemmon	Mount Lemmon Survey	·	2.2 km	MPC · JPL
233866	2008 VN_{76}	—	November 1, 2008	Mount Lemmon	Mount Lemmon Survey	·	2.3 km	MPC · JPL
233867	2008 WK_{13}	—	November 19, 2008	Socorro	LINEAR	·	2.9 km	MPC · JPL
233868	2008 WH_{15}	—	November 17, 2008	Kitt Peak	Spacewatch	·	4.2 km	MPC · JPL
233869	2008 WE_{20}	—	November 17, 2008	Kitt Peak	Spacewatch	AST	2.2 km	MPC · JPL
233870	2008 WT_{22}	—	November 18, 2008	Catalina	CSS	·	2.5 km	MPC · JPL
233871	2008 WQ_{23}	—	November 18, 2008	Catalina	CSS	·	4.0 km	MPC · JPL
233872	2008 WW_{23}	—	November 18, 2008	Catalina	CSS	·	2.7 km	MPC · JPL
233873	2008 WG_{25}	—	November 18, 2008	Catalina	CSS	HOF	3.1 km	MPC · JPL
233874	2008 WL_{59}	—	November 18, 2008	Socorro	LINEAR	·	2.6 km	MPC · JPL
233875	2008 WT_{59}	—	November 18, 2008	Socorro	LINEAR	·	2.1 km	MPC · JPL
233876	2008 WB_{61}	—	November 21, 2008	Socorro	LINEAR	·	3.7 km	MPC · JPL
233877	2008 WY_{78}	—	November 20, 2008	Kitt Peak	Spacewatch	·	3.0 km	MPC · JPL
233878	2008 WQ_{81}	—	November 20, 2008	Kitt Peak	Spacewatch	T_{j} (2.97)	4.9 km	MPC · JPL
233879	2008 WM_{91}	—	November 23, 2008	Mount Lemmon	Mount Lemmon Survey	EOS	2.4 km	MPC · JPL
233880 Urbanpriol	2008 WF_{93}	Urbanpriol	November 26, 2008	Wildberg	R. Apitzsch	·	3.1 km	MPC · JPL
233881	2008 WO_{101}	—	November 30, 2008	Catalina	CSS	·	3.0 km	MPC · JPL
233882	2008 WR_{137}	—	November 23, 2008	Kitt Peak	Spacewatch	·	3.0 km	MPC · JPL
233883	2008 XO_{5}	—	December 3, 2008	Socorro	LINEAR	·	3.8 km	MPC · JPL
233884	2008 XP_{10}	—	December 1, 2008	Catalina	CSS	·	2.5 km	MPC · JPL
233885	2008 XF_{11}	—	December 1, 2008	Catalina	CSS	·	2.4 km	MPC · JPL
233886	2008 XQ_{18}	—	December 1, 2008	Kitt Peak	Spacewatch	·	3.5 km	MPC · JPL
233887	2008 XC_{21}	—	December 1, 2008	Kitt Peak	Spacewatch	·	2.2 km	MPC · JPL
233888	2008 XZ_{22}	—	December 3, 2008	Kitt Peak	Spacewatch	·	2.4 km	MPC · JPL
233889	2008 XH_{42}	—	December 2, 2008	Kitt Peak	Spacewatch	·	3.5 km	MPC · JPL
233890	2008 XV_{53}	—	December 1, 2008	Socorro	LINEAR	·	4.9 km	MPC · JPL
233891	2008 XA_{54}	—	December 1, 2008	Kitt Peak	Spacewatch	·	3.7 km	MPC · JPL
233892	2008 YE_{4}	—	December 22, 2008	Dauban	Kugel, F.	·	3.6 km	MPC · JPL
233893 Honthyhanna	2008 YW_{5}	Honthyhanna	December 21, 2008	Piszkéstető	K. Sárneczky	3:2 · SHU	5.2 km	MPC · JPL
233894	2008 YK_{29}	—	December 27, 2008	Bisei SG Center	BATTeRS	·	5.0 km	MPC · JPL
233895	2008 YF_{49}	—	December 29, 2008	Mount Lemmon	Mount Lemmon Survey	·	1.4 km	MPC · JPL
233896	2008 YB_{80}	—	December 30, 2008	Mount Lemmon	Mount Lemmon Survey	PAD	2.7 km	MPC · JPL
233897	2008 YJ_{127}	—	December 30, 2008	Kitt Peak	Spacewatch	·	2.7 km	MPC · JPL
233898	2008 YF_{135}	—	December 30, 2008	Kitt Peak	Spacewatch	·	4.6 km	MPC · JPL
233899	2009 AB_{19}	—	January 2, 2009	Kitt Peak	Spacewatch	·	1.6 km	MPC · JPL
233900	2009 AN_{24}	—	January 3, 2009	Kitt Peak	Spacewatch	·	6.7 km	MPC · JPL

== 233901–234000 ==
back to top

Designation			Discovery			Properties		Ref
Permanent	Provisional	Named after	Date	Site	Discoverer(s)	Category	Diam.	Ref
233901	2009 BT	—	January 16, 2009	Mayhill	Lowe, A.	·	3.9 km	MPC · JPL
233902	2009 BM_{7}	—	January 18, 2009	Socorro	LINEAR	(5)	1.5 km	MPC · JPL
233903	2009 BD_{47}	—	January 16, 2009	Kitt Peak	Spacewatch	AGN	1.4 km	MPC · JPL
233904	2009 BA_{128}	—	January 29, 2009	Mount Lemmon	Mount Lemmon Survey	·	6.0 km	MPC · JPL
233905	2009 CU_{22}	—	February 1, 2009	Kitt Peak	Spacewatch	(194)	3.2 km	MPC · JPL
233906	2009 CT_{38}	—	February 13, 2009	Kitt Peak	Spacewatch	EMA	4.3 km	MPC · JPL
233907	2009 CA_{62}	—	February 3, 2009	Kitt Peak	Spacewatch	slow	6.8 km	MPC · JPL
233908	2009 CD_{62}	—	February 2, 2009	Mount Lemmon	Mount Lemmon Survey	VER	6.3 km	MPC · JPL
233909	2009 DF_{36}	—	February 21, 2009	Catalina	CSS	·	1.9 km	MPC · JPL
233910	2009 FJ_{20}	—	March 17, 2009	Bergisch Gladbach	W. Bickel	·	7.2 km	MPC · JPL
233911	2009 FT_{38}	—	March 17, 2009	Kitt Peak	Spacewatch	·	1.2 km	MPC · JPL
233912	2009 NC	—	July 3, 2009	La Sagra	OAM	PHO	1.7 km	MPC · JPL
233913	2009 QD_{58}	—	August 18, 2009	Kitt Peak	Spacewatch	·	1.9 km	MPC · JPL
233914	2009 RD_{60}	—	September 11, 2009	Catalina	CSS	TIR	4.2 km	MPC · JPL
233915	2009 RE_{73}	—	September 14, 2009	Kitt Peak	Spacewatch	L4	11 km	MPC · JPL
233916	2009 SV_{95}	—	September 19, 2009	Kitt Peak	Spacewatch	THM	3.0 km	MPC · JPL
233917	2009 SL_{129}	—	September 18, 2009	Kitt Peak	Spacewatch	·	2.9 km	MPC · JPL
233918	2009 SU_{146}	—	September 19, 2009	Kitt Peak	Spacewatch	L4	9.3 km	MPC · JPL
233919	2009 SP_{154}	—	September 20, 2009	Kitt Peak	Spacewatch	THM	1.9 km	MPC · JPL
233920	2009 SD_{161}	—	September 21, 2009	La Sagra	OAM	·	3.4 km	MPC · JPL
233921	2009 SC_{320}	—	September 20, 2009	Mount Lemmon	Mount Lemmon Survey	·	1.7 km	MPC · JPL
233922	2009 TT_{1}	—	October 9, 2009	La Sagra	OAM	·	1.8 km	MPC · JPL
233923	2009 TD_{20}	—	October 11, 2009	Mount Lemmon	Mount Lemmon Survey	·	4.5 km	MPC · JPL
233924	2009 TM_{32}	—	October 14, 2009	Mount Lemmon	Mount Lemmon Survey	EOS	2.7 km	MPC · JPL
233925	2009 UL_{2}	—	October 18, 2009	Tzec Maun	Tozzi, F.	L4	16 km	MPC · JPL
233926	2009 UN_{4}	—	October 18, 2009	Bisei SG Center	BATTeRS	MAS	800 m	MPC · JPL
233927	2009 UT_{32}	—	October 18, 2009	Mount Lemmon	Mount Lemmon Survey	·	2.3 km	MPC · JPL
233928	2009 UY_{57}	—	October 23, 2009	Mount Lemmon	Mount Lemmon Survey	NYS	1.2 km	MPC · JPL
233929	2009 UN_{83}	—	October 23, 2009	Mount Lemmon	Mount Lemmon Survey	NYS	880 m	MPC · JPL
233930	2009 UG_{88}	—	October 21, 2009	Catalina	CSS	·	2.7 km	MPC · JPL
233931	2009 UF_{103}	—	October 24, 2009	Catalina	CSS	·	2.4 km	MPC · JPL
233932	2009 UZ_{136}	—	October 26, 2009	Catalina	CSS	·	5.2 km	MPC · JPL
233933	2009 UY_{146}	—	October 18, 2009	Mount Lemmon	Mount Lemmon Survey	ADE	3.3 km	MPC · JPL
233934	2009 VT_{16}	—	November 8, 2009	Mount Lemmon	Mount Lemmon Survey	·	7.8 km	MPC · JPL
233935	2009 VE_{31}	—	November 9, 2009	Mount Lemmon	Mount Lemmon Survey	·	3.0 km	MPC · JPL
233936	2009 VZ_{38}	—	November 9, 2009	Kitt Peak	Spacewatch	·	1.5 km	MPC · JPL
233937	2009 VC_{50}	—	November 11, 2009	La Sagra	OAM	·	2.5 km	MPC · JPL
233938	2009 VM_{57}	—	November 12, 2009	La Sagra	OAM	·	5.3 km	MPC · JPL
233939	2009 VR_{58}	—	November 15, 2009	Sierra Stars	Dillon, W. G., Wells, D.	3:2	5.1 km	MPC · JPL
233940	2009 VH_{81}	—	November 15, 2009	Catalina	CSS	·	5.1 km	MPC · JPL
233941	2009 WM_{5}	—	November 16, 2009	Mount Lemmon	Mount Lemmon Survey	THM	2.3 km	MPC · JPL
233942	2009 WH_{6}	—	November 18, 2009	Mayhill	Lowe, A.	·	3.0 km	MPC · JPL
233943 Falera	2009 WU_{24}	Falera	November 21, 2009	Falera	J. De Queiroz	·	3.7 km	MPC · JPL
233944	2009 WL_{45}	—	November 18, 2009	Kitt Peak	Spacewatch	·	3.6 km	MPC · JPL
233945	2009 WE_{74}	—	November 18, 2009	Kitt Peak	Spacewatch	MAS	820 m	MPC · JPL
233946	2009 WG_{125}	—	November 20, 2009	Kitt Peak	Spacewatch	AGN	1.9 km	MPC · JPL
233947	2009 WM_{141}	—	November 18, 2009	Mount Lemmon	Mount Lemmon Survey	·	2.8 km	MPC · JPL
233948	2009 WQ_{169}	—	November 22, 2009	Kitt Peak	Spacewatch	HOF	4.7 km	MPC · JPL
233949	2009 WC_{216}	—	November 27, 2009	Siding Spring	SSS	·	1.2 km	MPC · JPL
233950	2009 WO_{252}	—	November 26, 2009	Kitt Peak	Spacewatch	3:2 · SHU	5.7 km	MPC · JPL
233951	2009 XJ	—	December 7, 2009	Pla D'Arguines	R. Ferrando	·	3.4 km	MPC · JPL
233952	2009 XQ_{9}	—	December 12, 2009	Socorro	LINEAR	·	1.4 km	MPC · JPL
233953	2009 XS_{15}	—	December 15, 2009	Mount Lemmon	Mount Lemmon Survey	·	5.4 km	MPC · JPL
233954	2009 XY_{16}	—	December 15, 2009	Mount Lemmon	Mount Lemmon Survey	·	5.4 km	MPC · JPL
233955	2009 XB_{19}	—	December 15, 2009	Mount Lemmon	Mount Lemmon Survey	·	4.2 km	MPC · JPL
233956	2009 XL_{19}	—	December 15, 2009	Mount Lemmon	Mount Lemmon Survey	·	1.7 km	MPC · JPL
233957	2009 YQ_{16}	—	December 19, 2009	Bisei SG Center	BATTeRS	·	840 m	MPC · JPL
233958	2009 YP_{21}	—	December 27, 2009	Kitt Peak	Spacewatch	·	2.6 km	MPC · JPL
233959	2009 YX_{21}	—	December 17, 2009	Mount Lemmon	Mount Lemmon Survey	·	1.6 km	MPC · JPL
233960	2010 AX_{2}	—	January 7, 2010	Mayhill	Lowe, A.	·	5.7 km	MPC · JPL
233961	2010 AA_{3}	—	January 7, 2010	Mayhill	Lowe, A.	·	3.1 km	MPC · JPL
233962	2010 AY_{25}	—	January 6, 2010	Catalina	CSS	·	3.7 km	MPC · JPL
233963	2010 AP_{31}	—	January 6, 2010	Kitt Peak	Spacewatch	(5)	1.4 km	MPC · JPL
233964	2010 AC_{37}	—	January 7, 2010	Kitt Peak	Spacewatch	·	1.5 km	MPC · JPL
233965	2010 AM_{59}	—	January 6, 2010	Catalina	CSS	·	1.6 km	MPC · JPL
233966	2010 BS_{2}	—	January 16, 2010	Mayhill	Mayhill	·	3.5 km	MPC · JPL
233967 Vierkant	2010 BN_{4}	Vierkant	January 24, 2010	Sierra Stars	R. Kracht	·	2.9 km	MPC · JPL
233968	3021 T-2	—	September 30, 1973	Palomar	C. J. van Houten, I. van Houten-Groeneveld, T. Gehrels	·	1.9 km	MPC · JPL
233969	1979 OK_{9}	—	July 24, 1979	Siding Spring	S. J. Bus	·	2.2 km	MPC · JPL
233970	1981 ES_{44}	—	March 7, 1981	Siding Spring	S. J. Bus	EUN	1.8 km	MPC · JPL
233971	1991 TD_{2}	—	October 8, 1991	Kitt Peak	Spacewatch	·	900 m	MPC · JPL
233972	1992 PZ_{5}	—	August 3, 1992	Palomar	H. E. Holt	·	2.0 km	MPC · JPL
233973	1993 FX_{4}	—	March 17, 1993	La Silla	UESAC	·	5.3 km	MPC · JPL
233974	1993 FG_{45}	—	March 19, 1993	La Silla	UESAC	PAD	2.8 km	MPC · JPL
233975	1994 RC_{7}	—	September 12, 1994	Kitt Peak	Spacewatch	PAD	2.8 km	MPC · JPL
233976	1994 RC_{14}	—	September 12, 1994	Kitt Peak	Spacewatch	GEF	1.7 km	MPC · JPL
233977	1994 UK_{9}	—	October 28, 1994	Kitt Peak	Spacewatch	·	1.9 km	MPC · JPL
233978	1995 FD_{9}	—	March 26, 1995	Kitt Peak	Spacewatch	·	1.4 km	MPC · JPL
233979	1995 LS	—	June 4, 1995	Kitt Peak	Spacewatch	·	3.0 km	MPC · JPL
233980	1995 NF_{1}	—	July 2, 1995	Kitt Peak	Spacewatch	HIL · 3:2	7.6 km	MPC · JPL
233981	1995 OL_{2}	—	July 22, 1995	Kitt Peak	Spacewatch	·	3.7 km	MPC · JPL
233982	1995 PW	—	August 3, 1995	Kitt Peak	Spacewatch	·	2.5 km	MPC · JPL
233983	1995 SA_{16}	—	September 18, 1995	Kitt Peak	Spacewatch	·	3.8 km	MPC · JPL
233984	1995 SF_{16}	—	September 18, 1995	Kitt Peak	Spacewatch	·	1.2 km	MPC · JPL
233985	1995 SX_{30}	—	September 20, 1995	Kitt Peak	Spacewatch	·	3.6 km	MPC · JPL
233986	1995 SV_{33}	—	September 22, 1995	Kitt Peak	Spacewatch	·	4.3 km	MPC · JPL
233987	1995 UJ_{65}	—	October 27, 1995	Kitt Peak	Spacewatch	·	820 m	MPC · JPL
233988	1995 VO_{3}	—	November 14, 1995	Kitt Peak	Spacewatch	·	1.8 km	MPC · JPL
233989	1995 VY_{6}	—	November 14, 1995	Kitt Peak	Spacewatch	·	630 m	MPC · JPL
233990	1995 WK_{17}	—	November 17, 1995	Kitt Peak	Spacewatch	·	2.2 km	MPC · JPL
233991	1995 WU_{23}	—	November 18, 1995	Kitt Peak	Spacewatch	fast	1.8 km	MPC · JPL
233992	1996 GN_{3}	—	April 9, 1996	Kitt Peak	Spacewatch	·	1.4 km	MPC · JPL
233993	1996 GS_{5}	—	April 11, 1996	Kitt Peak	Spacewatch	HOF	2.8 km	MPC · JPL
233994	1996 RT_{6}	—	September 5, 1996	Kitt Peak	Spacewatch	·	2.8 km	MPC · JPL
233995	1996 RH_{16}	—	September 13, 1996	Kitt Peak	Spacewatch	·	2.4 km	MPC · JPL
233996	1996 RS_{21}	—	September 7, 1996	Kitt Peak	Spacewatch	·	1.6 km	MPC · JPL
233997	1996 SF_{1}	—	September 17, 1996	Kitt Peak	Spacewatch	·	4.1 km	MPC · JPL
233998	1996 TZ_{16}	—	October 4, 1996	Kitt Peak	Spacewatch	·	3.3 km	MPC · JPL
233999	1996 VG_{35}	—	November 9, 1996	Kitt Peak	Spacewatch	·	3.9 km	MPC · JPL
234000	1996 XP_{13}	—	December 8, 1996	Oizumi	T. Kobayashi	·	3.3 km	MPC · JPL

back to top

== See also ==
- Meanings of minor-planet names: 233001–234000
