= Meanings of minor-planet names: 232001–233000 =

As minor planet discoveries are confirmed, they are given a permanent number by the IAU's Minor Planet Center (MPC), and the discoverers can then submit names for them, following the IAU's naming conventions. The list below concerns those minor planets in the specified number-range that have received names, and explains the meanings of those names.

Official naming citations of newly named small Solar System bodies are approved and published in a bulletin by IAU's Working Group for Small Bodies Nomenclature (WGSBN). Before May 2021, citations were published in MPC's Minor Planet Circulars for many decades. Recent citations can also be found on the JPL Small-Body Database (SBDB). Until his death in 2016, German astronomer Lutz D. Schmadel compiled these citations into the Dictionary of Minor Planet Names (DMP) and regularly updated the collection.

Based on Paul Herget's The Names of the Minor Planets, Schmadel also researched the unclear origin of numerous asteroids, most of which had been named prior to World War II. This article incorporates text from this source, which is in the public domain: SBDB New namings may only be added to this list below after official publication as the preannouncement of names is condemned. The WGSBN publishes a comprehensive guideline for the naming rules of non-cometary small Solar System bodies.

== 232001–232100 ==
Named minor planet	Provisional	This minor planet was named for...	Ref · Catalog
There are no named minor planets in this number range

== 232101–232200 ==
back to top

Named minor planet	Provisional	This minor planet was named for...	Ref · Catalog
There are no named minor planets in this number range

== 232201–232300 ==
back to top

Named minor planet	Provisional	This minor planet was named for...	Ref · Catalog
232233 Taihu	2002 LE_{61}	Lake Taihu, the source lake of the Yangtze River Delta, is one of the five major freshwater lakes in China.	IAU · 232233
232259 Georgelawrence	2002 PK_{152}	George B. Lawrence (born 1976), American flight controller for New Horizons.	IAU · 232259

== 232301–232400 ==
back to top

Named minor planet	Provisional	This minor planet was named for...	Ref · Catalog
232306 Bekuška	2002 RP_{280}	Rebecca "Bekuška" Morvay (born 2005) is a daughter of Slovak amateur astronomer Eva Morvayová.	IAU · 232306
232363 Jeanettethorn	2002 XT_{91}	Jeanette C. Thorn (born 1957), American administrative executive and Lead Specialist at Southwest Research Institute.	IAU · 232363

== 232401–232500 ==
back to top

Named minor planet	Provisional	This minor planet was named for...	Ref · Catalog
232409 Dubes	2003 EU_{1}	Alain Dubes (1935–2016), a French amateur astronomer	JPL · 232409

== 232501–232600 ==
back to top

Named minor planet	Provisional	This minor planet was named for...	Ref · Catalog
232553 Randypeterson	2003 SX_{218}	Randy Peterson (born 1948), a visual observer and longtime member of the American East Valley Astronomy Club of Phoenix, Arizona	JPL · 232553

== 232601–232700 ==
back to top

Named minor planet	Provisional	This minor planet was named for...	Ref · Catalog
There are no named minor planets in this number range

== 232701–232800 ==
back to top

Named minor planet	Provisional	This minor planet was named for...	Ref · Catalog
232763 Eliewiesel	2004 PC_{27}	Elie Wiesel (1928–2016), a Romanian-born American Jewish writer, human rights activist and recipient of the 1986 Nobel Prize for Peace	JPL · 232763

== 232801–232900 ==
back to top

Named minor planet	Provisional	This minor planet was named for...	Ref · Catalog
232868 Salmasylla	2004 TS_{354}	Salma Sylla (born 1980), Senegalese astronomer and the first person to earn a PhD in astrophysics in Senegal.	IAU · 232868

== 232901–233000 ==
back to top

Named minor planet	Provisional	This minor planet was named for...	Ref · Catalog
232923 Adalovelace	2005 AA_{29}	Augusta Ada King, Countess of Lovelace (1815–1852), daughter of George Gordon Byron, was an English mathematician and writer known mainly for her work on Babbage's analytical engine.	JPL · 232923
232949 Muhina	2005 EN_{8}	The Museum of Natural History (Muhina) of Fribourg in Switzerland, founded in 1823, assures the conservation of its collections and offers unique information and research possibilities to researchers.	JPL · 232949

back to top

Preceded by 231,001–232,000	Meanings of minor-planet names List of minor planets: 232,001–233,000	Succeeded by 233,001–234,000
