= List of minor planets: 232001–233000 =

The following is a partial list of minor planets, running from minor-planet number 232001 through 233000, inclusive. The primary data for this and other partial lists is based on JPL's "Small-Body Orbital Elements" and data available from the Minor Planet Center. Critical list information is also provided by the MPC, unless otherwise specified from Lowell Observatory. A detailed description of the table's columns and additional sources are given on the main page including a complete list of every page in this series, and a statistical break-up on the dynamical classification of minor planets.

Also see the summary list of all named bodies in numerical and alphabetical order, and the corresponding naming citations for the number range of this particular list. New namings may only be added to this list after official publication, as the preannouncement of names is condemned by the Working Group for Small Bodies Nomenclature of the International Astronomical Union.

Near-Earth obj.	MBA (inner)	MBA (outer)	Centaur
Mars-crosser	MBA (middle)	Jupiter trojan	Trans-Neptunian obj.
Unclassified

== 232001–232100 ==
Designation			Discovery			Properties		Ref
Permanent	Provisional	Named after	Date	Site	Discoverer(s)	Category	Diam.	Ref
232001	2001 SW_{71}	—	September 17, 2001	Socorro	LINEAR	·	1.6 km	MPC · JPL
232002	2001 SE_{88}	—	September 20, 2001	Socorro	LINEAR	·	3.9 km	MPC · JPL
232003	2001 SA_{104}	—	September 20, 2001	Socorro	LINEAR	·	4.2 km	MPC · JPL
232004	2001 SS_{117}	—	September 16, 2001	Socorro	LINEAR	·	1.7 km	MPC · JPL
232005	2001 SP_{122}	—	September 16, 2001	Socorro	LINEAR	·	4.2 km	MPC · JPL
232006	2001 SZ_{127}	—	September 16, 2001	Socorro	LINEAR	·	4.7 km	MPC · JPL
232007	2001 SR_{134}	—	September 16, 2001	Socorro	LINEAR	·	940 m	MPC · JPL
232008	2001 SC_{140}	—	September 16, 2001	Socorro	LINEAR	·	6.6 km	MPC · JPL
232009	2001 SZ_{180}	—	September 19, 2001	Socorro	LINEAR	·	5.1 km	MPC · JPL
232010	2001 SD_{181}	—	September 19, 2001	Socorro	LINEAR	THM	4.4 km	MPC · JPL
232011	2001 SQ_{193}	—	September 19, 2001	Socorro	LINEAR	·	1.0 km	MPC · JPL
232012	2001 SB_{200}	—	September 19, 2001	Socorro	LINEAR	·	1.1 km	MPC · JPL
232013	2001 SJ_{206}	—	September 19, 2001	Socorro	LINEAR	·	1.3 km	MPC · JPL
232014	2001 SV_{245}	—	September 19, 2001	Socorro	LINEAR	·	1.4 km	MPC · JPL
232015	2001 SG_{256}	—	September 19, 2001	Socorro	LINEAR	·	870 m	MPC · JPL
232016	2001 SV_{262}	—	September 24, 2001	Socorro	LINEAR	H	800 m	MPC · JPL
232017	2001 SZ_{264}	—	September 25, 2001	Desert Eagle	W. K. Y. Yeung	MAS	1.0 km	MPC · JPL
232018	2001 SF_{271}	—	September 20, 2001	Socorro	LINEAR	·	4.1 km	MPC · JPL
232019	2001 SE_{301}	—	September 20, 2001	Socorro	LINEAR	·	1.6 km	MPC · JPL
232020	2001 SB_{321}	—	September 23, 2001	Socorro	LINEAR	·	2.3 km	MPC · JPL
232021	2001 SC_{330}	—	September 19, 2001	Socorro	LINEAR	MAS	800 m	MPC · JPL
232022	2001 SJ_{347}	—	September 25, 2001	Socorro	LINEAR	V	920 m	MPC · JPL
232023	2001 TP_{13}	—	October 13, 2001	Bareggio	Pozzoli, V.	·	3.8 km	MPC · JPL
232024	2001 TL_{32}	—	October 14, 2001	Socorro	LINEAR	·	1.8 km	MPC · JPL
232025	2001 TD_{33}	—	October 14, 2001	Socorro	LINEAR	V	1.2 km	MPC · JPL
232026	2001 TT_{41}	—	October 14, 2001	Socorro	LINEAR	·	2.0 km	MPC · JPL
232027	2001 TZ_{42}	—	October 14, 2001	Socorro	LINEAR	·	4.6 km	MPC · JPL
232028	2001 TN_{53}	—	October 13, 2001	Socorro	LINEAR	MAS	930 m	MPC · JPL
232029	2001 TY_{94}	—	October 14, 2001	Socorro	LINEAR	·	1.7 km	MPC · JPL
232030	2001 TY_{95}	—	October 14, 2001	Socorro	LINEAR	·	1.7 km	MPC · JPL
232031	2001 TF_{96}	—	October 14, 2001	Socorro	LINEAR	·	2.6 km	MPC · JPL
232032	2001 TW_{125}	—	October 12, 2001	Haleakala	NEAT	·	1.4 km	MPC · JPL
232033	2001 TA_{144}	—	October 10, 2001	Palomar	NEAT	NYS	1.5 km	MPC · JPL
232034	2001 TL_{148}	—	October 10, 2001	Palomar	NEAT	·	3.8 km	MPC · JPL
232035	2001 TE_{154}	—	October 15, 2001	Palomar	NEAT	(2076)	1.4 km	MPC · JPL
232036	2001 TH_{163}	—	October 11, 2001	Palomar	NEAT	·	1.4 km	MPC · JPL
232037	2001 TL_{187}	—	October 14, 2001	Socorro	LINEAR	·	1.9 km	MPC · JPL
232038	2001 TY_{189}	—	October 14, 2001	Socorro	LINEAR	·	1.8 km	MPC · JPL
232039	2001 TZ_{191}	—	October 14, 2001	Socorro	LINEAR	·	1.7 km	MPC · JPL
232040	2001 TP_{205}	—	October 11, 2001	Socorro	LINEAR	·	1.7 km	MPC · JPL
232041	2001 TR_{217}	—	October 14, 2001	Socorro	LINEAR	·	1.5 km	MPC · JPL
232042	2001 TH_{219}	—	October 14, 2001	Anderson Mesa	LONEOS	·	1.3 km	MPC · JPL
232043	2001 TB_{222}	—	October 14, 2001	Socorro	LINEAR	·	1.5 km	MPC · JPL
232044	2001 TS_{253}	—	October 14, 2001	Apache Point	SDSS	·	3.8 km	MPC · JPL
232045	2001 TB_{258}	—	October 8, 2001	Palomar	NEAT	V	750 m	MPC · JPL
232046	2001 UQ_{2}	—	October 18, 2001	Desert Eagle	W. K. Y. Yeung	·	1.7 km	MPC · JPL
232047	2001 UU_{8}	—	October 17, 2001	Socorro	LINEAR	NYS	1.3 km	MPC · JPL
232048	2001 UB_{11}	—	October 22, 2001	Desert Eagle	W. K. Y. Yeung	·	2.8 km	MPC · JPL
232049	2001 UA_{13}	—	October 24, 2001	Desert Eagle	W. K. Y. Yeung	NYS	1.8 km	MPC · JPL
232050	2001 UG_{26}	—	October 18, 2001	Socorro	LINEAR	·	1.8 km	MPC · JPL
232051	2001 UZ_{28}	—	October 16, 2001	Socorro	LINEAR	·	1.9 km	MPC · JPL
232052	2001 UK_{40}	—	October 17, 2001	Socorro	LINEAR	fast	1.2 km	MPC · JPL
232053	2001 UQ_{72}	—	October 20, 2001	Haleakala	NEAT	PHO	3.1 km	MPC · JPL
232054	2001 UT_{86}	—	October 18, 2001	Kitt Peak	Spacewatch	MAS	820 m	MPC · JPL
232055	2001 UU_{87}	—	October 21, 2001	Kitt Peak	Spacewatch	·	1.3 km	MPC · JPL
232056	2001 UW_{94}	—	October 19, 2001	Haleakala	NEAT	·	2.8 km	MPC · JPL
232057	2001 UB_{98}	—	October 17, 2001	Socorro	LINEAR	MAS	810 m	MPC · JPL
232058	2001 UL_{108}	—	October 20, 2001	Socorro	LINEAR	fast	1.3 km	MPC · JPL
232059	2001 UP_{108}	—	October 20, 2001	Socorro	LINEAR	PHO	1.5 km	MPC · JPL
232060	2001 UF_{118}	—	October 22, 2001	Socorro	LINEAR	·	2.5 km	MPC · JPL
232061	2001 UW_{126}	—	October 17, 2001	Socorro	LINEAR	ERI	3.1 km	MPC · JPL
232062	2001 UA_{144}	—	October 23, 2001	Socorro	LINEAR	·	1.4 km	MPC · JPL
232063	2001 UZ_{150}	—	October 23, 2001	Socorro	LINEAR	·	1.8 km	MPC · JPL
232064	2001 UM_{206}	—	October 20, 2001	Kitt Peak	Spacewatch	NYS	1.2 km	MPC · JPL
232065	2001 UW_{207}	—	October 20, 2001	Socorro	LINEAR	·	4.7 km	MPC · JPL
232066	2001 UN_{220}	—	October 21, 2001	Socorro	LINEAR	·	2.0 km	MPC · JPL
232067	2001 UR_{220}	—	October 21, 2001	Socorro	LINEAR	HYG	4.7 km	MPC · JPL
232068	2001 VM_{2}	—	November 10, 2001	Needville	J. Dellinger, W. G. Dillon	H	630 m	MPC · JPL
232069	2001 VE_{9}	—	November 9, 2001	Socorro	LINEAR	·	4.0 km	MPC · JPL
232070	2001 VA_{17}	—	November 11, 2001	Socorro	LINEAR	·	1.6 km	MPC · JPL
232071	2001 VS_{17}	—	November 9, 2001	Socorro	LINEAR	NYS	1.8 km	MPC · JPL
232072	2001 VE_{19}	—	November 9, 2001	Socorro	LINEAR	·	1.5 km	MPC · JPL
232073	2001 VN_{22}	—	November 9, 2001	Socorro	LINEAR	·	1.3 km	MPC · JPL
232074	2001 VH_{40}	—	November 9, 2001	Socorro	LINEAR	·	2.2 km	MPC · JPL
232075	2001 VZ_{47}	—	November 9, 2001	Socorro	LINEAR	·	3.2 km	MPC · JPL
232076	2001 VS_{53}	—	November 10, 2001	Socorro	LINEAR	·	1.8 km	MPC · JPL
232077	2001 VY_{103}	—	November 12, 2001	Socorro	LINEAR	NYS	1.6 km	MPC · JPL
232078	2001 VV_{104}	—	November 12, 2001	Socorro	LINEAR	MAS	930 m	MPC · JPL
232079	2001 VQ_{113}	—	November 12, 2001	Socorro	LINEAR	EUP	6.6 km	MPC · JPL
232080	2001 VW_{113}	—	November 12, 2001	Socorro	LINEAR	·	3.3 km	MPC · JPL
232081	2001 WD_{14}	—	November 17, 2001	Socorro	LINEAR	·	1.9 km	MPC · JPL
232082	2001 WS_{26}	—	November 17, 2001	Socorro	LINEAR	MAS	960 m	MPC · JPL
232083	2001 WS_{44}	—	November 18, 2001	Socorro	LINEAR	NYS	1.2 km	MPC · JPL
232084	2001 WS_{47}	—	November 19, 2001	Anderson Mesa	LONEOS	EOS	2.9 km	MPC · JPL
232085	2001 WC_{49}	—	November 19, 2001	Kitt Peak	Spacewatch	MAS	860 m	MPC · JPL
232086	2001 WL_{54}	—	November 19, 2001	Socorro	LINEAR	ERI	2.5 km	MPC · JPL
232087	2001 WW_{84}	—	November 20, 2001	Socorro	LINEAR	·	1.8 km	MPC · JPL
232088	2001 WA_{94}	—	November 20, 2001	Socorro	LINEAR	3:2 · SHU	4.4 km	MPC · JPL
232089	2001 WP_{98}	—	November 19, 2001	Anderson Mesa	LONEOS	·	5.9 km	MPC · JPL
232090	2001 XY_{16}	—	December 9, 2001	Socorro	LINEAR	(5)	1.6 km	MPC · JPL
232091	2001 XC_{31}	—	December 9, 2001	Socorro	LINEAR	H	860 m	MPC · JPL
232092	2001 XS_{33}	—	December 7, 2001	Socorro	LINEAR	MAS	1.1 km	MPC · JPL
232093	2001 XV_{46}	—	December 9, 2001	Socorro	LINEAR	·	2.5 km	MPC · JPL
232094	2001 XP_{54}	—	December 10, 2001	Socorro	LINEAR	MAS	980 m	MPC · JPL
232095	2001 XV_{91}	—	December 10, 2001	Socorro	LINEAR	NYS	1.5 km	MPC · JPL
232096	2001 XN_{107}	—	December 10, 2001	Socorro	LINEAR	V	940 m	MPC · JPL
232097	2001 XH_{110}	—	December 11, 2001	Socorro	LINEAR	·	1.4 km	MPC · JPL
232098	2001 XR_{132}	—	December 14, 2001	Socorro	LINEAR	·	2.6 km	MPC · JPL
232099	2001 XY_{133}	—	December 14, 2001	Socorro	LINEAR	·	1.3 km	MPC · JPL
232100	2001 XG_{141}	—	December 14, 2001	Socorro	LINEAR	MAS	880 m	MPC · JPL

== 232101–232200 ==
back to top

Designation			Discovery			Properties		Ref
Permanent	Provisional	Named after	Date	Site	Discoverer(s)	Category	Diam.	Ref
232101	2001 XR_{143}	—	December 14, 2001	Socorro	LINEAR	(5)	1.3 km	MPC · JPL
232102	2001 XV_{178}	—	December 14, 2001	Socorro	LINEAR	·	1.8 km	MPC · JPL
232103	2001 XN_{204}	—	December 11, 2001	Socorro	LINEAR	·	1.6 km	MPC · JPL
232104	2001 XQ_{206}	—	December 11, 2001	Socorro	LINEAR	·	1.8 km	MPC · JPL
232105	2001 XT_{217}	—	December 14, 2001	Socorro	LINEAR	H	650 m	MPC · JPL
232106	2001 XK_{220}	—	December 15, 2001	Socorro	LINEAR	·	1.3 km	MPC · JPL
232107	2001 XP_{224}	—	December 15, 2001	Socorro	LINEAR	·	1.5 km	MPC · JPL
232108	2001 XV_{236}	—	December 15, 2001	Socorro	LINEAR	MAS	1.0 km	MPC · JPL
232109	2001 XS_{253}	—	December 14, 2001	Socorro	LINEAR	·	1.6 km	MPC · JPL
232110	2001 XH_{258}	—	December 8, 2001	Anderson Mesa	LONEOS	·	1.4 km	MPC · JPL
232111	2001 XD_{267}	—	December 9, 2001	Socorro	LINEAR	·	2.0 km	MPC · JPL
232112	2001 YK_{7}	—	December 17, 2001	Socorro	LINEAR	·	1.5 km	MPC · JPL
232113	2001 YN_{35}	—	December 18, 2001	Socorro	LINEAR	(5)	1.7 km	MPC · JPL
232114	2001 YE_{50}	—	December 18, 2001	Socorro	LINEAR	NYS	2.2 km	MPC · JPL
232115	2001 YU_{56}	—	December 18, 2001	Socorro	LINEAR	MAS	980 m	MPC · JPL
232116	2001 YO_{67}	—	December 18, 2001	Socorro	LINEAR	·	1.9 km	MPC · JPL
232117	2001 YN_{88}	—	December 18, 2001	Socorro	LINEAR	·	3.4 km	MPC · JPL
232118	2001 YW_{122}	—	December 17, 2001	Socorro	LINEAR	·	2.5 km	MPC · JPL
232119	2001 YW_{141}	—	December 17, 2001	Socorro	LINEAR	·	1.5 km	MPC · JPL
232120	2001 YC_{146}	—	December 18, 2001	Palomar	NEAT	·	1.6 km	MPC · JPL
232121	2002 AP_{24}	—	January 8, 2002	Palomar	NEAT	·	2.4 km	MPC · JPL
232122	2002 AC_{43}	—	January 9, 2002	Socorro	LINEAR	·	1.7 km	MPC · JPL
232123	2002 AR_{50}	—	January 9, 2002	Socorro	LINEAR	·	1.7 km	MPC · JPL
232124	2002 AK_{85}	—	January 9, 2002	Socorro	LINEAR	V	1.1 km	MPC · JPL
232125	2002 AG_{105}	—	January 9, 2002	Socorro	LINEAR	·	2.5 km	MPC · JPL
232126	2002 AE_{114}	—	January 9, 2002	Socorro	LINEAR	·	3.8 km	MPC · JPL
232127	2002 AU_{134}	—	January 9, 2002	Socorro	LINEAR	·	1.8 km	MPC · JPL
232128	2002 AS_{137}	—	January 9, 2002	Socorro	LINEAR	·	2.1 km	MPC · JPL
232129	2002 AN_{141}	—	January 13, 2002	Socorro	LINEAR	·	2.6 km	MPC · JPL
232130	2002 AZ_{173}	—	January 14, 2002	Socorro	LINEAR	·	2.9 km	MPC · JPL
232131	2002 AO_{184}	—	January 7, 2002	Anderson Mesa	LONEOS	·	1.9 km	MPC · JPL
232132	2002 AQ_{187}	—	January 8, 2002	Haleakala	NEAT	H	870 m	MPC · JPL
232133	2002 BE_{3}	—	January 18, 2002	Anderson Mesa	LONEOS	·	3.0 km	MPC · JPL
232134	2002 BQ_{20}	—	January 23, 2002	Socorro	LINEAR	H	580 m	MPC · JPL
232135	2002 BS_{27}	—	January 20, 2002	Anderson Mesa	LONEOS	V	1.1 km	MPC · JPL
232136	2002 BP_{28}	—	January 19, 2002	Anderson Mesa	LONEOS	·	1.6 km	MPC · JPL
232137	2002 CE_{1}	—	February 2, 2002	Cima Ekar	ADAS	H	660 m	MPC · JPL
232138	2002 CF_{3}	—	February 3, 2002	Palomar	NEAT	·	2.2 km	MPC · JPL
232139	2002 CR_{4}	—	February 3, 2002	Haleakala	NEAT	H	810 m	MPC · JPL
232140	2002 CF_{7}	—	February 1, 2002	Socorro	LINEAR	BAR	1.6 km	MPC · JPL
232141	2002 CR_{13}	—	February 8, 2002	Desert Eagle	W. K. Y. Yeung	·	1.8 km	MPC · JPL
232142	2002 CQ_{16}	—	February 6, 2002	Socorro	LINEAR	·	2.2 km	MPC · JPL
232143	2002 CW_{25}	—	February 10, 2002	Socorro	LINEAR	H	850 m	MPC · JPL
232144	2002 CB_{29}	—	February 6, 2002	Socorro	LINEAR	EUN	1.2 km	MPC · JPL
232145	2002 CX_{45}	—	February 8, 2002	Palomar	NEAT	·	4.3 km	MPC · JPL
232146	2002 CR_{70}	—	February 7, 2002	Socorro	LINEAR	·	1.4 km	MPC · JPL
232147	2002 CC_{148}	—	February 10, 2002	Socorro	LINEAR	AST	2.4 km	MPC · JPL
232148	2002 CG_{148}	—	February 10, 2002	Socorro	LINEAR	V	980 m	MPC · JPL
232149	2002 CL_{175}	—	February 10, 2002	Socorro	LINEAR	·	2.9 km	MPC · JPL
232150	2002 CY_{177}	—	February 10, 2002	Socorro	LINEAR	·	3.6 km	MPC · JPL
232151	2002 CB_{180}	—	February 10, 2002	Socorro	LINEAR	·	5.9 km	MPC · JPL
232152	2002 CD_{188}	—	February 10, 2002	Socorro	LINEAR	·	1.9 km	MPC · JPL
232153	2002 CB_{196}	—	February 10, 2002	Socorro	LINEAR	·	1.5 km	MPC · JPL
232154	2002 CG_{203}	—	February 10, 2002	Socorro	LINEAR	·	2.5 km	MPC · JPL
232155	2002 CF_{220}	—	February 10, 2002	Socorro	LINEAR	·	2.3 km	MPC · JPL
232156	2002 CP_{232}	—	February 10, 2002	Socorro	LINEAR	·	1.4 km	MPC · JPL
232157	2002 CY_{233}	—	February 11, 2002	Socorro	LINEAR	·	2.2 km	MPC · JPL
232158	2002 CG_{245}	—	February 13, 2002	Socorro	LINEAR	·	1.7 km	MPC · JPL
232159	2002 CB_{256}	—	February 4, 2002	Anderson Mesa	LONEOS	RAF	1.7 km	MPC · JPL
232160	2002 CW_{258}	—	February 6, 2002	Anderson Mesa	LONEOS	·	1.8 km	MPC · JPL
232161	2002 CN_{261}	—	February 7, 2002	Haleakala	NEAT	(5)	2.0 km	MPC · JPL
232162	2002 CM_{289}	—	February 10, 2002	Socorro	LINEAR	·	1.8 km	MPC · JPL
232163	2002 CH_{294}	—	February 10, 2002	Socorro	LINEAR	·	1.8 km	MPC · JPL
232164	2002 CT_{299}	—	February 10, 2002	Anderson Mesa	LONEOS	JUN	2.6 km	MPC · JPL
232165	2002 CC_{308}	—	February 10, 2002	Socorro	LINEAR	3:2 · SHU	5.9 km	MPC · JPL
232166	2002 DE_{4}	—	February 21, 2002	Socorro	LINEAR	H	870 m	MPC · JPL
232167	2002 DC_{10}	—	February 19, 2002	Socorro	LINEAR	H	1.1 km	MPC · JPL
232168	2002 EF_{3}	—	March 10, 2002	Haleakala	NEAT	MAR	1.4 km	MPC · JPL
232169	2002 EE_{16}	—	March 6, 2002	Palomar	NEAT	·	1.8 km	MPC · JPL
232170	2002 EP_{22}	—	March 10, 2002	Haleakala	NEAT	·	1.8 km	MPC · JPL
232171	2002 EV_{23}	—	March 5, 2002	Kitt Peak	Spacewatch	·	1.7 km	MPC · JPL
232172	2002 EH_{28}	—	March 9, 2002	Socorro	LINEAR	PHO	1.7 km	MPC · JPL
232173	2002 EQ_{38}	—	March 12, 2002	Kitt Peak	Spacewatch	·	1.2 km	MPC · JPL
232174	2002 EV_{53}	—	March 13, 2002	Socorro	LINEAR	·	2.5 km	MPC · JPL
232175	2002 EA_{55}	—	March 9, 2002	Socorro	LINEAR	·	2.3 km	MPC · JPL
232176	2002 EK_{58}	—	March 13, 2002	Socorro	LINEAR	·	1.4 km	MPC · JPL
232177	2002 ED_{62}	—	March 13, 2002	Socorro	LINEAR	·	1.7 km	MPC · JPL
232178	2002 EV_{64}	—	March 13, 2002	Socorro	LINEAR	·	2.6 km	MPC · JPL
232179	2002 EQ_{65}	—	March 13, 2002	Socorro	LINEAR	KON	3.6 km	MPC · JPL
232180	2002 ET_{65}	—	March 13, 2002	Socorro	LINEAR	MAR	1.6 km	MPC · JPL
232181	2002 EP_{68}	—	March 13, 2002	Socorro	LINEAR	·	2.9 km	MPC · JPL
232182	2002 ET_{73}	—	March 13, 2002	Socorro	LINEAR	·	1.9 km	MPC · JPL
232183	2002 ET_{87}	—	March 9, 2002	Socorro	LINEAR	·	2.2 km	MPC · JPL
232184	2002 EP_{102}	—	March 6, 2002	Palomar	NEAT	·	4.5 km	MPC · JPL
232185	2002 EW_{121}	—	March 12, 2002	Palomar	NEAT	·	1.6 km	MPC · JPL
232186	2002 EZ_{125}	—	March 12, 2002	Kitt Peak	Spacewatch	·	1.2 km	MPC · JPL
232187	2002 EM_{138}	—	March 12, 2002	Palomar	NEAT	(5)	1.2 km	MPC · JPL
232188	2002 EG_{139}	—	March 12, 2002	Kitt Peak	Spacewatch	(5)	1.7 km	MPC · JPL
232189	2002 FM_{4}	—	March 20, 2002	Desert Eagle	W. K. Y. Yeung	·	5.1 km	MPC · JPL
232190	2002 FZ_{22}	—	March 17, 2002	Kitt Peak	Spacewatch	·	2.9 km	MPC · JPL
232191	2002 FK_{25}	—	March 19, 2002	Palomar	NEAT	·	3.1 km	MPC · JPL
232192	2002 FP_{37}	—	March 31, 2002	Palomar	NEAT	·	2.1 km	MPC · JPL
232193	2002 FY_{37}	—	March 31, 2002	Palomar	NEAT	·	1.7 km	MPC · JPL
232194	2002 GJ	—	April 2, 2002	Palomar	NEAT	·	1.9 km	MPC · JPL
232195	2002 GG_{2}	—	April 4, 2002	Palomar	NEAT	H	890 m	MPC · JPL
232196	2002 GR_{17}	—	April 15, 2002	Socorro	LINEAR	·	4.0 km	MPC · JPL
232197	2002 GT_{54}	—	April 5, 2002	Palomar	NEAT	BRG	1.9 km	MPC · JPL
232198	2002 GX_{59}	—	April 8, 2002	Palomar	NEAT	·	4.7 km	MPC · JPL
232199	2002 GS_{60}	—	April 8, 2002	Palomar	NEAT	EUN	1.7 km	MPC · JPL
232200	2002 GX_{63}	—	April 8, 2002	Palomar	NEAT	·	1.3 km	MPC · JPL

== 232201–232300 ==
back to top

Designation			Discovery			Properties		Ref
Permanent	Provisional	Named after	Date	Site	Discoverer(s)	Category	Diam.	Ref
232201	2002 GM_{90}	—	April 8, 2002	Kitt Peak	Spacewatch	·	1.5 km	MPC · JPL
232202	2002 GP_{90}	—	April 8, 2002	Palomar	NEAT	·	1.9 km	MPC · JPL
232203	2002 GY_{100}	—	April 10, 2002	Socorro	LINEAR	·	1.7 km	MPC · JPL
232204	2002 GX_{104}	—	April 10, 2002	Socorro	LINEAR	EUN	1.5 km	MPC · JPL
232205	2002 GK_{106}	—	April 11, 2002	Anderson Mesa	LONEOS	ADE	4.0 km	MPC · JPL
232206	2002 GN_{107}	—	April 11, 2002	Socorro	LINEAR	·	1.7 km	MPC · JPL
232207	2002 GO_{111}	—	April 10, 2002	Socorro	LINEAR	·	2.4 km	MPC · JPL
232208	2002 GM_{123}	—	April 11, 2002	Palomar	NEAT	·	2.6 km	MPC · JPL
232209	2002 GC_{142}	—	April 13, 2002	Palomar	NEAT	·	1.9 km	MPC · JPL
232210	2002 GP_{144}	—	April 11, 2002	Palomar	NEAT	·	3.7 km	MPC · JPL
232211	2002 GR_{147}	—	April 13, 2002	Palomar	NEAT	(5)	2.3 km	MPC · JPL
232212	2002 GD_{166}	—	April 15, 2002	Anderson Mesa	LONEOS	ADE	3.7 km	MPC · JPL
232213	2002 GT_{168}	—	April 9, 2002	Socorro	LINEAR	·	1.7 km	MPC · JPL
232214	2002 HK_{11}	—	April 22, 2002	Palomar	NEAT	·	1.7 km	MPC · JPL
232215	2002 HS_{11}	—	April 22, 2002	Socorro	LINEAR	·	4.1 km	MPC · JPL
232216	2002 HV_{11}	—	April 22, 2002	Socorro	LINEAR	·	3.2 km	MPC · JPL
232217	2002 HF_{13}	—	April 22, 2002	Socorro	LINEAR	·	4.3 km	MPC · JPL
232218	2002 HZ_{14}	—	April 17, 2002	Socorro	LINEAR	·	1.5 km	MPC · JPL
232219	2002 JN_{9}	—	May 7, 2002	Kitt Peak	Spacewatch	·	1.5 km	MPC · JPL
232220	2002 JZ_{31}	—	May 9, 2002	Socorro	LINEAR	·	1.3 km	MPC · JPL
232221	2002 JF_{99}	—	May 13, 2002	Palomar	NEAT	·	3.6 km	MPC · JPL
232222	2002 JG_{99}	—	May 13, 2002	Palomar	NEAT	EUN	2.2 km	MPC · JPL
232223	2002 JP_{120}	—	May 5, 2002	Palomar	NEAT	EUN	1.7 km	MPC · JPL
232224	2002 JX_{120}	—	May 5, 2002	Palomar	NEAT	·	2.9 km	MPC · JPL
232225	2002 JZ_{121}	—	May 5, 2002	Palomar	NEAT	EUN	2.3 km	MPC · JPL
232226	2002 JS_{134}	—	May 9, 2002	Palomar	NEAT	·	2.7 km	MPC · JPL
232227	2002 JX_{135}	—	May 9, 2002	Palomar	NEAT	·	1.7 km	MPC · JPL
232228	2002 KG_{14}	—	May 30, 2002	Palomar	NEAT	·	3.0 km	MPC · JPL
232229	2002 KL_{15}	—	May 30, 2002	Palomar	NEAT	·	2.3 km	MPC · JPL
232230	2002 LP_{2}	—	June 1, 2002	Socorro	LINEAR	·	1.9 km	MPC · JPL
232231	2002 LD_{21}	—	June 6, 2002	Socorro	LINEAR	·	3.4 km	MPC · JPL
232232	2002 LM_{53}	—	June 9, 2002	Palomar	NEAT	·	3.1 km	MPC · JPL
232233 Taihu	2002 LE_{61}	Taihu	June 2, 2002	Palomar	NEAT	·	2.9 km	MPC · JPL
232234	2002 NL_{5}	—	July 10, 2002	Campo Imperatore	CINEOS	·	4.1 km	MPC · JPL
232235	2002 NT_{14}	—	July 5, 2002	Socorro	LINEAR	·	3.8 km	MPC · JPL
232236	2002 NO_{19}	—	July 9, 2002	Socorro	LINEAR	·	3.8 km	MPC · JPL
232237	2002 NK_{37}	—	July 9, 2002	Socorro	LINEAR	·	1.8 km	MPC · JPL
232238	2002 NA_{45}	—	July 12, 2002	Palomar	NEAT	·	1.8 km	MPC · JPL
232239	2002 ND_{60}	—	July 4, 2002	Palomar	NEAT	·	2.5 km	MPC · JPL
232240	2002 NG_{66}	—	July 9, 2002	Palomar	NEAT	·	2.2 km	MPC · JPL
232241	2002 OA_{7}	—	July 20, 2002	Palomar	NEAT	·	6.2 km	MPC · JPL
232242	2002 OH_{8}	—	July 18, 2002	Palomar	NEAT	EUP	6.9 km	MPC · JPL
232243	2002 OG_{27}	—	July 22, 2002	Palomar	NEAT	·	2.1 km	MPC · JPL
232244	2002 PU_{2}	—	August 3, 2002	Palomar	NEAT	·	3.9 km	MPC · JPL
232245	2002 PZ_{4}	—	August 4, 2002	Palomar	NEAT	·	5.6 km	MPC · JPL
232246	2002 PT_{14}	—	August 6, 2002	Palomar	NEAT	·	3.0 km	MPC · JPL
232247	2002 PJ_{19}	—	August 6, 2002	Palomar	NEAT	EOS	2.4 km	MPC · JPL
232248	2002 PB_{20}	—	August 6, 2002	Palomar	NEAT	·	3.3 km	MPC · JPL
232249	2002 PT_{24}	—	August 6, 2002	Palomar	NEAT	·	4.6 km	MPC · JPL
232250	2002 PG_{31}	—	August 6, 2002	Palomar	NEAT	·	4.2 km	MPC · JPL
232251	2002 PO_{62}	—	August 8, 2002	Palomar	NEAT	THM	2.9 km	MPC · JPL
232252	2002 PZ_{65}	—	August 5, 2002	Campo Imperatore	CINEOS	EUP	5.5 km	MPC · JPL
232253	2002 PC_{70}	—	August 11, 2002	Socorro	LINEAR	·	3.0 km	MPC · JPL
232254	2002 PP_{107}	—	August 13, 2002	Palomar	NEAT	EOS	2.6 km	MPC · JPL
232255	2002 PY_{121}	—	August 13, 2002	Anderson Mesa	LONEOS	PHO	1.5 km	MPC · JPL
232256	2002 PA_{131}	—	August 6, 2002	Palomar	NEAT	·	2.7 km	MPC · JPL
232257	2002 PT_{135}	—	August 14, 2002	Socorro	LINEAR	·	3.4 km	MPC · JPL
232258	2002 PU_{136}	—	August 15, 2002	Anderson Mesa	LONEOS	·	2.7 km	MPC · JPL
232259 Georgelawrence	2002 PK_{152}	Georgelawrence	August 10, 2002	Cerro Tololo	M. W. Buie	·	3.8 km	MPC · JPL
232260	2002 PA_{161}	—	August 8, 2002	Palomar	S. F. Hönig	·	2.9 km	MPC · JPL
232261	2002 PZ_{162}	—	August 8, 2002	Palomar	S. F. Hönig	HOF	4.7 km	MPC · JPL
232262	2002 PD_{163}	—	August 8, 2002	Palomar	S. F. Hönig	·	2.7 km	MPC · JPL
232263	2002 QV_{11}	—	August 26, 2002	Palomar	NEAT	EUP	5.8 km	MPC · JPL
232264	2002 QZ_{19}	—	August 28, 2002	Palomar	NEAT	·	5.6 km	MPC · JPL
232265	2002 QY_{26}	—	August 27, 2002	Palomar	NEAT	·	2.6 km	MPC · JPL
232266	2002 QM_{38}	—	August 30, 2002	Kitt Peak	Spacewatch	·	3.0 km	MPC · JPL
232267	2002 QS_{49}	—	August 29, 2002	Palomar	R. Matson	·	2.7 km	MPC · JPL
232268	2002 QH_{51}	—	August 16, 2002	Palomar	Lowe, A.	BRA	2.5 km	MPC · JPL
232269	2002 QG_{77}	—	August 17, 2002	Palomar	NEAT	·	2.3 km	MPC · JPL
232270	2002 QD_{79}	—	August 16, 2002	Palomar	NEAT	·	2.2 km	MPC · JPL
232271	2002 QE_{93}	—	August 19, 2002	Palomar	NEAT	EOS	2.6 km	MPC · JPL
232272	2002 QS_{99}	—	August 19, 2002	Palomar	NEAT	TEL	1.9 km	MPC · JPL
232273	2002 QR_{103}	—	August 17, 2002	Palomar	NEAT	·	4.5 km	MPC · JPL
232274	2002 QU_{103}	—	August 19, 2002	Palomar	NEAT	·	3.4 km	MPC · JPL
232275	2002 QN_{136}	—	August 18, 2002	Palomar	NEAT	KOR	1.8 km	MPC · JPL
232276	2002 QC_{138}	—	August 17, 2002	Palomar	NEAT	THM	2.4 km	MPC · JPL
232277	2002 RW	—	September 1, 2002	Haleakala	NEAT	·	5.8 km	MPC · JPL
232278	2002 RQ_{20}	—	September 4, 2002	Anderson Mesa	LONEOS	·	870 m	MPC · JPL
232279	2002 RV_{41}	—	September 5, 2002	Socorro	LINEAR	·	3.7 km	MPC · JPL
232280	2002 RB_{59}	—	September 5, 2002	Anderson Mesa	LONEOS	·	6.0 km	MPC · JPL
232281	2002 RK_{73}	—	September 5, 2002	Socorro	LINEAR	·	5.1 km	MPC · JPL
232282	2002 RS_{73}	—	September 5, 2002	Socorro	LINEAR	·	2.5 km	MPC · JPL
232283	2002 RD_{74}	—	September 5, 2002	Socorro	LINEAR	·	3.3 km	MPC · JPL
232284	2002 RE_{128}	—	September 10, 2002	Palomar	NEAT	·	6.7 km	MPC · JPL
232285	2002 RK_{129}	—	September 11, 2002	Palomar	NEAT	·	4.4 km	MPC · JPL
232286	2002 RU_{129}	—	September 10, 2002	Palomar	NEAT	EUP	5.5 km	MPC · JPL
232287	2002 RV_{138}	—	September 10, 2002	Palomar	NEAT	EOS	3.0 km	MPC · JPL
232288	2002 RO_{165}	—	September 13, 2002	Palomar	NEAT	·	4.1 km	MPC · JPL
232289	2002 RT_{178}	—	September 14, 2002	Kitt Peak	Spacewatch	·	4.6 km	MPC · JPL
232290	2002 RE_{180}	—	September 14, 2002	Kitt Peak	Spacewatch	·	3.5 km	MPC · JPL
232291	2002 RR_{181}	—	September 13, 2002	Goodricke-Pigott	R. A. Tucker	·	1.1 km	MPC · JPL
232292	2002 RD_{192}	—	September 12, 2002	Palomar	NEAT	·	6.7 km	MPC · JPL
232293	2002 RJ_{193}	—	September 12, 2002	Palomar	NEAT	EOS	3.0 km	MPC · JPL
232294	2002 RK_{198}	—	September 13, 2002	Palomar	NEAT	THM	3.3 km	MPC · JPL
232295	2002 RC_{202}	—	September 13, 2002	Haleakala	NEAT	KOR	2.1 km	MPC · JPL
232296	2002 RU_{232}	—	September 11, 2002	Palomar	White, M., M. Collins	·	3.6 km	MPC · JPL
232297	2002 RL_{233}	—	September 14, 2002	Palomar	R. Matson	KOR	1.7 km	MPC · JPL
232298	2002 RN_{236}	—	September 12, 2002	Palomar	R. Matson	·	3.3 km	MPC · JPL
232299	2002 RC_{245}	—	September 12, 2002	Palomar	NEAT	·	1.0 km	MPC · JPL
232300	2002 RC_{246}	—	September 1, 2002	Palomar	NEAT	KOR	1.7 km	MPC · JPL

== 232301–232400 ==
back to top

Designation			Discovery			Properties		Ref
Permanent	Provisional	Named after	Date	Site	Discoverer(s)	Category	Diam.	Ref
232301	2002 RT_{249}	—	September 14, 2002	Palomar	NEAT	KOR	1.7 km	MPC · JPL
232302	2002 RY_{249}	—	September 9, 2002	Palomar	NEAT	·	4.7 km	MPC · JPL
232303	2002 RN_{250}	—	September 13, 2002	Palomar	NEAT	EOS	2.2 km	MPC · JPL
232304	2002 RW_{263}	—	September 5, 2002	Apache Point	SDSS	·	3.7 km	MPC · JPL
232305	2002 RA_{272}	—	September 1, 2002	Palomar	NEAT	·	2.2 km	MPC · JPL
232306 Bekuška	2002 RP_{280}	Bekuška	September 14, 2002	Palomar	NEAT	·	830 m	MPC · JPL
232307	2002 SN_{14}	—	September 27, 2002	Palomar	NEAT	KOR	2.3 km	MPC · JPL
232308	2002 TH_{24}	—	October 2, 2002	Socorro	LINEAR	·	3.8 km	MPC · JPL
232309	2002 TO_{31}	—	October 2, 2002	Socorro	LINEAR	·	690 m	MPC · JPL
232310	2002 TH_{34}	—	October 2, 2002	Socorro	LINEAR	·	4.2 km	MPC · JPL
232311	2002 TD_{37}	—	October 2, 2002	Socorro	LINEAR	·	990 m	MPC · JPL
232312	2002 TS_{73}	—	October 3, 2002	Palomar	NEAT	·	2.1 km	MPC · JPL
232313	2002 TN_{74}	—	October 1, 2002	Anderson Mesa	LONEOS	·	4.4 km	MPC · JPL
232314	2002 TL_{93}	—	October 3, 2002	Palomar	NEAT	EOS	3.1 km	MPC · JPL
232315	2002 TM_{94}	—	October 3, 2002	Socorro	LINEAR	HYG	3.3 km	MPC · JPL
232316	2002 TY_{98}	—	October 3, 2002	Socorro	LINEAR	THM	2.6 km	MPC · JPL
232317	2002 TV_{101}	—	October 4, 2002	Socorro	LINEAR	HYG	3.6 km	MPC · JPL
232318	2002 TL_{103}	—	October 4, 2002	Socorro	LINEAR	EUP	6.4 km	MPC · JPL
232319	2002 TL_{105}	—	October 4, 2002	Anderson Mesa	LONEOS	EOS	5.7 km	MPC · JPL
232320	2002 TZ_{112}	—	October 3, 2002	Palomar	NEAT	EOS	2.7 km	MPC · JPL
232321	2002 TM_{113}	—	October 3, 2002	Palomar	NEAT	·	4.8 km	MPC · JPL
232322	2002 TR_{128}	—	October 4, 2002	Palomar	NEAT	EOS	2.7 km	MPC · JPL
232323	2002 TA_{138}	—	October 4, 2002	Anderson Mesa	LONEOS	·	1.3 km	MPC · JPL
232324	2002 TN_{142}	—	October 3, 2002	Socorro	LINEAR	·	5.5 km	MPC · JPL
232325	2002 TH_{149}	—	October 5, 2002	Palomar	NEAT	·	2.2 km	MPC · JPL
232326	2002 TV_{150}	—	October 5, 2002	Palomar	NEAT	HYG	3.5 km	MPC · JPL
232327	2002 TU_{163}	—	October 5, 2002	Palomar	NEAT	TIR	4.1 km	MPC · JPL
232328	2002 TK_{169}	—	October 3, 2002	Palomar	NEAT	·	5.7 km	MPC · JPL
232329	2002 TV_{169}	—	October 3, 2002	Palomar	NEAT	·	4.9 km	MPC · JPL
232330	2002 TY_{182}	—	October 4, 2002	Socorro	LINEAR	·	3.3 km	MPC · JPL
232331	2002 TT_{186}	—	October 4, 2002	Socorro	LINEAR	·	1.0 km	MPC · JPL
232332	2002 TZ_{187}	—	October 4, 2002	Socorro	LINEAR	EOS	2.6 km	MPC · JPL
232333	2002 TJ_{189}	—	October 5, 2002	Socorro	LINEAR	·	4.1 km	MPC · JPL
232334	2002 TL_{202}	—	October 4, 2002	Socorro	LINEAR	·	3.4 km	MPC · JPL
232335	2002 TN_{202}	—	October 4, 2002	Socorro	LINEAR	EOS	3.2 km	MPC · JPL
232336	2002 TV_{289}	—	October 10, 2002	Socorro	LINEAR	TIN	3.6 km	MPC · JPL
232337	2002 TL_{296}	—	October 11, 2002	Socorro	LINEAR	·	5.4 km	MPC · JPL
232338	2002 TH_{298}	—	October 12, 2002	Socorro	LINEAR	·	2.0 km	MPC · JPL
232339	2002 TM_{312}	—	October 4, 2002	Apache Point	SDSS	·	4.2 km	MPC · JPL
232340	2002 TP_{338}	—	October 5, 2002	Apache Point	SDSS	HYG	3.5 km	MPC · JPL
232341	2002 TE_{348}	—	October 5, 2002	Apache Point	SDSS	·	4.9 km	MPC · JPL
232342	2002 TE_{379}	—	October 5, 2002	Palomar	NEAT	·	3.1 km	MPC · JPL
232343	2002 UR_{39}	—	October 31, 2002	Palomar	NEAT	THM	3.4 km	MPC · JPL
232344	2002 UD_{53}	—	October 29, 2002	Apache Point	SDSS	VER	4.3 km	MPC · JPL
232345	2002 UX_{72}	—	October 20, 2002	Palomar	NEAT	·	4.1 km	MPC · JPL
232346	2002 VR_{22}	—	November 5, 2002	Socorro	LINEAR	EOS	3.2 km	MPC · JPL
232347	2002 VQ_{40}	—	November 6, 2002	Haleakala	NEAT	·	990 m	MPC · JPL
232348	2002 VA_{60}	—	November 3, 2002	Haleakala	NEAT	·	5.5 km	MPC · JPL
232349	2002 VS_{67}	—	November 8, 2002	Socorro	LINEAR	·	1.1 km	MPC · JPL
232350	2002 VR_{79}	—	November 7, 2002	Socorro	LINEAR	·	1.6 km	MPC · JPL
232351	2002 VM_{120}	—	November 12, 2002	Palomar	NEAT	VER	3.5 km	MPC · JPL
232352	2002 VB_{143}	—	November 12, 2002	Palomar	NEAT	·	910 m	MPC · JPL
232353	2002 WR_{2}	—	November 23, 2002	Palomar	NEAT	NAE	5.0 km	MPC · JPL
232354	2002 WO_{15}	—	November 28, 2002	Anderson Mesa	LONEOS	·	880 m	MPC · JPL
232355	2002 WC_{20}	—	November 25, 2002	Palomar	S. F. Hönig	·	3.4 km	MPC · JPL
232356	2002 WB_{23}	—	November 24, 2002	Palomar	NEAT	·	3.3 km	MPC · JPL
232357	2002 XT_{16}	—	December 3, 2002	Palomar	NEAT	·	5.4 km	MPC · JPL
232358	2002 XW_{49}	—	December 10, 2002	Socorro	LINEAR	NAE	4.9 km	MPC · JPL
232359	2002 XS_{52}	—	December 10, 2002	Socorro	LINEAR	·	2.8 km	MPC · JPL
232360	2002 XB_{67}	—	December 10, 2002	Palomar	NEAT	·	5.1 km	MPC · JPL
232361	2002 XC_{70}	—	December 10, 2002	Palomar	NEAT	LIX	5.2 km	MPC · JPL
232362	2002 XG_{87}	—	December 11, 2002	Socorro	LINEAR	·	1.0 km	MPC · JPL
232363 Jeanettethorn	2002 XT_{91}	Jeanettethorn	December 4, 2002	Kitt Peak	M. W. Buie	·	970 m	MPC · JPL
232364	2002 XW_{103}	—	December 5, 2002	Socorro	LINEAR	·	1.1 km	MPC · JPL
232365	2002 XN_{109}	—	December 6, 2002	Socorro	LINEAR	·	860 m	MPC · JPL
232366	2002 YX_{26}	—	December 31, 2002	Socorro	LINEAR	·	860 m	MPC · JPL
232367	2003 AZ_{1}	—	January 2, 2003	Socorro	LINEAR	·	1.0 km	MPC · JPL
232368	2003 AZ_{2}	—	January 2, 2003	Socorro	LINEAR	AMO	770 m	MPC · JPL
232369	2003 AV_{20}	—	January 5, 2003	Socorro	LINEAR	·	1.2 km	MPC · JPL
232370	2003 AS_{22}	—	January 5, 2003	Anderson Mesa	LONEOS	PHO	1.8 km	MPC · JPL
232371	2003 AO_{25}	—	January 4, 2003	Socorro	LINEAR	·	1.2 km	MPC · JPL
232372	2003 AQ_{34}	—	January 7, 2003	Socorro	LINEAR	·	1.2 km	MPC · JPL
232373	2003 AF_{62}	—	January 8, 2003	Socorro	LINEAR	·	1.1 km	MPC · JPL
232374	2003 AA_{87}	—	January 1, 2003	Socorro	LINEAR	·	1.1 km	MPC · JPL
232375	2003 AA_{90}	—	January 4, 2003	Socorro	LINEAR	URS	6.6 km	MPC · JPL
232376	2003 BU	—	January 24, 2003	Palomar	NEAT	PHO	3.9 km	MPC · JPL
232377	2003 BN_{13}	—	January 26, 2003	Palomar	NEAT	·	1.9 km	MPC · JPL
232378	2003 BJ_{15}	—	January 26, 2003	Haleakala	NEAT	·	1.1 km	MPC · JPL
232379	2003 BT_{17}	—	January 27, 2003	Socorro	LINEAR	·	1.2 km	MPC · JPL
232380	2003 BD_{33}	—	January 27, 2003	Socorro	LINEAR	·	1.3 km	MPC · JPL
232381	2003 BP_{43}	—	January 27, 2003	Socorro	LINEAR	·	1.1 km	MPC · JPL
232382	2003 BT_{47}	—	January 31, 2003	Socorro	LINEAR	AMO +1km	1.1 km	MPC · JPL
232383	2003 BV_{49}	—	January 27, 2003	Anderson Mesa	LONEOS	·	1.2 km	MPC · JPL
232384	2003 BW_{49}	—	January 27, 2003	Anderson Mesa	LONEOS	·	1.3 km	MPC · JPL
232385	2003 BS_{51}	—	January 27, 2003	Socorro	LINEAR	·	930 m	MPC · JPL
232386	2003 BA_{54}	—	January 27, 2003	Anderson Mesa	LONEOS	·	1.7 km	MPC · JPL
232387	2003 BM_{58}	—	January 27, 2003	Socorro	LINEAR	·	1.2 km	MPC · JPL
232388	2003 BN_{61}	—	January 27, 2003	Haleakala	NEAT	·	1.2 km	MPC · JPL
232389	2003 BP_{62}	—	January 28, 2003	Palomar	NEAT	(2076)	1.1 km	MPC · JPL
232390	2003 BU_{67}	—	January 27, 2003	Socorro	LINEAR	NYS	1.3 km	MPC · JPL
232391	2003 BC_{84}	—	January 31, 2003	Socorro	LINEAR	·	1.3 km	MPC · JPL
232392	2003 BF_{85}	—	January 31, 2003	Socorro	LINEAR	·	820 m	MPC · JPL
232393	2003 BB_{88}	—	January 27, 2003	Socorro	LINEAR	T_{j} (2.99) · HIL · 3:2	6.1 km	MPC · JPL
232394	2003 BK_{88}	—	January 27, 2003	Anderson Mesa	LONEOS	·	6.6 km	MPC · JPL
232395	2003 BU_{89}	—	January 28, 2003	Socorro	LINEAR	·	2.3 km	MPC · JPL
232396	2003 CD	—	February 1, 2003	Socorro	LINEAR	·	2.3 km	MPC · JPL
232397	2003 CX_{3}	—	February 3, 2003	Socorro	LINEAR	PHO	2.2 km	MPC · JPL
232398	2003 CB_{6}	—	February 1, 2003	Socorro	LINEAR	·	2.5 km	MPC · JPL
232399	2003 CA_{9}	—	February 2, 2003	Anderson Mesa	LONEOS	·	1.1 km	MPC · JPL
232400	2003 CE_{9}	—	February 2, 2003	Socorro	LINEAR	·	2.5 km	MPC · JPL

== 232401–232500 ==
back to top

Designation			Discovery			Properties		Ref
Permanent	Provisional	Named after	Date	Site	Discoverer(s)	Category	Diam.	Ref
232401	2003 CR_{12}	—	February 2, 2003	Palomar	NEAT	(2076)	1.8 km	MPC · JPL
232402	2003 CG_{16}	—	February 7, 2003	Palomar	NEAT	T_{j} (2.98) · HIL · 3:2	6.1 km	MPC · JPL
232403	2003 CB_{25}	—	February 4, 2003	Socorro	LINEAR	·	1.4 km	MPC · JPL
232404	2003 DZ_{1}	—	February 21, 2003	Palomar	NEAT	·	1.1 km	MPC · JPL
232405	2003 DH_{11}	—	February 23, 2003	Kitt Peak	Spacewatch	·	970 m	MPC · JPL
232406	2003 DA_{19}	—	February 21, 2003	Palomar	NEAT	·	1.8 km	MPC · JPL
232407	2003 DD_{22}	—	February 28, 2003	Socorro	LINEAR	·	1.8 km	MPC · JPL
232408	2003 EY	—	March 5, 2003	Socorro	LINEAR	·	1.2 km	MPC · JPL
232409 Dubes	2003 EU_{1}	Dubes	March 4, 2003	St. Véran	St. Veran	·	1.7 km	MPC · JPL
232410	2003 EQ_{2}	—	March 5, 2003	Socorro	LINEAR	·	2.1 km	MPC · JPL
232411	2003 EB_{3}	—	March 6, 2003	Socorro	LINEAR	·	990 m	MPC · JPL
232412	2003 EL_{3}	—	March 6, 2003	Socorro	LINEAR	V	970 m	MPC · JPL
232413	2003 EO_{3}	—	March 6, 2003	Socorro	LINEAR	·	1.6 km	MPC · JPL
232414	2003 EH_{9}	—	March 6, 2003	Socorro	LINEAR	·	2.8 km	MPC · JPL
232415	2003 EM_{9}	—	March 6, 2003	Anderson Mesa	LONEOS	NYS	1.7 km	MPC · JPL
232416	2003 EH_{12}	—	March 6, 2003	Socorro	LINEAR	·	1.4 km	MPC · JPL
232417	2003 EU_{17}	—	March 6, 2003	Cima Ekar	ADAS	·	1.5 km	MPC · JPL
232418	2003 EQ_{26}	—	March 6, 2003	Anderson Mesa	LONEOS	·	1.4 km	MPC · JPL
232419	2003 EP_{28}	—	March 6, 2003	Socorro	LINEAR	·	3.0 km	MPC · JPL
232420	2003 EF_{40}	—	March 8, 2003	Kitt Peak	Spacewatch	·	1.6 km	MPC · JPL
232421	2003 EZ_{42}	—	March 10, 2003	Socorro	LINEAR	·	1.7 km	MPC · JPL
232422	2003 EQ_{47}	—	March 9, 2003	Anderson Mesa	LONEOS	·	1.4 km	MPC · JPL
232423	2003 EP_{48}	—	March 9, 2003	Socorro	LINEAR	NYS	1.5 km	MPC · JPL
232424	2003 EQ_{55}	—	March 9, 2003	Kitt Peak	Spacewatch	NYS	1.5 km	MPC · JPL
232425	2003 ES_{63}	—	March 13, 2003	Kitt Peak	Spacewatch	·	1.5 km	MPC · JPL
232426	2003 FR_{1}	—	March 24, 2003	Socorro	LINEAR	·	4.5 km	MPC · JPL
232427	2003 FD_{15}	—	March 23, 2003	Catalina	CSS	·	1.3 km	MPC · JPL
232428	2003 FC_{19}	—	March 24, 2003	Kitt Peak	Spacewatch	·	1.4 km	MPC · JPL
232429	2003 FM_{21}	—	March 24, 2003	Haleakala	NEAT	·	2.1 km	MPC · JPL
232430	2003 FJ_{26}	—	March 24, 2003	Kitt Peak	Spacewatch	V	1.1 km	MPC · JPL
232431	2003 FH_{36}	—	March 23, 2003	Kitt Peak	Spacewatch	MAS	770 m	MPC · JPL
232432	2003 FW_{40}	—	March 25, 2003	Palomar	NEAT	·	1.5 km	MPC · JPL
232433	2003 FL_{50}	—	March 25, 2003	Palomar	NEAT	NYS	1.3 km	MPC · JPL
232434	2003 FJ_{56}	—	March 26, 2003	Palomar	NEAT	NYS	1.7 km	MPC · JPL
232435	2003 FP_{62}	—	March 26, 2003	Kitt Peak	Spacewatch	·	1.5 km	MPC · JPL
232436	2003 FB_{65}	—	March 26, 2003	Palomar	NEAT	·	2.7 km	MPC · JPL
232437	2003 FH_{65}	—	March 26, 2003	Palomar	NEAT	·	1.4 km	MPC · JPL
232438	2003 FH_{71}	—	March 26, 2003	Kitt Peak	Spacewatch	·	1.6 km	MPC · JPL
232439	2003 FE_{72}	—	March 26, 2003	Palomar	NEAT	·	1.6 km	MPC · JPL
232440	2003 FB_{78}	—	March 27, 2003	Catalina	CSS	·	1.4 km	MPC · JPL
232441	2003 FX_{81}	—	March 27, 2003	Kitt Peak	Spacewatch	NYS	1.2 km	MPC · JPL
232442	2003 FU_{89}	—	March 29, 2003	Anderson Mesa	LONEOS	V	1.1 km	MPC · JPL
232443	2003 FQ_{93}	—	March 29, 2003	Socorro	LINEAR	·	3.7 km	MPC · JPL
232444	2003 FA_{100}	—	March 31, 2003	Kitt Peak	Spacewatch	·	1.5 km	MPC · JPL
232445	2003 FV_{100}	—	March 31, 2003	Anderson Mesa	LONEOS	·	1.5 km	MPC · JPL
232446	2003 FY_{114}	—	March 31, 2003	Socorro	LINEAR	NYS	1.5 km	MPC · JPL
232447	2003 FP_{120}	—	March 24, 2003	Kitt Peak	Spacewatch	·	1.1 km	MPC · JPL
232448	2003 FR_{121}	—	March 25, 2003	Anderson Mesa	LONEOS	·	1.5 km	MPC · JPL
232449	2003 FX_{127}	—	March 31, 2003	Catalina	CSS	·	1.8 km	MPC · JPL
232450	2003 GG_{7}	—	April 1, 2003	Socorro	LINEAR	NYS	1.3 km	MPC · JPL
232451	2003 GJ_{8}	—	April 3, 2003	Anderson Mesa	LONEOS	NYS	1.6 km	MPC · JPL
232452	2003 GQ_{10}	—	April 3, 2003	Haleakala	NEAT	PHO	1.4 km	MPC · JPL
232453	2003 GO_{12}	—	April 1, 2003	Socorro	LINEAR	NYS	1.1 km	MPC · JPL
232454	2003 GN_{13}	—	April 3, 2003	Anderson Mesa	LONEOS	·	1.9 km	MPC · JPL
232455	2003 GO_{13}	—	April 4, 2003	Kitt Peak	Spacewatch	·	1.8 km	MPC · JPL
232456	2003 GJ_{36}	—	April 5, 2003	Socorro	LINEAR	·	1.2 km	MPC · JPL
232457	2003 GM_{36}	—	April 5, 2003	Kitt Peak	Spacewatch	·	960 m	MPC · JPL
232458	2003 GE_{40}	—	April 9, 2003	Socorro	LINEAR	·	1.5 km	MPC · JPL
232459	2003 GM_{40}	—	April 9, 2003	Palomar	NEAT	·	1.2 km	MPC · JPL
232460	2003 GK_{43}	—	April 9, 2003	Socorro	LINEAR	·	1.8 km	MPC · JPL
232461	2003 GD_{51}	—	April 8, 2003	Haleakala	NEAT	NYS	1.4 km	MPC · JPL
232462	2003 HH_{3}	—	April 24, 2003	Anderson Mesa	LONEOS	·	1.4 km	MPC · JPL
232463	2003 HQ_{7}	—	April 24, 2003	Anderson Mesa	LONEOS	MAS	900 m	MPC · JPL
232464	2003 HN_{9}	—	April 24, 2003	Anderson Mesa	LONEOS	·	1.6 km	MPC · JPL
232465	2003 HP_{14}	—	April 26, 2003	Haleakala	NEAT	·	1.3 km	MPC · JPL
232466	2003 HT_{14}	—	April 26, 2003	Haleakala	NEAT	V	1.0 km	MPC · JPL
232467	2003 HG_{17}	—	April 25, 2003	Anderson Mesa	LONEOS	·	1.7 km	MPC · JPL
232468	2003 HT_{20}	—	April 24, 2003	Anderson Mesa	LONEOS	·	1.6 km	MPC · JPL
232469	2003 HL_{32}	—	April 28, 2003	Anderson Mesa	LONEOS	·	5.0 km	MPC · JPL
232470	2003 HR_{37}	—	April 28, 2003	Anderson Mesa	LONEOS	·	1.4 km	MPC · JPL
232471	2003 HE_{38}	—	April 29, 2003	Socorro	LINEAR	V	1.0 km	MPC · JPL
232472	2003 HW_{47}	—	April 30, 2003	Kitt Peak	Spacewatch	·	1.7 km	MPC · JPL
232473	2003 HS_{51}	—	April 30, 2003	Haleakala	NEAT	·	2.0 km	MPC · JPL
232474	2003 JN_{1}	—	May 1, 2003	Socorro	LINEAR	·	1.5 km	MPC · JPL
232475	2003 JP_{7}	—	May 2, 2003	Socorro	LINEAR	·	1.9 km	MPC · JPL
232476	2003 JS_{13}	—	May 5, 2003	Anderson Mesa	LONEOS	V	1.0 km	MPC · JPL
232477	2003 JW_{14}	—	May 5, 2003	Socorro	LINEAR	·	3.3 km	MPC · JPL
232478	2003 KF_{3}	—	May 23, 2003	Kitt Peak	Spacewatch	·	2.2 km	MPC · JPL
232479	2003 KZ_{8}	—	May 25, 2003	Anderson Mesa	LONEOS	·	1.7 km	MPC · JPL
232480	2003 KE_{18}	—	May 28, 2003	Kitt Peak	Spacewatch	·	1.8 km	MPC · JPL
232481	2003 LF_{2}	—	June 1, 2003	Kitt Peak	Spacewatch	MAS	1.0 km	MPC · JPL
232482	2003 LD_{3}	—	June 1, 2003	Kitt Peak	Spacewatch	MAS	900 m	MPC · JPL
232483	2003 MC_{3}	—	June 25, 2003	Socorro	LINEAR	PHO	2.5 km	MPC · JPL
232484	2003 MS_{4}	—	June 26, 2003	Socorro	LINEAR	·	2.0 km	MPC · JPL
232485	2003 MJ_{5}	—	June 26, 2003	Socorro	LINEAR	·	3.0 km	MPC · JPL
232486	2003 NN	—	July 1, 2003	Socorro	LINEAR	·	2.5 km	MPC · JPL
232487	2003 NE_{12}	—	July 3, 2003	Kitt Peak	Spacewatch	·	1.5 km	MPC · JPL
232488	2003 OW_{3}	—	July 22, 2003	Campo Imperatore	CINEOS	ADE	3.2 km	MPC · JPL
232489	2003 OO_{5}	—	July 23, 2003	Socorro	LINEAR	·	2.8 km	MPC · JPL
232490	2003 OR_{6}	—	July 23, 2003	Palomar	NEAT	H	800 m	MPC · JPL
232491	2003 OB_{22}	—	July 29, 2003	Socorro	LINEAR	(32418)	3.6 km	MPC · JPL
232492	2003 OJ_{27}	—	July 24, 2003	Palomar	NEAT	·	2.6 km	MPC · JPL
232493	2003 OQ_{27}	—	July 24, 2003	Palomar	NEAT	·	2.8 km	MPC · JPL
232494	2003 OG_{31}	—	July 30, 2003	Socorro	LINEAR	·	6.7 km	MPC · JPL
232495	2003 PT	—	August 1, 2003	Socorro	LINEAR	·	3.6 km	MPC · JPL
232496	2003 PV_{6}	—	August 1, 2003	Socorro	LINEAR	·	1.7 km	MPC · JPL
232497	2003 PW_{7}	—	August 2, 2003	Haleakala	NEAT	·	2.6 km	MPC · JPL
232498	2003 QT_{5}	—	August 19, 2003	Wise	Polishook, D.	·	2.9 km	MPC · JPL
232499	2003 QP_{7}	—	August 21, 2003	Palomar	NEAT	GEF	1.8 km	MPC · JPL
232500	2003 QF_{13}	—	August 22, 2003	Haleakala	NEAT	GEF	2.0 km	MPC · JPL

== 232501–232600 ==
back to top

Designation			Discovery			Properties		Ref
Permanent	Provisional	Named after	Date	Site	Discoverer(s)	Category	Diam.	Ref
232501	2003 QM_{21}	—	August 22, 2003	Palomar	NEAT	·	2.4 km	MPC · JPL
232502	2003 QH_{25}	—	August 22, 2003	Palomar	NEAT	·	2.8 km	MPC · JPL
232503	2003 QF_{27}	—	August 23, 2003	Campo Imperatore	CINEOS	·	1.9 km	MPC · JPL
232504	2003 QU_{37}	—	August 22, 2003	Socorro	LINEAR	·	2.1 km	MPC · JPL
232505	2003 QY_{37}	—	August 22, 2003	Socorro	LINEAR	·	2.7 km	MPC · JPL
232506	2003 QA_{47}	—	August 24, 2003	Socorro	LINEAR	·	6.0 km	MPC · JPL
232507	2003 QK_{60}	—	August 23, 2003	Socorro	LINEAR	·	2.5 km	MPC · JPL
232508	2003 QW_{74}	—	August 24, 2003	Socorro	LINEAR	·	4.0 km	MPC · JPL
232509	2003 QK_{75}	—	August 24, 2003	Socorro	LINEAR	·	3.8 km	MPC · JPL
232510	2003 QR_{76}	—	August 24, 2003	Socorro	LINEAR	·	3.0 km	MPC · JPL
232511	2003 QS_{81}	—	August 23, 2003	Palomar	NEAT	·	2.7 km	MPC · JPL
232512	2003 QS_{90}	—	August 28, 2003	Haleakala	NEAT	H	760 m	MPC · JPL
232513	2003 QF_{95}	—	August 29, 2003	Haleakala	NEAT	·	3.7 km	MPC · JPL
232514	2003 QX_{97}	—	August 30, 2003	Kitt Peak	Spacewatch	·	1.5 km	MPC · JPL
232515	2003 QU_{103}	—	August 31, 2003	Haleakala	NEAT	·	3.4 km	MPC · JPL
232516	2003 QW_{104}	—	August 29, 2003	Haleakala	NEAT	·	3.2 km	MPC · JPL
232517	2003 QX_{109}	—	August 27, 2003	Palomar	NEAT	EUP	4.5 km	MPC · JPL
232518	2003 RN_{2}	—	September 1, 2003	Socorro	LINEAR	·	2.6 km	MPC · JPL
232519	2003 RG_{6}	—	September 1, 2003	Socorro	LINEAR	PAD	3.4 km	MPC · JPL
232520	2003 RG_{15}	—	September 15, 2003	Haleakala	NEAT	·	4.9 km	MPC · JPL
232521	2003 RM_{18}	—	September 15, 2003	Anderson Mesa	LONEOS	EOS	2.6 km	MPC · JPL
232522	2003 RP_{25}	—	September 15, 2003	Palomar	NEAT	·	5.4 km	MPC · JPL
232523	2003 SU_{1}	—	September 16, 2003	Kitt Peak	Spacewatch	·	2.6 km	MPC · JPL
232524	2003 SY_{11}	—	September 16, 2003	Kitt Peak	Spacewatch	AST	2.4 km	MPC · JPL
232525	2003 SZ_{12}	—	September 16, 2003	Kitt Peak	Spacewatch	EOS ·	4.9 km	MPC · JPL
232526	2003 SV_{13}	—	September 16, 2003	Kitt Peak	Spacewatch	·	3.2 km	MPC · JPL
232527	2003 SB_{16}	—	September 17, 2003	Kitt Peak	Spacewatch	·	3.5 km	MPC · JPL
232528	2003 SZ_{19}	—	September 16, 2003	Kitt Peak	Spacewatch	KOR	1.8 km	MPC · JPL
232529	2003 SG_{20}	—	September 16, 2003	Kitt Peak	Spacewatch	·	4.5 km	MPC · JPL
232530	2003 ST_{25}	—	September 17, 2003	Kitt Peak	Spacewatch	·	3.5 km	MPC · JPL
232531	2003 SL_{30}	—	September 18, 2003	Kitt Peak	Spacewatch	KOR	1.5 km	MPC · JPL
232532	2003 SW_{38}	—	September 16, 2003	Palomar	NEAT	·	4.4 km	MPC · JPL
232533	2003 SC_{43}	—	September 16, 2003	Anderson Mesa	LONEOS	·	4.7 km	MPC · JPL
232534	2003 SC_{61}	—	September 17, 2003	Socorro	LINEAR	·	3.9 km	MPC · JPL
232535	2003 SF_{62}	—	September 17, 2003	Kitt Peak	Spacewatch	·	3.2 km	MPC · JPL
232536	2003 SZ_{72}	—	September 18, 2003	Kitt Peak	Spacewatch	·	3.3 km	MPC · JPL
232537	2003 SO_{75}	—	September 18, 2003	Kitt Peak	Spacewatch	·	2.9 km	MPC · JPL
232538	2003 SV_{87}	—	September 17, 2003	Haleakala	NEAT	·	2.7 km	MPC · JPL
232539	2003 SG_{103}	—	September 20, 2003	Socorro	LINEAR	AGN	1.9 km	MPC · JPL
232540	2003 SV_{108}	—	September 20, 2003	Palomar	NEAT	·	3.0 km	MPC · JPL
232541	2003 SU_{118}	—	September 16, 2003	Kitt Peak	Spacewatch	WIT	1.5 km	MPC · JPL
232542	2003 SW_{119}	—	September 17, 2003	Kitt Peak	Spacewatch	AGN	1.4 km	MPC · JPL
232543	2003 SF_{129}	—	September 20, 2003	Črni Vrh	Skvarč, J.	·	3.8 km	MPC · JPL
232544	2003 SR_{151}	—	September 18, 2003	Palomar	NEAT	EOS	3.1 km	MPC · JPL
232545	2003 SM_{173}	—	September 18, 2003	Socorro	LINEAR	·	2.8 km	MPC · JPL
232546	2003 SJ_{178}	—	September 19, 2003	Palomar	NEAT	EOS	3.7 km	MPC · JPL
232547	2003 SW_{178}	—	September 19, 2003	Socorro	LINEAR	AGN	1.8 km	MPC · JPL
232548	2003 SR_{190}	—	September 17, 2003	Kitt Peak	Spacewatch	NEM	3.0 km	MPC · JPL
232549	2003 SO_{200}	—	September 22, 2003	Socorro	LINEAR	H	1.0 km	MPC · JPL
232550	2003 SP_{200}	—	September 24, 2003	Socorro	LINEAR	·	5.7 km	MPC · JPL
232551	2003 SJ_{206}	—	September 24, 2003	Palomar	NEAT	·	3.6 km	MPC · JPL
232552	2003 SD_{209}	—	September 24, 2003	Palomar	NEAT	·	2.8 km	MPC · JPL
232553 Randypeterson	2003 SX_{218}	Randypeterson	September 26, 2003	Junk Bond	D. Healy	HOF	4.2 km	MPC · JPL
232554	2003 SZ_{222}	—	September 27, 2003	Socorro	LINEAR	·	6.2 km	MPC · JPL
232555	2003 SA_{236}	—	September 26, 2003	Socorro	LINEAR	AGN	1.7 km	MPC · JPL
232556	2003 SK_{242}	—	September 27, 2003	Kitt Peak	Spacewatch	·	2.3 km	MPC · JPL
232557	2003 SD_{248}	—	September 26, 2003	Socorro	LINEAR	·	3.2 km	MPC · JPL
232558	2003 SX_{252}	—	September 27, 2003	Anderson Mesa	LONEOS	AGN	1.8 km	MPC · JPL
232559	2003 SO_{271}	—	September 25, 2003	Haleakala	NEAT	·	3.1 km	MPC · JPL
232560	2003 SN_{274}	—	September 28, 2003	Socorro	LINEAR	·	4.5 km	MPC · JPL
232561	2003 SS_{274}	—	September 28, 2003	Kitt Peak	Spacewatch	·	3.7 km	MPC · JPL
232562	2003 SE_{275}	—	September 29, 2003	Socorro	LINEAR	·	5.9 km	MPC · JPL
232563	2003 SB_{279}	—	September 30, 2003	Kitt Peak	Spacewatch	MRX	1.5 km	MPC · JPL
232564	2003 SQ_{286}	—	September 21, 2003	Palomar	NEAT	EUN	2.2 km	MPC · JPL
232565	2003 SU_{288}	—	September 28, 2003	Socorro	LINEAR	·	2.5 km	MPC · JPL
232566	2003 SA_{290}	—	September 28, 2003	Anderson Mesa	LONEOS	·	3.2 km	MPC · JPL
232567	2003 SY_{292}	—	September 27, 2003	Socorro	LINEAR	·	3.2 km	MPC · JPL
232568	2003 SW_{295}	—	September 29, 2003	Anderson Mesa	LONEOS	LIX	5.4 km	MPC · JPL
232569	2003 SH_{300}	—	September 17, 2003	Palomar	NEAT	·	3.6 km	MPC · JPL
232570	2003 SX_{302}	—	September 17, 2003	Palomar	NEAT	·	2.9 km	MPC · JPL
232571	2003 SJ_{308}	—	September 28, 2003	Socorro	LINEAR	H	870 m	MPC · JPL
232572	2003 SE_{313}	—	September 17, 2003	Palomar	NEAT	·	4.5 km	MPC · JPL
232573	2003 SB_{322}	—	September 26, 2003	Apache Point	SDSS	VER	5.7 km	MPC · JPL
232574	2003 SH_{324}	—	September 17, 2003	Kitt Peak	Spacewatch	AGN	1.5 km	MPC · JPL
232575	2003 SK_{333}	—	September 25, 2003	Palomar	NEAT	GEF	2.1 km	MPC · JPL
232576	2003 ST_{337}	—	September 18, 2003	Kitt Peak	Spacewatch	·	5.0 km	MPC · JPL
232577	2003 SK_{338}	—	September 26, 2003	Apache Point	SDSS	AGN	1.5 km	MPC · JPL
232578	2003 SQ_{344}	—	September 17, 2003	Kitt Peak	Spacewatch	·	2.4 km	MPC · JPL
232579	2003 SM_{351}	—	September 19, 2003	Palomar	NEAT	HOF	4.9 km	MPC · JPL
232580	2003 SZ_{356}	—	September 18, 2003	Bergisch Gladbach	W. Bickel	EUN	3.4 km	MPC · JPL
232581	2003 SF_{363}	—	September 22, 2003	Kitt Peak	Spacewatch	KOR	1.6 km	MPC · JPL
232582	2003 SA_{412}	—	September 28, 2003	Apache Point	SDSS	AGN	1.2 km	MPC · JPL
232583	2003 SA_{414}	—	September 28, 2003	Apache Point	SDSS	KOR	1.5 km	MPC · JPL
232584	2003 TX_{13}	—	October 13, 2003	Palomar	NEAT	H	810 m	MPC · JPL
232585	2003 TQ_{14}	—	October 14, 2003	Anderson Mesa	LONEOS	·	5.6 km	MPC · JPL
232586	2003 TK_{30}	—	October 1, 2003	Kitt Peak	Spacewatch	·	5.3 km	MPC · JPL
232587	2003 TK_{38}	—	October 2, 2003	Kitt Peak	Spacewatch	·	5.5 km	MPC · JPL
232588	2003 TL_{51}	—	October 5, 2003	Socorro	LINEAR	·	4.3 km	MPC · JPL
232589	2003 TO_{51}	—	October 5, 2003	Socorro	LINEAR	BRA	2.4 km	MPC · JPL
232590	2003 TA_{53}	—	October 5, 2003	Kitt Peak	Spacewatch	·	2.4 km	MPC · JPL
232591	2003 TE_{55}	—	October 5, 2003	Kitt Peak	Spacewatch	·	3.5 km	MPC · JPL
232592	2003 UZ_{1}	—	October 16, 2003	Kitt Peak	Spacewatch	·	2.3 km	MPC · JPL
232593	2003 UU_{4}	—	October 17, 2003	Socorro	LINEAR	·	4.5 km	MPC · JPL
232594	2003 UJ_{9}	—	October 18, 2003	Socorro	LINEAR	T_{j} (2.98) · EUP	6.9 km	MPC · JPL
232595	2003 UP_{9}	—	October 20, 2003	Wrightwood	J. W. Young	ADE	3.5 km	MPC · JPL
232596	2003 UR_{24}	—	October 23, 2003	Socorro	LINEAR	H	1.1 km	MPC · JPL
232597	2003 UT_{49}	—	October 16, 2003	Palomar	NEAT	·	4.8 km	MPC · JPL
232598	2003 UN_{52}	—	October 18, 2003	Palomar	NEAT	URS	5.5 km	MPC · JPL
232599	2003 UY_{52}	—	October 18, 2003	Palomar	NEAT	TRE	5.3 km	MPC · JPL
232600	2003 UC_{54}	—	October 18, 2003	Palomar	NEAT	·	2.7 km	MPC · JPL

== 232601–232700 ==
back to top

Designation			Discovery			Properties		Ref
Permanent	Provisional	Named after	Date	Site	Discoverer(s)	Category	Diam.	Ref
232601	2003 UZ_{55}	—	October 17, 2003	Kitt Peak	Spacewatch	·	3.4 km	MPC · JPL
232602	2003 UX_{71}	—	October 19, 2003	Kitt Peak	Spacewatch	·	3.3 km	MPC · JPL
232603	2003 UZ_{71}	—	October 19, 2003	Kitt Peak	Spacewatch	·	3.2 km	MPC · JPL
232604	2003 UK_{75}	—	October 17, 2003	Anderson Mesa	LONEOS	NEM	3.5 km	MPC · JPL
232605	2003 UB_{76}	—	October 17, 2003	Kitt Peak	Spacewatch	HOF	4.2 km	MPC · JPL
232606	2003 UH_{86}	—	October 18, 2003	Palomar	NEAT	·	3.2 km	MPC · JPL
232607	2003 UD_{92}	—	October 20, 2003	Kitt Peak	Spacewatch	·	4.1 km	MPC · JPL
232608	2003 US_{93}	—	October 18, 2003	Kitt Peak	Spacewatch	KOR	1.8 km	MPC · JPL
232609	2003 UJ_{96}	—	October 18, 2003	Kitt Peak	Spacewatch	·	2.8 km	MPC · JPL
232610	2003 UY_{99}	—	October 19, 2003	Palomar	NEAT	·	3.1 km	MPC · JPL
232611	2003 UQ_{111}	—	October 20, 2003	Kitt Peak	Spacewatch	·	2.3 km	MPC · JPL
232612	2003 UL_{118}	—	October 17, 2003	Kitt Peak	Spacewatch	·	5.9 km	MPC · JPL
232613	2003 UX_{118}	—	October 18, 2003	Kitt Peak	Spacewatch	·	5.4 km	MPC · JPL
232614	2003 UD_{122}	—	October 19, 2003	Anderson Mesa	LONEOS	·	4.0 km	MPC · JPL
232615	2003 UJ_{126}	—	October 20, 2003	Palomar	NEAT	·	3.2 km	MPC · JPL
232616	2003 UY_{134}	—	October 20, 2003	Palomar	NEAT	·	4.5 km	MPC · JPL
232617	2003 UY_{148}	—	October 19, 2003	Anderson Mesa	LONEOS	·	2.5 km	MPC · JPL
232618	2003 UV_{150}	—	October 21, 2003	Anderson Mesa	LONEOS	EOS	2.9 km	MPC · JPL
232619	2003 UO_{151}	—	October 21, 2003	Socorro	LINEAR	·	3.1 km	MPC · JPL
232620	2003 UR_{153}	—	October 19, 2003	Anderson Mesa	LONEOS	·	2.7 km	MPC · JPL
232621	2003 UR_{163}	—	October 21, 2003	Socorro	LINEAR	·	3.7 km	MPC · JPL
232622	2003 UJ_{170}	—	October 22, 2003	Kitt Peak	Spacewatch	·	3.3 km	MPC · JPL
232623	2003 UH_{171}	—	October 19, 2003	Kitt Peak	Spacewatch	·	2.7 km	MPC · JPL
232624	2003 UK_{171}	—	October 19, 2003	Kitt Peak	Spacewatch	·	1.9 km	MPC · JPL
232625	2003 UQ_{177}	—	October 21, 2003	Palomar	NEAT	·	3.2 km	MPC · JPL
232626	2003 UO_{179}	—	October 21, 2003	Socorro	LINEAR	AGN	2.0 km	MPC · JPL
232627	2003 UU_{189}	—	October 22, 2003	Haleakala	NEAT	·	4.0 km	MPC · JPL
232628	2003 UY_{198}	—	October 21, 2003	Socorro	LINEAR	·	2.9 km	MPC · JPL
232629	2003 US_{201}	—	October 21, 2003	Socorro	LINEAR	·	2.3 km	MPC · JPL
232630	2003 UH_{205}	—	October 22, 2003	Socorro	LINEAR	·	2.9 km	MPC · JPL
232631	2003 UU_{211}	—	October 23, 2003	Kitt Peak	Spacewatch	·	2.5 km	MPC · JPL
232632	2003 UY_{221}	—	October 22, 2003	Kitt Peak	Spacewatch	·	4.6 km	MPC · JPL
232633	2003 UB_{225}	—	October 22, 2003	Kitt Peak	Spacewatch	·	4.1 km	MPC · JPL
232634	2003 UO_{225}	—	October 22, 2003	Kitt Peak	Spacewatch	VER	3.8 km	MPC · JPL
232635	2003 UO_{229}	—	October 23, 2003	Anderson Mesa	LONEOS	AGN	1.7 km	MPC · JPL
232636	2003 UY_{248}	—	October 25, 2003	Socorro	LINEAR	·	4.5 km	MPC · JPL
232637	2003 UO_{250}	—	October 25, 2003	Socorro	LINEAR	·	3.6 km	MPC · JPL
232638	2003 UU_{256}	—	October 25, 2003	Socorro	LINEAR	·	3.6 km	MPC · JPL
232639	2003 UC_{276}	—	October 29, 2003	Catalina	CSS	·	4.5 km	MPC · JPL
232640	2003 UA_{293}	—	October 21, 2003	Anderson Mesa	LONEOS	·	6.4 km	MPC · JPL
232641	2003 UK_{296}	—	October 16, 2003	Kitt Peak	Spacewatch	·	3.1 km	MPC · JPL
232642	2003 UQ_{304}	—	October 18, 2003	Kitt Peak	Spacewatch	·	4.9 km	MPC · JPL
232643	2003 UX_{309}	—	October 20, 2003	Palomar	NEAT	·	3.6 km	MPC · JPL
232644	2003 UR_{355}	—	October 19, 2003	Kitt Peak	Spacewatch	·	2.7 km	MPC · JPL
232645	2003 UG_{372}	—	October 22, 2003	Apache Point	SDSS	·	2.8 km	MPC · JPL
232646	2003 UV_{377}	—	October 22, 2003	Apache Point	SDSS	NEM	2.6 km	MPC · JPL
232647	2003 UT_{416}	—	October 21, 2003	Palomar	NEAT	EOS	2.5 km	MPC · JPL
232648	2003 VJ_{10}	—	November 15, 2003	Palomar	NEAT	·	3.4 km	MPC · JPL
232649	2003 WC_{1}	—	November 16, 2003	Catalina	CSS	·	4.2 km	MPC · JPL
232650	2003 WY_{4}	—	November 16, 2003	Kitt Peak	Spacewatch	·	2.7 km	MPC · JPL
232651	2003 WG_{15}	—	November 16, 2003	Kitt Peak	Spacewatch	·	4.5 km	MPC · JPL
232652	2003 WE_{17}	—	November 18, 2003	Palomar	NEAT	EOS	5.0 km	MPC · JPL
232653	2003 WW_{18}	—	November 19, 2003	Socorro	LINEAR	·	3.1 km	MPC · JPL
232654	2003 WQ_{19}	—	November 19, 2003	Socorro	LINEAR	DOR	2.9 km	MPC · JPL
232655	2003 WM_{20}	—	November 19, 2003	Socorro	LINEAR	·	3.5 km	MPC · JPL
232656	2003 WM_{29}	—	November 18, 2003	Kitt Peak	Spacewatch	EOS	2.8 km	MPC · JPL
232657	2003 WV_{37}	—	November 19, 2003	Socorro	LINEAR	LIX	4.6 km	MPC · JPL
232658	2003 WR_{43}	—	November 19, 2003	Palomar	NEAT	·	3.5 km	MPC · JPL
232659	2003 WP_{44}	—	November 19, 2003	Palomar	NEAT	·	2.8 km	MPC · JPL
232660	2003 WN_{46}	—	November 18, 2003	Palomar	NEAT	·	6.6 km	MPC · JPL
232661	2003 WU_{73}	—	November 20, 2003	Socorro	LINEAR	·	6.4 km	MPC · JPL
232662	2003 WH_{125}	—	November 20, 2003	Socorro	LINEAR	HYG	3.6 km	MPC · JPL
232663	2003 WE_{126}	—	November 20, 2003	Socorro	LINEAR	·	3.1 km	MPC · JPL
232664	2003 WM_{140}	—	November 21, 2003	Socorro	LINEAR	·	4.4 km	MPC · JPL
232665	2003 WA_{161}	—	November 30, 2003	Kitt Peak	Spacewatch	·	3.3 km	MPC · JPL
232666	2003 WQ_{163}	—	November 30, 2003	Kitt Peak	Spacewatch	·	2.5 km	MPC · JPL
232667	2003 WV_{171}	—	November 29, 2003	Socorro	LINEAR	EUP	6.1 km	MPC · JPL
232668	2003 XJ_{2}	—	December 1, 2003	Socorro	LINEAR	·	2.5 km	MPC · JPL
232669	2003 XV_{12}	—	December 14, 2003	Palomar	NEAT	·	3.6 km	MPC · JPL
232670	2003 XN_{16}	—	December 14, 2003	Palomar	NEAT	·	3.2 km	MPC · JPL
232671	2003 XO_{18}	—	December 15, 2003	Palomar	NEAT	EOS	2.7 km	MPC · JPL
232672	2003 XF_{41}	—	December 14, 2003	Kitt Peak	Spacewatch	·	2.5 km	MPC · JPL
232673	2003 YU_{32}	—	December 16, 2003	Kitt Peak	Spacewatch	·	3.2 km	MPC · JPL
232674	2003 YF_{45}	—	December 21, 2003	Sandlot	Sandlot	EOS	3.3 km	MPC · JPL
232675	2003 YB_{55}	—	December 19, 2003	Socorro	LINEAR	·	5.2 km	MPC · JPL
232676	2003 YZ_{58}	—	December 19, 2003	Socorro	LINEAR	·	2.4 km	MPC · JPL
232677	2003 YG_{65}	—	December 19, 2003	Socorro	LINEAR	·	5.4 km	MPC · JPL
232678	2003 YD_{77}	—	December 18, 2003	Socorro	LINEAR	·	5.2 km	MPC · JPL
232679	2003 YC_{99}	—	December 19, 2003	Socorro	LINEAR	EOS	3.5 km	MPC · JPL
232680	2003 YO_{115}	—	December 27, 2003	Kitt Peak	Spacewatch	HYG	5.0 km	MPC · JPL
232681	2003 YO_{116}	—	December 27, 2003	Kitt Peak	Spacewatch	·	4.3 km	MPC · JPL
232682	2003 YR_{119}	—	December 27, 2003	Socorro	LINEAR	·	4.2 km	MPC · JPL
232683	2003 YR_{132}	—	December 28, 2003	Socorro	LINEAR	·	5.7 km	MPC · JPL
232684	2003 YN_{133}	—	December 28, 2003	Socorro	LINEAR	·	3.6 km	MPC · JPL
232685	2003 YR_{140}	—	December 28, 2003	Socorro	LINEAR	·	4.7 km	MPC · JPL
232686	2003 YR_{143}	—	December 28, 2003	Socorro	LINEAR	·	3.3 km	MPC · JPL
232687	2003 YL_{151}	—	December 29, 2003	Catalina	CSS	EUP	8.0 km	MPC · JPL
232688	2003 YQ_{152}	—	December 29, 2003	Kitt Peak	Spacewatch	·	5.6 km	MPC · JPL
232689	2003 YN_{158}	—	December 17, 2003	Socorro	LINEAR	·	7.0 km	MPC · JPL
232690	2003 YJ_{180}	—	December 21, 2003	Socorro	LINEAR	·	3.2 km	MPC · JPL
232691	2004 AR_{1}	—	January 13, 2004	Socorro	LINEAR	APO · PHA	380 m	MPC · JPL
232692	2004 AM_{6}	—	January 15, 2004	Kitt Peak	Spacewatch	·	5.4 km	MPC · JPL
232693	2004 AU_{8}	—	January 14, 2004	Palomar	NEAT	·	7.2 km	MPC · JPL
232694	2004 AC_{26}	—	January 13, 2004	Anderson Mesa	LONEOS	·	3.7 km	MPC · JPL
232695	2004 AU_{26}	—	January 13, 2004	Palomar	NEAT	·	3.9 km	MPC · JPL
232696	2004 BD	—	January 16, 2004	Palomar	NEAT	·	5.0 km	MPC · JPL
232697	2004 BA_{13}	—	January 17, 2004	Palomar	NEAT	·	3.3 km	MPC · JPL
232698	2004 BT_{13}	—	January 17, 2004	Palomar	NEAT	·	4.8 km	MPC · JPL
232699	2004 BS_{14}	—	January 16, 2004	Palomar	NEAT	·	4.4 km	MPC · JPL
232700	2004 BZ_{14}	—	January 16, 2004	Palomar	NEAT	·	3.9 km	MPC · JPL

== 232701–232800 ==
back to top

Designation			Discovery			Properties		Ref
Permanent	Provisional	Named after	Date	Site	Discoverer(s)	Category	Diam.	Ref
232701	2004 BC_{20}	—	January 18, 2004	Palomar	NEAT	·	5.1 km	MPC · JPL
232702	2004 BW_{27}	—	January 18, 2004	Palomar	NEAT	·	890 m	MPC · JPL
232703	2004 BV_{29}	—	January 18, 2004	Palomar	NEAT	·	3.8 km	MPC · JPL
232704	2004 BY_{35}	—	January 19, 2004	Kitt Peak	Spacewatch	·	4.2 km	MPC · JPL
232705	2004 BE_{48}	—	January 21, 2004	Socorro	LINEAR	·	3.6 km	MPC · JPL
232706	2004 BO_{48}	—	January 21, 2004	Socorro	LINEAR	·	3.5 km	MPC · JPL
232707	2004 BV_{49}	—	January 21, 2004	Socorro	LINEAR	·	6.6 km	MPC · JPL
232708	2004 BF_{53}	—	January 22, 2004	Socorro	LINEAR	·	2.6 km	MPC · JPL
232709	2004 BN_{59}	—	January 24, 2004	Socorro	LINEAR	·	2.6 km	MPC · JPL
232710	2004 BY_{71}	—	January 23, 2004	Socorro	LINEAR	·	3.7 km	MPC · JPL
232711	2004 BP_{73}	—	January 24, 2004	Socorro	LINEAR	·	6.9 km	MPC · JPL
232712	2004 BK_{76}	—	January 24, 2004	Socorro	LINEAR	·	5.2 km	MPC · JPL
232713	2004 BP_{90}	—	January 24, 2004	Socorro	LINEAR	LIX	6.2 km	MPC · JPL
232714	2004 BX_{91}	—	January 26, 2004	Anderson Mesa	LONEOS	HYG	3.3 km	MPC · JPL
232715	2004 BP_{92}	—	January 27, 2004	Anderson Mesa	LONEOS	·	7.0 km	MPC · JPL
232716	2004 BU_{98}	—	January 27, 2004	Kitt Peak	Spacewatch	·	4.9 km	MPC · JPL
232717	2004 BQ_{120}	—	January 31, 2004	Socorro	LINEAR	·	5.6 km	MPC · JPL
232718	2004 BC_{126}	—	January 16, 2004	Kitt Peak	Spacewatch	·	3.3 km	MPC · JPL
232719	2004 BN_{142}	—	January 19, 2004	Catalina	CSS	THM	3.1 km	MPC · JPL
232720	2004 CG_{3}	—	February 9, 2004	Palomar	NEAT	·	3.0 km	MPC · JPL
232721	2004 CC_{6}	—	February 10, 2004	Catalina	CSS	EOS	2.7 km	MPC · JPL
232722	2004 CA_{11}	—	February 11, 2004	Palomar	NEAT	·	3.4 km	MPC · JPL
232723	2004 CC_{32}	—	February 12, 2004	Kitt Peak	Spacewatch	·	3.8 km	MPC · JPL
232724	2004 CA_{57}	—	February 11, 2004	Anderson Mesa	LONEOS	·	5.7 km	MPC · JPL
232725	2004 CY_{57}	—	February 14, 2004	Socorro	LINEAR	EOS	5.5 km	MPC · JPL
232726	2004 CK_{65}	—	February 14, 2004	Haleakala	NEAT	CYB	4.8 km	MPC · JPL
232727	2004 CU_{115}	—	February 11, 2004	Kitt Peak	Spacewatch	THM	2.9 km	MPC · JPL
232728	2004 DP_{6}	—	February 16, 2004	Kitt Peak	Spacewatch	·	2.3 km	MPC · JPL
232729	2004 DQ_{16}	—	February 18, 2004	Kitt Peak	Spacewatch	·	980 m	MPC · JPL
232730	2004 EX_{9}	—	March 11, 2004	Palomar	NEAT	·	4.5 km	MPC · JPL
232731	2004 EH_{15}	—	March 11, 2004	Palomar	NEAT	EOS	3.2 km	MPC · JPL
232732	2004 EO_{15}	—	March 12, 2004	Palomar	NEAT	·	5.1 km	MPC · JPL
232733	2004 ES_{43}	—	March 10, 2004	Palomar	NEAT	·	4.6 km	MPC · JPL
232734	2004 EQ_{73}	—	March 15, 2004	Kitt Peak	Spacewatch	·	2.8 km	MPC · JPL
232735	2004 FB_{27}	—	March 17, 2004	Kitt Peak	Spacewatch	·	1.1 km	MPC · JPL
232736	2004 FD_{28}	—	March 17, 2004	Socorro	LINEAR	PHO	1.6 km	MPC · JPL
232737	2004 FS_{30}	—	March 28, 2004	Socorro	LINEAR	·	1.1 km	MPC · JPL
232738	2004 FJ_{34}	—	March 16, 2004	Catalina	CSS	·	5.4 km	MPC · JPL
232739	2004 FM_{62}	—	March 19, 2004	Socorro	LINEAR	·	4.0 km	MPC · JPL
232740	2004 FW_{84}	—	March 18, 2004	Socorro	LINEAR	·	2.4 km	MPC · JPL
232741	2004 FP_{94}	—	March 18, 2004	Catalina	CSS	EOS	4.0 km	MPC · JPL
232742	2004 FP_{101}	—	March 23, 2004	Socorro	LINEAR	·	2.6 km	MPC · JPL
232743	2004 FO_{120}	—	March 23, 2004	Socorro	LINEAR	·	1.1 km	MPC · JPL
232744	2004 GK_{24}	—	April 13, 2004	Kitt Peak	Spacewatch	PHO	3.2 km	MPC · JPL
232745	2004 HL_{18}	—	April 17, 2004	Socorro	LINEAR	CYB	5.4 km	MPC · JPL
232746	2004 HH_{63}	—	April 16, 2004	Catalina	CSS	H	820 m	MPC · JPL
232747	2004 JK_{11}	—	May 13, 2004	Anderson Mesa	LONEOS	·	5.7 km	MPC · JPL
232748	2004 JX_{19}	—	May 14, 2004	Anderson Mesa	LONEOS	·	3.1 km	MPC · JPL
232749	2004 JY_{20}	—	May 9, 2004	Kitt Peak	Spacewatch	THM	3.6 km	MPC · JPL
232750	2004 JU_{37}	—	May 14, 2004	Socorro	LINEAR	·	1.1 km	MPC · JPL
232751	2004 KJ	—	May 16, 2004	Socorro	LINEAR	·	6.0 km	MPC · JPL
232752	2004 KF_{8}	—	May 16, 2004	Socorro	LINEAR	·	3.7 km	MPC · JPL
232753	2004 LE_{16}	—	June 12, 2004	Socorro	LINEAR	·	2.5 km	MPC · JPL
232754	2004 NN_{2}	—	July 10, 2004	Palomar	NEAT	·	1.5 km	MPC · JPL
232755	2004 NM_{3}	—	July 12, 2004	Reedy Creek	J. Broughton	·	770 m	MPC · JPL
232756	2004 NS_{6}	—	July 11, 2004	Socorro	LINEAR	·	2.2 km	MPC · JPL
232757	2004 NJ_{7}	—	July 13, 2004	Palomar	NEAT	·	1.2 km	MPC · JPL
232758	2004 OS_{11}	—	July 25, 2004	Needville	J. Dellinger	·	2.0 km	MPC · JPL
232759	2004 PM_{3}	—	August 3, 2004	Siding Spring	SSS	·	1.1 km	MPC · JPL
232760	2004 PY_{8}	—	August 6, 2004	Palomar	NEAT	·	1.9 km	MPC · JPL
232761	2004 PQ_{23}	—	August 8, 2004	Socorro	LINEAR	·	960 m	MPC · JPL
232762	2004 PV_{24}	—	August 8, 2004	Socorro	LINEAR	·	2.1 km	MPC · JPL
232763 Eliewiesel	2004 PC_{27}	Eliewiesel	August 10, 2004	Francisquito	Jones, R. E.	·	1.5 km	MPC · JPL
232764	2004 PN_{28}	—	August 6, 2004	Palomar	NEAT	PHO	1.0 km	MPC · JPL
232765	2004 PT_{31}	—	August 8, 2004	Socorro	LINEAR	·	2.1 km	MPC · JPL
232766	2004 PR_{35}	—	August 8, 2004	Anderson Mesa	LONEOS	·	2.1 km	MPC · JPL
232767	2004 PQ_{39}	—	August 9, 2004	Socorro	LINEAR	fast	2.2 km	MPC · JPL
232768	2004 PY_{40}	—	August 9, 2004	Socorro	LINEAR	·	2.1 km	MPC · JPL
232769	2004 PJ_{51}	—	August 8, 2004	Socorro	LINEAR	·	1.4 km	MPC · JPL
232770	2004 PD_{53}	—	August 8, 2004	Socorro	LINEAR	NYS	1.3 km	MPC · JPL
232771	2004 PV_{56}	—	August 9, 2004	Socorro	LINEAR	·	1.7 km	MPC · JPL
232772	2004 PG_{61}	—	August 9, 2004	Socorro	LINEAR	·	2.6 km	MPC · JPL
232773	2004 PC_{72}	—	August 8, 2004	Socorro	LINEAR	MAS	1.0 km	MPC · JPL
232774	2004 PF_{73}	—	August 8, 2004	Socorro	LINEAR	·	2.3 km	MPC · JPL
232775	2004 PA_{75}	—	August 8, 2004	Anderson Mesa	LONEOS	·	1.4 km	MPC · JPL
232776	2004 PU_{75}	—	August 8, 2004	Campo Imperatore	CINEOS	·	1.9 km	MPC · JPL
232777	2004 PN_{76}	—	August 9, 2004	Anderson Mesa	LONEOS	·	2.0 km	MPC · JPL
232778	2004 PH_{80}	—	August 9, 2004	Socorro	LINEAR	·	3.3 km	MPC · JPL
232779	2004 PM_{85}	—	August 10, 2004	Socorro	LINEAR	NYS	1.4 km	MPC · JPL
232780	2004 PD_{98}	—	August 15, 2004	Reedy Creek	J. Broughton	·	3.0 km	MPC · JPL
232781	2004 PX_{108}	—	August 10, 2004	Anderson Mesa	LONEOS	·	1.5 km	MPC · JPL
232782	2004 PT_{111}	—	August 10, 2004	Socorro	LINEAR	·	2.2 km	MPC · JPL
232783	2004 QF_{3}	—	August 20, 2004	Reedy Creek	J. Broughton	·	2.0 km	MPC · JPL
232784	2004 QT_{6}	—	August 20, 2004	Goodricke-Pigott	R. A. Tucker	NYS	1.5 km	MPC · JPL
232785	2004 QB_{10}	—	August 21, 2004	Siding Spring	SSS	MAR	1.6 km	MPC · JPL
232786	2004 QT_{13}	—	August 17, 2004	Črni Vrh	Mikuž, H.	PHO	2.4 km	MPC · JPL
232787	2004 RM_{15}	—	September 7, 2004	Socorro	LINEAR	MAS	840 m	MPC · JPL
232788	2004 RF_{19}	—	September 7, 2004	Socorro	LINEAR	·	4.5 km	MPC · JPL
232789	2004 RN_{32}	—	September 7, 2004	Socorro	LINEAR	(5)	1.3 km	MPC · JPL
232790	2004 RO_{69}	—	September 8, 2004	Socorro	LINEAR	·	1.8 km	MPC · JPL
232791	2004 RG_{75}	—	September 8, 2004	Socorro	LINEAR	·	2.5 km	MPC · JPL
232792	2004 RX_{78}	—	September 8, 2004	Palomar	NEAT	·	1.5 km	MPC · JPL
232793	2004 RN_{95}	—	September 8, 2004	Socorro	LINEAR	·	1.1 km	MPC · JPL
232794	2004 RW_{100}	—	September 8, 2004	Socorro	LINEAR	·	2.4 km	MPC · JPL
232795	2004 RY_{101}	—	September 8, 2004	Socorro	LINEAR	·	1.9 km	MPC · JPL
232796	2004 RB_{112}	—	September 5, 2004	Siding Spring	SSS	·	2.0 km	MPC · JPL
232797	2004 RY_{180}	—	September 10, 2004	Socorro	LINEAR	EUN	1.3 km	MPC · JPL
232798	2004 RT_{191}	—	September 10, 2004	Socorro	LINEAR	·	1.9 km	MPC · JPL
232799	2004 RS_{193}	—	September 10, 2004	Socorro	LINEAR	·	2.0 km	MPC · JPL
232800	2004 RH_{196}	—	September 10, 2004	Socorro	LINEAR	·	1.8 km	MPC · JPL

== 232801–232900 ==
back to top

Designation			Discovery			Properties		Ref
Permanent	Provisional	Named after	Date	Site	Discoverer(s)	Category	Diam.	Ref
232801	2004 RY_{198}	—	September 10, 2004	Socorro	LINEAR	·	2.3 km	MPC · JPL
232802	2004 RV_{199}	—	September 10, 2004	Socorro	LINEAR	·	3.0 km	MPC · JPL
232803	2004 RX_{216}	—	September 11, 2004	Socorro	LINEAR	·	2.0 km	MPC · JPL
232804	2004 RA_{220}	—	September 11, 2004	Socorro	LINEAR	JUN	1.1 km	MPC · JPL
232805	2004 RF_{220}	—	September 11, 2004	Socorro	LINEAR	·	2.9 km	MPC · JPL
232806	2004 RM_{231}	—	September 9, 2004	Kitt Peak	Spacewatch	·	1.7 km	MPC · JPL
232807	2004 RO_{231}	—	September 9, 2004	Kitt Peak	Spacewatch	·	1.9 km	MPC · JPL
232808	2004 RN_{249}	—	September 12, 2004	Kitt Peak	Spacewatch	(5)	1.5 km	MPC · JPL
232809	2004 RD_{257}	—	September 9, 2004	Anderson Mesa	LONEOS	·	3.2 km	MPC · JPL
232810	2004 RM_{270}	—	September 11, 2004	Kitt Peak	Spacewatch	·	2.5 km	MPC · JPL
232811	2004 RY_{273}	—	September 11, 2004	Kitt Peak	Spacewatch	NYS	1.6 km	MPC · JPL
232812	2004 RG_{298}	—	September 11, 2004	Kitt Peak	Spacewatch	·	1.5 km	MPC · JPL
232813	2004 RP_{305}	—	September 12, 2004	Socorro	LINEAR	·	1.4 km	MPC · JPL
232814	2004 RZ_{310}	—	September 13, 2004	Palomar	NEAT	(5)	1.4 km	MPC · JPL
232815	2004 RH_{312}	—	September 15, 2004	Anderson Mesa	LONEOS	·	2.8 km	MPC · JPL
232816	2004 RW_{313}	—	September 15, 2004	Kitt Peak	Spacewatch	·	3.2 km	MPC · JPL
232817	2004 RA_{322}	—	September 13, 2004	Socorro	LINEAR	·	2.0 km	MPC · JPL
232818	2004 RP_{325}	—	September 13, 2004	Socorro	LINEAR	EUN	5.1 km	MPC · JPL
232819	2004 RF_{326}	—	September 13, 2004	Socorro	LINEAR	·	4.1 km	MPC · JPL
232820	2004 RG_{336}	—	September 15, 2004	Kitt Peak	Spacewatch	·	1.4 km	MPC · JPL
232821	2004 RY_{340}	—	September 7, 2004	Socorro	LINEAR	·	3.3 km	MPC · JPL
232822	2004 RU_{345}	—	September 8, 2004	Socorro	LINEAR	·	940 m	MPC · JPL
232823	2004 ST_{22}	—	September 17, 2004	Kitt Peak	Spacewatch	JUN	1.2 km	MPC · JPL
232824	2004 SQ_{25}	—	September 22, 2004	Desert Eagle	W. K. Y. Yeung	(5)	1.5 km	MPC · JPL
232825	2004 SE_{40}	—	September 17, 2004	Socorro	LINEAR	·	3.2 km	MPC · JPL
232826	2004 SD_{50}	—	September 22, 2004	Socorro	LINEAR	PAD	4.4 km	MPC · JPL
232827	2004 SX_{51}	—	September 17, 2004	Socorro	LINEAR	·	4.4 km	MPC · JPL
232828	2004 SR_{60}	—	September 18, 2004	Socorro	LINEAR	·	4.3 km	MPC · JPL
232829	2004 SS_{60}	—	September 18, 2004	Socorro	LINEAR	615	2.1 km	MPC · JPL
232830	2004 TG	—	October 3, 2004	Goodricke-Pigott	R. A. Tucker	NYS	1.3 km	MPC · JPL
232831	2004 TY_{2}	—	October 4, 2004	Kitt Peak	Spacewatch	·	1.9 km	MPC · JPL
232832	2004 TC_{7}	—	October 5, 2004	Socorro	LINEAR	·	2.4 km	MPC · JPL
232833	2004 TA_{21}	—	October 11, 2004	Kitt Peak	Spacewatch	·	1.3 km	MPC · JPL
232834	2004 TC_{29}	—	October 4, 2004	Kitt Peak	Spacewatch	MAS	1.0 km	MPC · JPL
232835	2004 TQ_{30}	—	October 4, 2004	Kitt Peak	Spacewatch	·	1.2 km	MPC · JPL
232836	2004 TF_{47}	—	October 4, 2004	Kitt Peak	Spacewatch	(29841)	1.7 km	MPC · JPL
232837	2004 TZ_{50}	—	October 4, 2004	Kitt Peak	Spacewatch	(5)	2.6 km	MPC · JPL
232838	2004 TE_{52}	—	October 4, 2004	Kitt Peak	Spacewatch	·	1.4 km	MPC · JPL
232839	2004 TV_{61}	—	October 5, 2004	Anderson Mesa	LONEOS	·	1.9 km	MPC · JPL
232840	2004 TE_{65}	—	October 5, 2004	Palomar	NEAT	·	1.4 km	MPC · JPL
232841	2004 TL_{66}	—	October 5, 2004	Anderson Mesa	LONEOS	(5)	3.4 km	MPC · JPL
232842	2004 TB_{70}	—	October 5, 2004	Palomar	NEAT	·	2.0 km	MPC · JPL
232843	2004 TK_{76}	—	October 7, 2004	Socorro	LINEAR	·	3.6 km	MPC · JPL
232844	2004 TT_{80}	—	October 5, 2004	Kitt Peak	Spacewatch	·	1.5 km	MPC · JPL
232845	2004 TH_{135}	—	October 8, 2004	Anderson Mesa	LONEOS	(13314)	3.3 km	MPC · JPL
232846	2004 TS_{137}	—	October 8, 2004	Anderson Mesa	LONEOS	·	1.6 km	MPC · JPL
232847	2004 TO_{142}	—	October 4, 2004	Kitt Peak	Spacewatch	·	1.8 km	MPC · JPL
232848	2004 TD_{157}	—	October 6, 2004	Kitt Peak	Spacewatch	MAS	950 m	MPC · JPL
232849	2004 TK_{161}	—	October 6, 2004	Kitt Peak	Spacewatch	·	2.8 km	MPC · JPL
232850	2004 TP_{161}	—	October 6, 2004	Kitt Peak	Spacewatch	·	1.9 km	MPC · JPL
232851	2004 TP_{165}	—	October 7, 2004	Kitt Peak	Spacewatch	·	3.0 km	MPC · JPL
232852	2004 TV_{167}	—	October 7, 2004	Kitt Peak	Spacewatch	NYS	1.6 km	MPC · JPL
232853	2004 TQ_{170}	—	October 7, 2004	Socorro	LINEAR	·	5.8 km	MPC · JPL
232854	2004 TZ_{180}	—	October 7, 2004	Kitt Peak	Spacewatch	·	2.1 km	MPC · JPL
232855	2004 TL_{201}	—	October 7, 2004	Kitt Peak	Spacewatch	·	2.1 km	MPC · JPL
232856	2004 TD_{208}	—	October 7, 2004	Kitt Peak	Spacewatch	·	1.4 km	MPC · JPL
232857	2004 TQ_{217}	—	October 5, 2004	Kitt Peak	Spacewatch	·	3.4 km	MPC · JPL
232858	2004 TC_{223}	—	October 7, 2004	Socorro	LINEAR	·	2.9 km	MPC · JPL
232859	2004 TO_{243}	—	October 6, 2004	Kitt Peak	Spacewatch	·	1.7 km	MPC · JPL
232860	2004 TW_{263}	—	October 9, 2004	Kitt Peak	Spacewatch	·	1.8 km	MPC · JPL
232861	2004 TE_{273}	—	October 9, 2004	Kitt Peak	Spacewatch	·	2.2 km	MPC · JPL
232862	2004 TV_{274}	—	October 9, 2004	Kitt Peak	Spacewatch	·	2.2 km	MPC · JPL
232863	2004 TC_{281}	—	October 10, 2004	Kitt Peak	Spacewatch	(29841)	1.7 km	MPC · JPL
232864	2004 TQ_{283}	—	October 8, 2004	Kitt Peak	Spacewatch	·	1.5 km	MPC · JPL
232865	2004 TG_{295}	—	October 10, 2004	Kitt Peak	Spacewatch	·	2.0 km	MPC · JPL
232866	2004 TZ_{295}	—	October 10, 2004	Kitt Peak	Spacewatch	MRX	1.2 km	MPC · JPL
232867	2004 TA_{344}	—	October 15, 2004	Kitt Peak	Spacewatch	(5)	1.6 km	MPC · JPL
232868 Salmasylla	2004 TS_{354}	Salmasylla	October 11, 2004	Kitt Peak	M. W. Buie	·	1.9 km	MPC · JPL
232869	2004 TN_{359}	—	October 9, 2004	Kitt Peak	Spacewatch	·	1.2 km	MPC · JPL
232870	2004 UQ_{3}	—	October 19, 2004	Socorro	LINEAR	H · slow	1.2 km	MPC · JPL
232871	2004 VM_{6}	—	November 3, 2004	Kitt Peak	Spacewatch	·	2.1 km	MPC · JPL
232872	2004 VN_{22}	—	November 4, 2004	Catalina	CSS	·	1.7 km	MPC · JPL
232873	2004 VY_{23}	—	November 2, 2004	Palomar	NEAT	·	2.3 km	MPC · JPL
232874	2004 VP_{28}	—	November 7, 2004	Socorro	LINEAR	·	3.4 km	MPC · JPL
232875	2004 VO_{29}	—	November 3, 2004	Kitt Peak	Spacewatch	·	1.9 km	MPC · JPL
232876	2004 VC_{37}	—	November 4, 2004	Kitt Peak	Spacewatch	·	1.6 km	MPC · JPL
232877	2004 VJ_{38}	—	November 4, 2004	Kitt Peak	Spacewatch	·	2.7 km	MPC · JPL
232878	2004 VW_{40}	—	November 4, 2004	Kitt Peak	Spacewatch	HNS	2.6 km	MPC · JPL
232879	2004 VX_{56}	—	November 4, 2004	Catalina	CSS	·	3.0 km	MPC · JPL
232880	2004 VO_{58}	—	November 9, 2004	Catalina	CSS	·	3.2 km	MPC · JPL
232881	2004 VO_{59}	—	November 9, 2004	Catalina	CSS	·	2.0 km	MPC · JPL
232882	2004 VR_{76}	—	November 12, 2004	Catalina	CSS	AGN	2.0 km	MPC · JPL
232883	2004 VT_{77}	—	November 12, 2004	Catalina	CSS	(5)	1.9 km	MPC · JPL
232884	2004 VU_{86}	—	November 11, 2004	Kitt Peak	Spacewatch	·	2.1 km	MPC · JPL
232885	2004 XT_{3}	—	December 4, 2004	Eskridge	G. Hug	·	2.8 km	MPC · JPL
232886	2004 XD_{8}	—	December 2, 2004	Palomar	NEAT	·	1.8 km	MPC · JPL
232887	2004 XE_{9}	—	December 2, 2004	Catalina	CSS	·	2.8 km	MPC · JPL
232888	2004 XG_{17}	—	December 3, 2004	Kitt Peak	Spacewatch	·	3.6 km	MPC · JPL
232889	2004 XQ_{18}	—	December 8, 2004	Socorro	LINEAR	·	5.5 km	MPC · JPL
232890	2004 XC_{23}	—	December 8, 2004	Socorro	LINEAR	·	3.4 km	MPC · JPL
232891	2004 XH_{25}	—	December 9, 2004	Catalina	CSS	KON	4.6 km	MPC · JPL
232892	2004 XR_{29}	—	December 10, 2004	Socorro	LINEAR	·	1.7 km	MPC · JPL
232893	2004 XB_{31}	—	December 8, 2004	Socorro	LINEAR	·	5.2 km	MPC · JPL
232894	2004 XJ_{32}	—	December 10, 2004	Socorro	LINEAR	·	2.1 km	MPC · JPL
232895	2004 XV_{35}	—	December 8, 2004	Socorro	LINEAR	·	4.6 km	MPC · JPL
232896	2004 XC_{36}	—	December 10, 2004	Kitt Peak	Spacewatch	·	2.1 km	MPC · JPL
232897	2004 XT_{39}	—	December 8, 2004	Socorro	LINEAR	·	2.0 km	MPC · JPL
232898	2004 XM_{41}	—	December 11, 2004	Campo Imperatore	CINEOS	·	5.9 km	MPC · JPL
232899	2004 XG_{49}	—	December 11, 2004	Kitt Peak	Spacewatch	·	2.7 km	MPC · JPL
232900	2004 XG_{51}	—	December 14, 2004	Junk Bond	Junk Bond	·	2.6 km	MPC · JPL

== 232901–233000 ==
back to top

Designation			Discovery			Properties		Ref
Permanent	Provisional	Named after	Date	Site	Discoverer(s)	Category	Diam.	Ref
232901	2004 XX_{81}	—	December 10, 2004	Anderson Mesa	LONEOS	·	3.0 km	MPC · JPL
232902	2004 XX_{84}	—	December 12, 2004	Vail-Jarnac	Jarnac	DOR	3.5 km	MPC · JPL
232903	2004 XO_{87}	—	December 9, 2004	Catalina	CSS	·	1.7 km	MPC · JPL
232904	2004 XL_{92}	—	December 11, 2004	Socorro	LINEAR	·	6.2 km	MPC · JPL
232905	2004 XS_{101}	—	December 14, 2004	Catalina	CSS	·	1.9 km	MPC · JPL
232906	2004 XG_{121}	—	December 14, 2004	Socorro	LINEAR	·	3.0 km	MPC · JPL
232907	2004 XQ_{129}	—	December 15, 2004	Kitt Peak	Spacewatch	·	4.5 km	MPC · JPL
232908	2004 XE_{136}	—	December 15, 2004	Socorro	LINEAR	·	2.1 km	MPC · JPL
232909	2004 XM_{136}	—	December 15, 2004	Socorro	LINEAR	·	1.9 km	MPC · JPL
232910	2004 XH_{137}	—	December 15, 2004	Socorro	LINEAR	·	3.1 km	MPC · JPL
232911	2004 XK_{147}	—	December 1, 2004	Catalina	CSS	GEF	2.2 km	MPC · JPL
232912	2004 YR_{3}	—	December 16, 2004	Vail-Jarnac	Jarnac	AST	3.0 km	MPC · JPL
232913	2004 YJ_{4}	—	December 16, 2004	Catalina	CSS	·	3.8 km	MPC · JPL
232914	2004 YG_{15}	—	December 18, 2004	Mount Lemmon	Mount Lemmon Survey	HOF	4.7 km	MPC · JPL
232915	2004 YN_{23}	—	December 18, 2004	Mount Lemmon	Mount Lemmon Survey	·	2.2 km	MPC · JPL
232916	2004 YV_{25}	—	December 19, 2004	Mount Lemmon	Mount Lemmon Survey	VER	4.0 km	MPC · JPL
232917	2004 YF_{32}	—	December 21, 2004	Catalina	CSS	·	4.6 km	MPC · JPL
232918	2005 AN_{7}	—	January 6, 2005	Catalina	CSS	·	6.0 km	MPC · JPL
232919	2005 AQ_{10}	—	January 6, 2005	Catalina	CSS	EUN	1.9 km	MPC · JPL
232920	2005 AQ_{16}	—	January 6, 2005	Socorro	LINEAR	·	4.2 km	MPC · JPL
232921	2005 AH_{21}	—	January 6, 2005	Catalina	CSS	·	3.0 km	MPC · JPL
232922	2005 AP_{26}	—	January 13, 2005	Kitt Peak	Spacewatch	·	3.6 km	MPC · JPL
232923 Adalovelace	2005 AA_{29}	Adalovelace	January 15, 2005	Kleť	KLENOT	·	2.0 km	MPC · JPL
232924	2005 AB_{30}	—	January 9, 2005	Catalina	CSS	·	3.8 km	MPC · JPL
232925	2005 AL_{30}	—	January 9, 2005	Catalina	CSS	·	2.6 km	MPC · JPL
232926	2005 AN_{34}	—	January 13, 2005	Kitt Peak	Spacewatch	(1298)	5.1 km	MPC · JPL
232927	2005 AO_{36}	—	January 13, 2005	Socorro	LINEAR	WAT	2.9 km	MPC · JPL
232928	2005 AO_{41}	—	January 15, 2005	Socorro	LINEAR	·	2.6 km	MPC · JPL
232929	2005 AB_{49}	—	January 13, 2005	Kitt Peak	Spacewatch	·	2.4 km	MPC · JPL
232930	2005 AM_{49}	—	January 13, 2005	Socorro	LINEAR	·	5.8 km	MPC · JPL
232931	2005 AF_{51}	—	January 13, 2005	Catalina	CSS	·	5.7 km	MPC · JPL
232932	2005 AY_{51}	—	January 13, 2005	Kitt Peak	Spacewatch	·	4.2 km	MPC · JPL
232933	2005 AM_{72}	—	January 15, 2005	Kitt Peak	Spacewatch	KOR	1.8 km	MPC · JPL
232934	2005 AM_{81}	—	January 15, 2005	Socorro	LINEAR	·	4.9 km	MPC · JPL
232935	2005 AX_{82}	—	January 13, 2005	Kitt Peak	Spacewatch	BRA	1.7 km	MPC · JPL
232936	2005 BX_{2}	—	January 19, 2005	Wrightwood	J. W. Young	VER	3.9 km	MPC · JPL
232937	2005 BM_{13}	—	January 17, 2005	Kitt Peak	Spacewatch	HYG	4.6 km	MPC · JPL
232938	2005 BL_{28}	—	January 31, 2005	Mayhill	Lowe, A.	·	4.3 km	MPC · JPL
232939	2005 BB_{31}	—	January 16, 2005	Mauna Kea	Veillet, C.	·	2.5 km	MPC · JPL
232940	2005 BD_{36}	—	January 16, 2005	Mauna Kea	Veillet, C.	AGN	1.6 km	MPC · JPL
232941	2005 CD_{11}	—	February 1, 2005	Kitt Peak	Spacewatch	NAE	4.0 km	MPC · JPL
232942	2005 CV_{18}	—	February 2, 2005	Catalina	CSS	·	2.1 km	MPC · JPL
232943	2005 CD_{31}	—	February 1, 2005	Kitt Peak	Spacewatch	KOR	1.8 km	MPC · JPL
232944	2005 CL_{34}	—	February 2, 2005	Kitt Peak	Spacewatch	CYB	7.0 km	MPC · JPL
232945	2005 CD_{45}	—	February 2, 2005	Kitt Peak	Spacewatch	KOR	1.8 km	MPC · JPL
232946	2005 CQ_{51}	—	February 2, 2005	Catalina	CSS	·	2.8 km	MPC · JPL
232947	2005 EP_{5}	—	March 1, 2005	Kitt Peak	Spacewatch	THM	3.6 km	MPC · JPL
232948	2005 EX_{6}	—	March 1, 2005	Kitt Peak	Spacewatch	EOS	2.9 km	MPC · JPL
232949 Muhina	2005 EN_{8}	Muhina	March 1, 2005	Marly	Observatoire Naef	·	3.0 km	MPC · JPL
232950	2005 EU_{9}	—	March 2, 2005	Kitt Peak	Spacewatch	·	3.6 km	MPC · JPL
232951	2005 EF_{10}	—	March 2, 2005	Kitt Peak	Spacewatch	TIR	4.2 km	MPC · JPL
232952	2005 EC_{17}	—	March 3, 2005	Kitt Peak	Spacewatch	·	4.1 km	MPC · JPL
232953	2005 EO_{18}	—	March 3, 2005	Kitt Peak	Spacewatch	THM	3.0 km	MPC · JPL
232954	2005 EM_{19}	—	March 3, 2005	Kitt Peak	Spacewatch	THM	2.6 km	MPC · JPL
232955	2005 ER_{19}	—	March 3, 2005	Kitt Peak	Spacewatch	·	3.8 km	MPC · JPL
232956	2005 ED_{21}	—	March 3, 2005	Catalina	CSS	(21885)	5.6 km	MPC · JPL
232957	2005 EU_{24}	—	March 3, 2005	Catalina	CSS	·	3.2 km	MPC · JPL
232958	2005 EG_{25}	—	March 3, 2005	Catalina	CSS	·	4.2 km	MPC · JPL
232959	2005 EJ_{27}	—	March 3, 2005	Catalina	CSS	·	4.0 km	MPC · JPL
232960	2005 ES_{35}	—	March 4, 2005	Catalina	CSS	·	5.3 km	MPC · JPL
232961	2005 EZ_{36}	—	March 4, 2005	Socorro	LINEAR	·	5.4 km	MPC · JPL
232962	2005 ES_{38}	—	March 4, 2005	Kleť	Kleť	H	880 m	MPC · JPL
232963	2005 EV_{48}	—	March 3, 2005	Catalina	CSS	·	3.2 km	MPC · JPL
232964	2005 EA_{50}	—	March 3, 2005	Catalina	CSS	·	3.7 km	MPC · JPL
232965	2005 EF_{66}	—	March 4, 2005	Catalina	CSS	·	2.3 km	MPC · JPL
232966	2005 EG_{67}	—	March 4, 2005	Mount Lemmon	Mount Lemmon Survey	·	4.8 km	MPC · JPL
232967	2005 EY_{70}	—	March 4, 2005	Junk Bond	Junk Bond	·	2.2 km	MPC · JPL
232968	2005 EG_{76}	—	March 3, 2005	Kitt Peak	Spacewatch	·	1.2 km	MPC · JPL
232969	2005 EX_{83}	—	March 4, 2005	Catalina	CSS	TIR ·	5.0 km	MPC · JPL
232970	2005 EB_{84}	—	March 4, 2005	Catalina	CSS	EOS	2.9 km	MPC · JPL
232971	2005 ET_{86}	—	March 4, 2005	Catalina	CSS	EUP	7.0 km	MPC · JPL
232972	2005 EZ_{91}	—	March 8, 2005	Anderson Mesa	LONEOS	·	3.1 km	MPC · JPL
232973	2005 EK_{92}	—	March 8, 2005	Anderson Mesa	LONEOS	·	4.0 km	MPC · JPL
232974	2005 EC_{99}	—	March 3, 2005	Catalina	CSS	EOS	2.8 km	MPC · JPL
232975	2005 ER_{101}	—	March 3, 2005	Catalina	CSS	VER	5.4 km	MPC · JPL
232976	2005 ET_{102}	—	March 4, 2005	Kitt Peak	Spacewatch	·	2.7 km	MPC · JPL
232977	2005 EF_{104}	—	March 4, 2005	Kitt Peak	Spacewatch	·	4.1 km	MPC · JPL
232978	2005 EF_{118}	—	March 7, 2005	Socorro	LINEAR	·	2.9 km	MPC · JPL
232979	2005 EG_{124}	—	March 8, 2005	Anderson Mesa	LONEOS	·	2.7 km	MPC · JPL
232980	2005 EO_{124}	—	March 8, 2005	Anderson Mesa	LONEOS	·	3.2 km	MPC · JPL
232981	2005 EP_{126}	—	March 8, 2005	Mount Lemmon	Mount Lemmon Survey	·	2.9 km	MPC · JPL
232982	2005 ER_{131}	—	March 9, 2005	Socorro	LINEAR	EOS	2.7 km	MPC · JPL
232983	2005 EM_{132}	—	March 9, 2005	Anderson Mesa	LONEOS	·	2.9 km	MPC · JPL
232984	2005 ET_{132}	—	March 9, 2005	Kitt Peak	Spacewatch	·	3.8 km	MPC · JPL
232985	2005 ES_{134}	—	March 9, 2005	Mount Lemmon	Mount Lemmon Survey	·	4.9 km	MPC · JPL
232986	2005 EF_{136}	—	March 9, 2005	Anderson Mesa	LONEOS	·	5.2 km	MPC · JPL
232987	2005 EJ_{138}	—	March 9, 2005	Socorro	LINEAR	·	5.7 km	MPC · JPL
232988	2005 EY_{142}	—	March 10, 2005	Catalina	CSS	·	3.7 km	MPC · JPL
232989	2005 EP_{143}	—	March 10, 2005	Mount Lemmon	Mount Lemmon Survey	HYG	3.4 km	MPC · JPL
232990	2005 EG_{146}	—	March 10, 2005	Mount Lemmon	Mount Lemmon Survey	THM	3.1 km	MPC · JPL
232991	2005 ES_{147}	—	March 10, 2005	Kitt Peak	Spacewatch	THM	3.1 km	MPC · JPL
232992	2005 EW_{155}	—	March 8, 2005	Mount Lemmon	Mount Lemmon Survey	EOS	2.9 km	MPC · JPL
232993	2005 EM_{158}	—	March 9, 2005	Mount Lemmon	Mount Lemmon Survey	·	3.0 km	MPC · JPL
232994	2005 ES_{160}	—	March 9, 2005	Mount Lemmon	Mount Lemmon Survey	·	2.6 km	MPC · JPL
232995	2005 EC_{162}	—	March 9, 2005	Mount Lemmon	Mount Lemmon Survey	TEL	2.0 km	MPC · JPL
232996	2005 EW_{162}	—	March 10, 2005	Mount Lemmon	Mount Lemmon Survey	·	3.3 km	MPC · JPL
232997	2005 ER_{174}	—	March 8, 2005	Kitt Peak	Spacewatch	·	2.4 km	MPC · JPL
232998	2005 EO_{177}	—	March 8, 2005	Mount Lemmon	Mount Lemmon Survey	·	2.7 km	MPC · JPL
232999	2005 EC_{180}	—	March 9, 2005	Kitt Peak	Spacewatch	·	3.1 km	MPC · JPL
233000	2005 EX_{181}	—	March 9, 2005	Socorro	LINEAR	·	3.1 km	MPC · JPL

back to top

== See also ==
- Meanings of minor-planet names: 232001–233000
